= Hydrangea coenobialis =

Scientific classification
- Kingdom: Plantae
- Clade: Tracheophytes
- Clade: Angiosperms
- Clade: Eudicots
- Clade: Asterids
- Order: Cornales
- Family: Hydrangeaceae
- Genus: Hydrangea
- Species: H. coenobialis

Binomial name
- Hydrangea coenobialis Chun

Synonyms
- Hydrangea candida Chun

Species of flowering plant

Hydrangea coenobialis is a species of flowering plant in the family Hydrangeaceae, native to southeast China.
