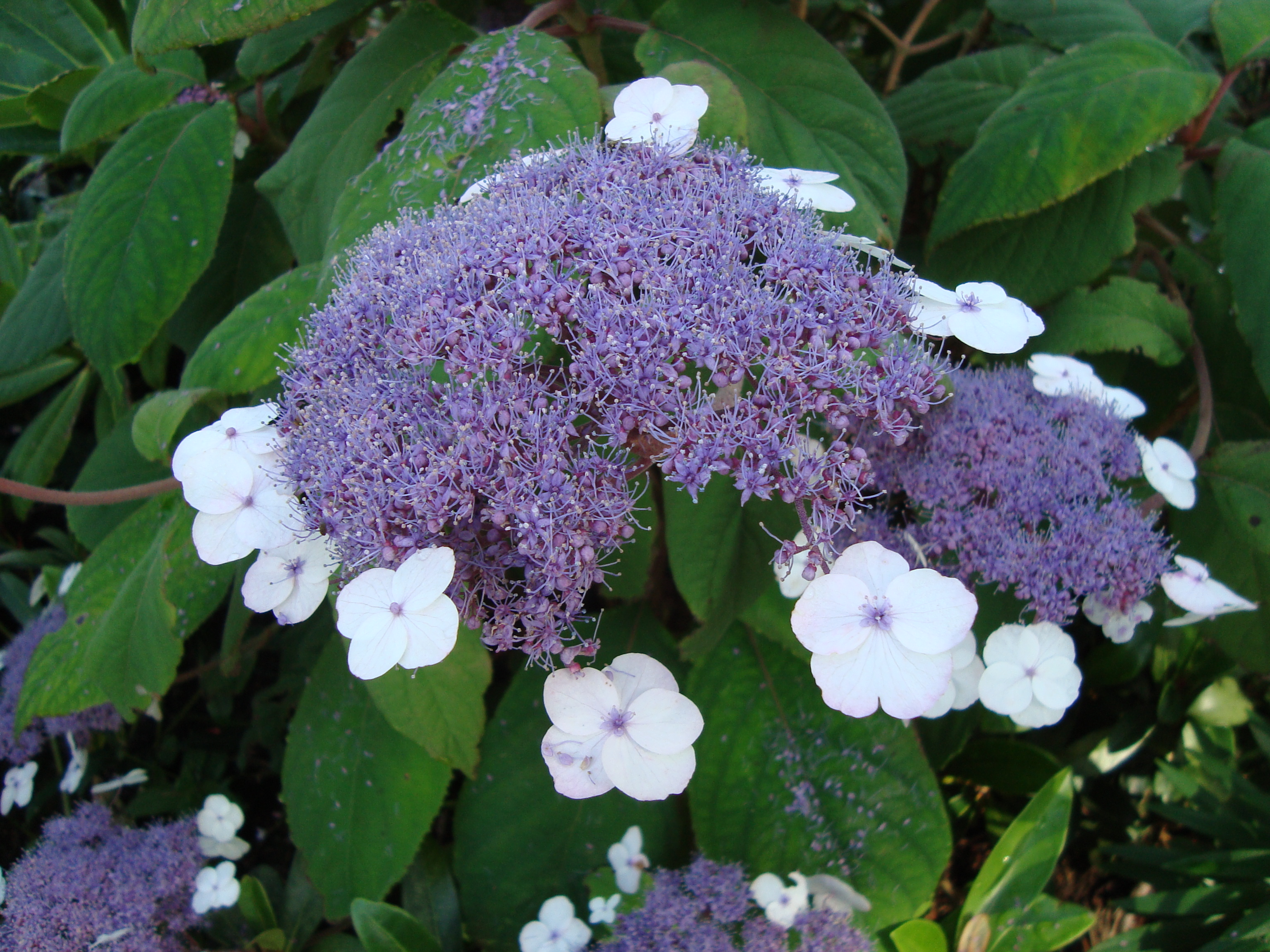

Scientific classification
- Kingdom: Plantae
- Clade: Tracheophytes
- Clade: Angiosperms
- Clade: Eudicots
- Clade: Asterids
- Order: Cornales
- Family: Hydrangeaceae
- Genus: Hydrangea
- Species: H. strigosa

Binomial name
- Hydrangea strigosa Rehder

= Hydrangea strigosa =

Species of flowering plant

Hydrangea strigosa is a species of flowering plant in the family Hydrangeaceae. It is native to China.
