= Hydrangea tarapotensis =

Scientific classification
- Kingdom: Plantae
- Clade: Tracheophytes
- Clade: Angiosperms
- Clade: Eudicots
- Clade: Asterids
- Order: Cornales
- Family: Hydrangeaceae
- Genus: Hydrangea
- Species: H. tarapotensis

Binomial name
- Hydrangea tarapotensis Briq.

Synonyms
- Hydrangea antioquesis Engl.; Hydrangea bangii Engl.

Species of flowering plant

Hydrangea tarapotensis is a shrub or woody climber in the flowering plant family Hydrangeaceae. It is native to South America.
