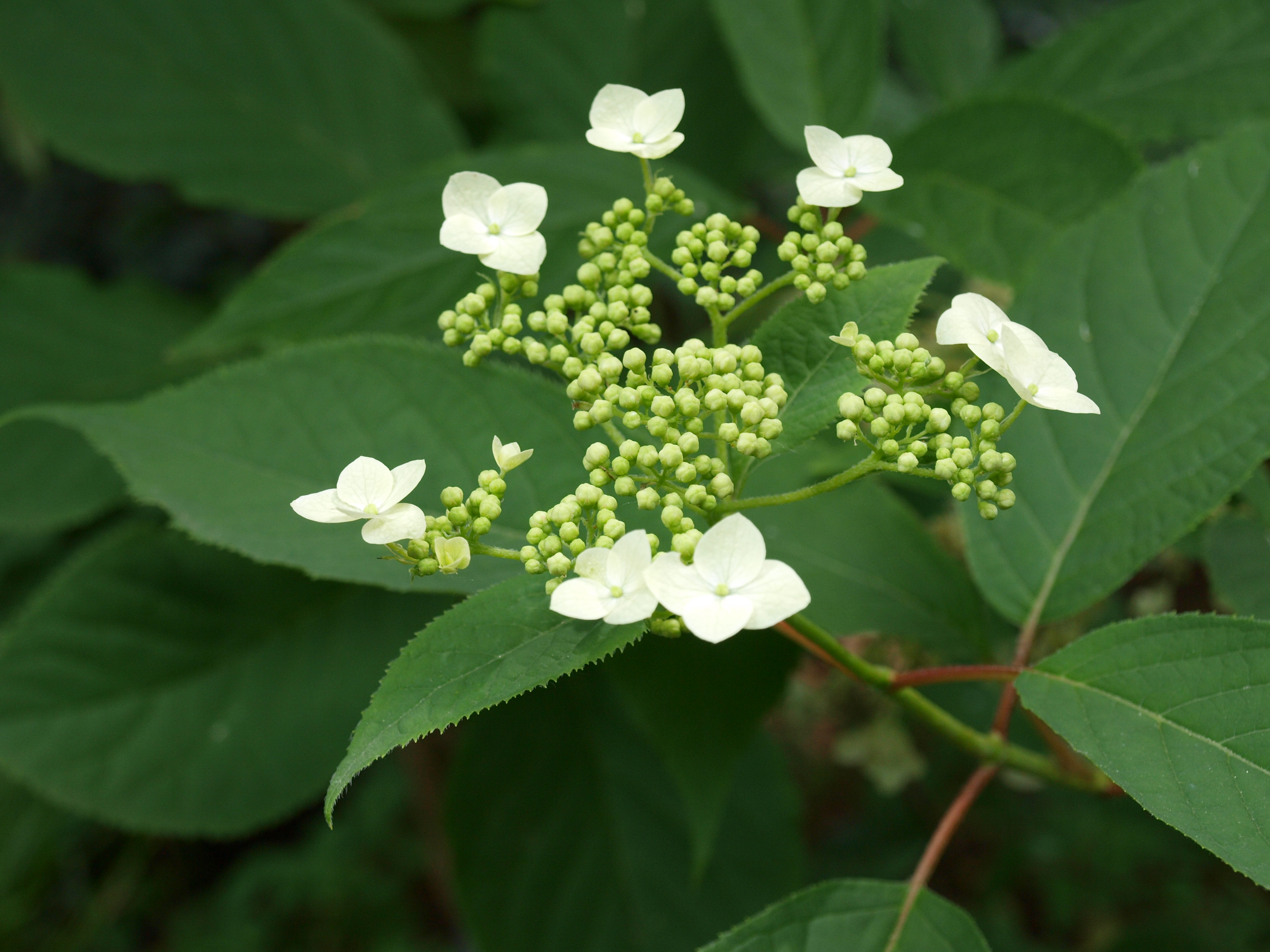

Scientific classification
- Kingdom: Plantae
- Clade: Tracheophytes
- Clade: Angiosperms
- Clade: Eudicots
- Clade: Asterids
- Order: Cornales
- Family: Hydrangeaceae
- Genus: Hydrangea
- Species: H. bretschneideri

Binomial name
- Hydrangea bretschneideri Dippel

Synonyms
- Hydrangea peckinensis Dippel; Hydrangea vestita var. pubescens Maxim.; Hydrangea xanthoneura var. glabrescens (Rehder) Rehder

= Hydrangea bretschneideri =

Species of flowering plant

Hydrangea bretschneideri (Mongolian hydrangea) is a species of flowering plant in the family Hydrangeaceae, native to most of China.

Hydrangea bretschneideri is a sturdy, bushy, deciduous shrub with peeling chestnut-brown bark. It blooms from July to August, producing white lacecap flowers that turn pinkish as they fade. Leaves are mid-green, with a felted underside.
