= Hydrangea linkweiensis =

Scientific classification
- Kingdom: Plantae
- Clade: Tracheophytes
- Clade: Angiosperms
- Clade: Eudicots
- Clade: Asterids
- Order: Cornales
- Family: Hydrangeaceae
- Genus: Hydrangea
- Species: H. linkweiensis

Binomial name
- Hydrangea linkweiensis Chun

Species of flowering plant

Hydrangea linkweiensis is a species of flowering plant in the family Hydrangeaceae, native to China. It grows up to 3 metres (9.8 feet) tall.
