= Hydrangea fauriei =

Scientific classification
- Kingdom: Plantae
- Clade: Tracheophytes
- Clade: Angiosperms
- Clade: Eudicots
- Clade: Asterids
- Order: Cornales
- Family: Hydrangeaceae
- Genus: Hydrangea
- Species: H. fauriei

Binomial name
- Hydrangea fauriei (Hayata) Y.De Smet & C.Granados

Synonyms
- Schizophragma fauriei Hayata; Schizophragma hydrangeoides var. fauriei (Hayata) Hayata; Schizophragma integrifolium var. fauriei (Hayata) Hayata

Species of plant

Hydrangea fauriei, the Taiwanese hydrangea vine, is a species of flowering plant in the family Hydrangeaceae. It is native to Fujian in China, and Taiwan. A liana reaching 15 m (50 ft), it is valued for its fragrant white flowers, and both the unimproved species and its 5 m (16 ft) cultivar 'Angel Wings' are available from commercial nurseries.
