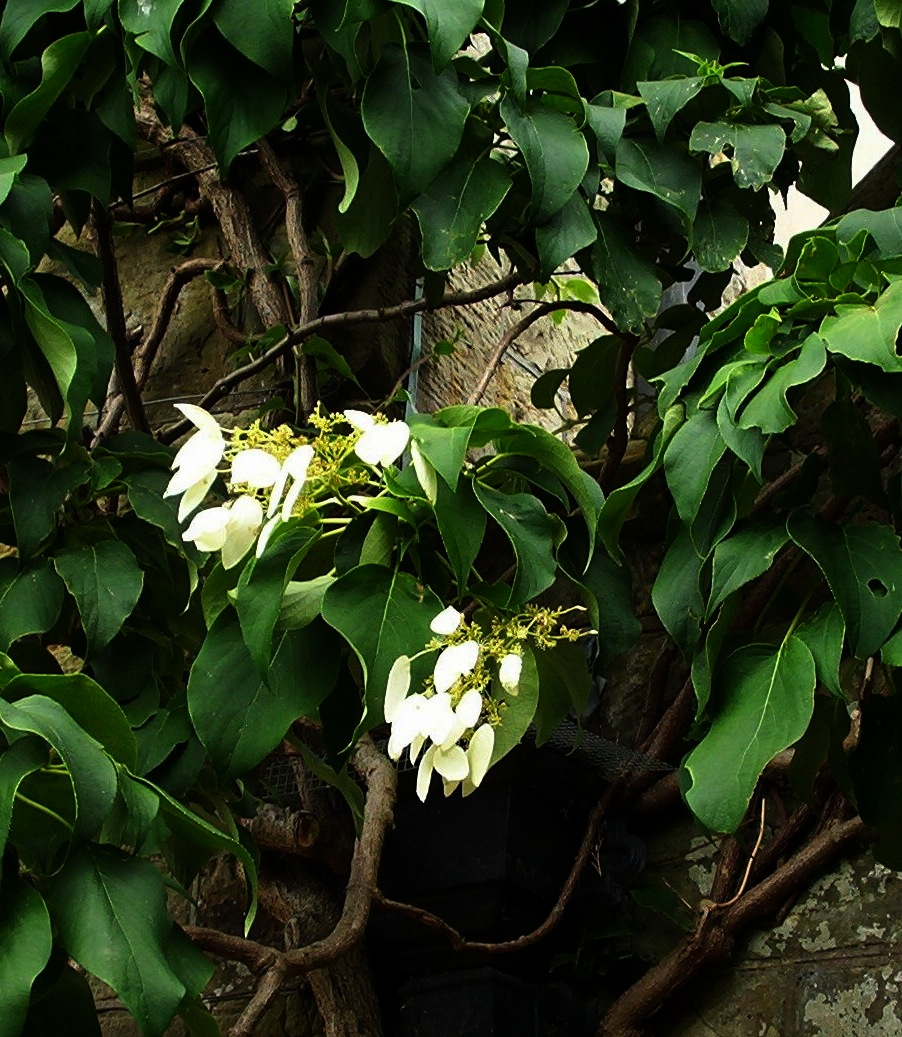
- White bracts extend past the inconspicuous flowers

Scientific classification
- Kingdom: Plantae
- Clade: Tracheophytes
- Clade: Angiosperms
- Clade: Eudicots
- Clade: Asterids
- Order: Cornales
- Family: Hydrangeaceae
- Genus: Hydrangea
- Species: H. glaucescens

Binomial name
- Hydrangea glaucescens (Rehder) Y.De Smet & Granados

Synonyms
- List: Schizophragma elliptifolium C.F.Wei; Schizophragma glaucescens (Rehder) Chun; Schizophragma hypoglaucum Rehder; Schizophragma integrifolium Oliv.; Schizophragma integrifolium var. glaucescens Rehder

= Hydrangea glaucescens =

Species of flowering plant

Hydrangea glaucescens, the Chinese hydrangea vine, is a species of flowering plant in the family of Hydrangeaceae, native to southern China, Myanmar, and Vietnam. Through its synonym Schizophragma integrifolium, it has gained the Royal Horticultural Society's Award of Garden Merit.
