= Hydrangea chungii =

Scientific classification
- Kingdom: Plantae
- Clade: Tracheophytes
- Clade: Angiosperms
- Clade: Eudicots
- Clade: Asterids
- Order: Cornales
- Family: Hydrangeaceae
- Genus: Hydrangea
- Species: H. chungii

Binomial name
- Hydrangea chungii Rehder

Synonyms
- Hydrangea caudatifolia W.T.Wang & M.X.Nie

Species of flowering plant

Hydrangea chungii is a species of flowering plant in the family Hydrangeaceae, native to southeast China. It was formally described by Alfred Rehder in 1931. It is a small shrub that grows up to 0.7 m (2.3 ft) tall.
