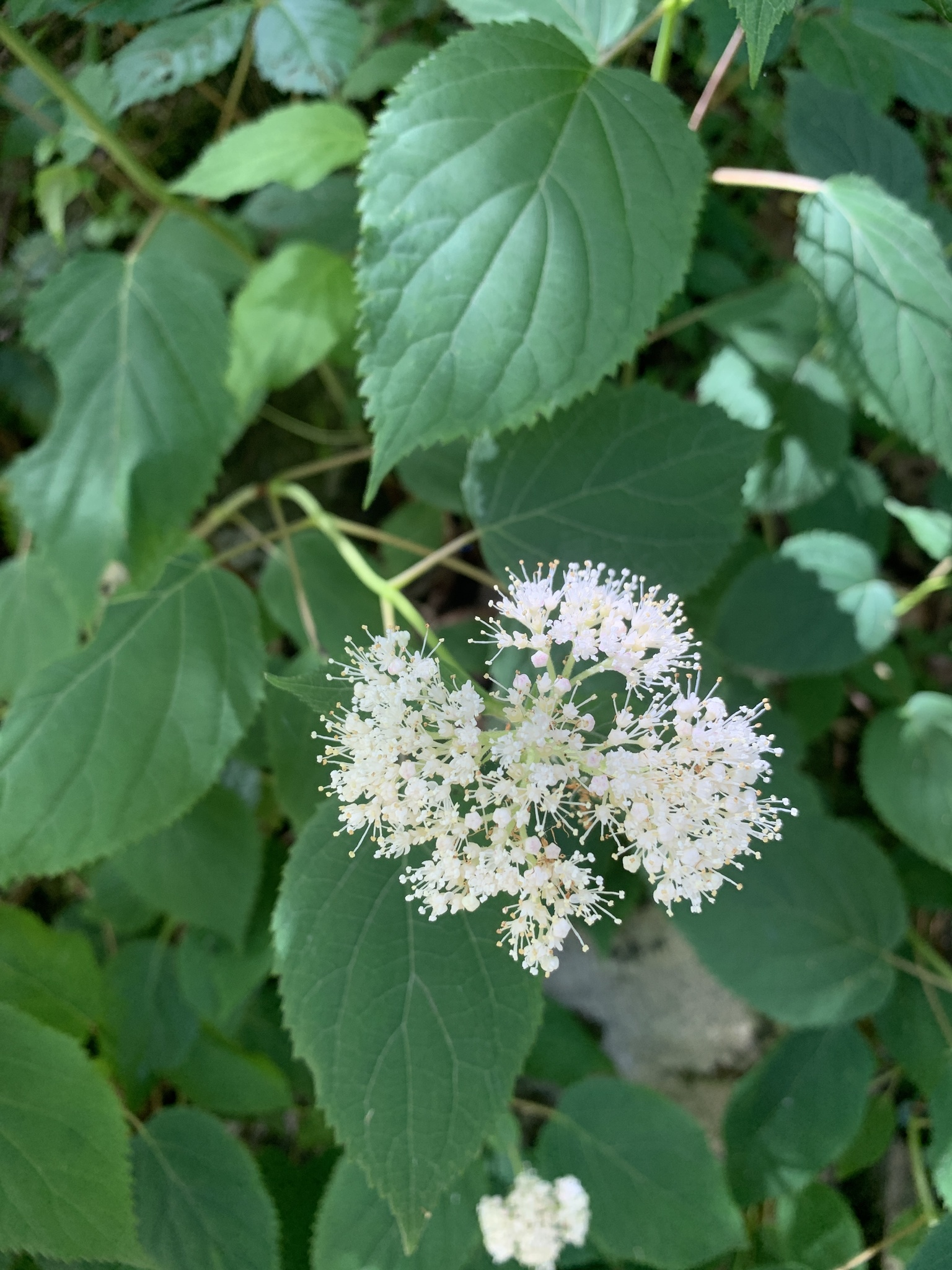
- Hydrangea arborescens in Catoctin Creek Park & Nature Center, Maryland, U.S.

Scientific classification
- Kingdom: Plantae
- Clade: Tracheophytes
- Clade: Angiosperms
- Clade: Eudicots
- Clade: Asterids
- Order: Cornales
- Family: Hydrangeaceae
- Genus: Hydrangea; Gronov. ex L.

Type species
- Hydrangea arborescens L.

Species
- See text

Synonyms
- synonymy: Adamia Wall.; Broussaisia Gaudich.; Calyptranthe (Maxim.) Nakai; Cardiandra Siebold & Zucc.; Cianitis Reinw.; Cornidia Ruiz & Pav.; Decumaria L.; Deinanthe Maxim.; Dichroa Lour.; × Didrangea J.M.H.Shaw; Forsythia Walter; Heteromalla (Rehder) H.Ohba & S.Akiyama; Hortensia Comm. ex Juss.; Hydrangia L.; Macnemaraea Willemet; Pileostegia Hook.f. & Thomson; Platycrater Siebold & Zucc.; Sarcostyles C.Presl ex DC.; Schizophragma Siebold & Zucc.

= Hydrangea =

Genus of flowering plants

Hydrangea (/haɪˈdreɪndʒə/ or /haɪˈdreɪndʒiə/) is a genus of more than 70 species of flowering plants native to Asia and the Americas. Hydrangea is also used as the common name for the genus; some (particularly H. macrophylla) are also often called hortensia. The genus was first described from Virginia in North America, but by far the greatest species diversity is in eastern Asia, notably China, Korea, and Japan. Most are shrubs 1–3 m (3 ft 3 in – 9 ft 10 in) tall, but some are small trees, and others lianas reaching up to 30 m (100 ft) by climbing up trees. They can be either deciduous or evergreen, though the widely cultivated temperate species are all deciduous.

The flowers of many hydrangeas act as natural pH indicators, producing blue flowers when the soil is acidic and pink ones when the soil is alkaline.

== Etymology ==
Hydrangea is derived from Greek and means 'water vessel' (from ὕδωρ húdōr "water" + ἄγγος ángos or ἀγγεῖον angeîon "vessel"), in reference to the shape of its seed capsules. The earlier name, Hortensia, is a Latinised version of the French given name Hortense. Philibert Commerson had attempted to call the flower Lepautia or Peautia in honor of French astronomer and mathematician Nicole-Reine Lepaute, but the common name for the flower instead became Hortensia. This led people to believe that Lepaute's name was Hortense, but the Larousse remarks that this is erroneous, and that the name probably came from hortus, garden.

== Life cycle ==
Hydrangea flowers are produced from early spring to late autumn; they grow in flowerheads (corymbs or panicles) most often at the ends of the stems. Typically the flowerheads contain two types of flowers: small non-showy fertile flowers in the center or interior of the flowerhead, and large, sterile showy flowers with large colorful sepals (tepals). These showy flowers are often extended in a ring, or to the exterior of the small flowers. Plants in wild populations typically have few to none of the showy flowers, while cultivated hydrangeas have been bred and selected to have more of the larger type flowers.

There are two flower arrangements in hydrangeas with corymb style inflorescences, which includes the commonly grown "bigleaf hydrangea"—Hydrangea macrophylla. Mophead flowers are large round flowerheads resembling pom-poms or, as the name implies, the head of a mop. In contrast, lacecap flowers bear round, flat flowerheads with a center core of subdued, small flowers surrounded by outer rings of larger flowers having showy sepals or tepals. The flowers of some rhododendrons and viburnums can appear, at first glance, similar to those of some hydrangeas.

== Colors and soil acidity ==
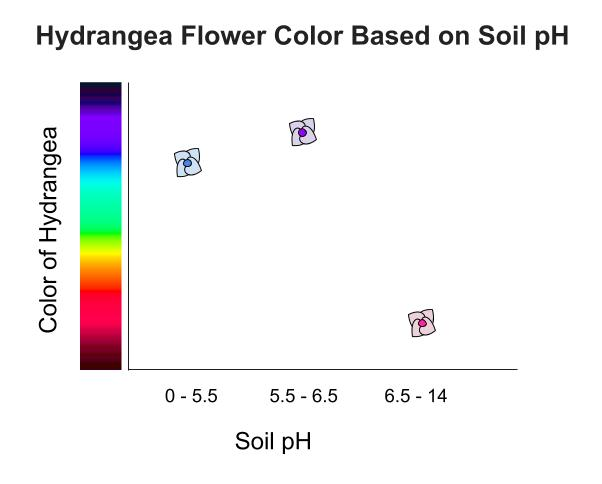
Hydrangea flower color changes based on the pH in soil. As the graph depicts, soil with a pH of 5.5 or lower will produce blue flowers, a pH of 6.5 or higher will produce pink hydrangeas, and soil in between 5.5 and 6.5 will have purple hydrangeas.

Hydrangea flower color can change based on the pH in soil. As the graph depicts, soil with a pH of 5.5 or lower will produce blue flowers, a pH of 6.5 or higher will produce pink hydrangeas, and soil in between 5.5 and 6.5 will have purple hydrangeas. White hydrangeas can not be color-manipulated by soil pH because they do not produce pigment for color. In other words, while the hue of the inflorescence is variable dependent upon cultural factors, the color saturation is genetically predetermined. In most species, the flowers are white. In some, however (notably H. macrophylla), they can be blue, red, or purple, with color saturation levels ranging from the palest of pinks, lavenders and powder blues, to deep, rich purples, reds, and royal blues. In these species, floral color change occurs due to the availability of aluminium ions, a variable which itself depends upon the soil pH. For H. macrophylla and H. serrata cultivars, the flower color can be determined by the relative acidity of the soil: an acidic soil (pH below 7), will have available aluminium ions and typically produce flowers that are blue to purple, whereas an alkaline soil (pH above 7) will tie up aluminium ions and result in pink or red flowers. This is caused by a color change of the flower pigments in the presence of aluminium ions which can be taken up into hyperaccumulating plants.

== Species ==
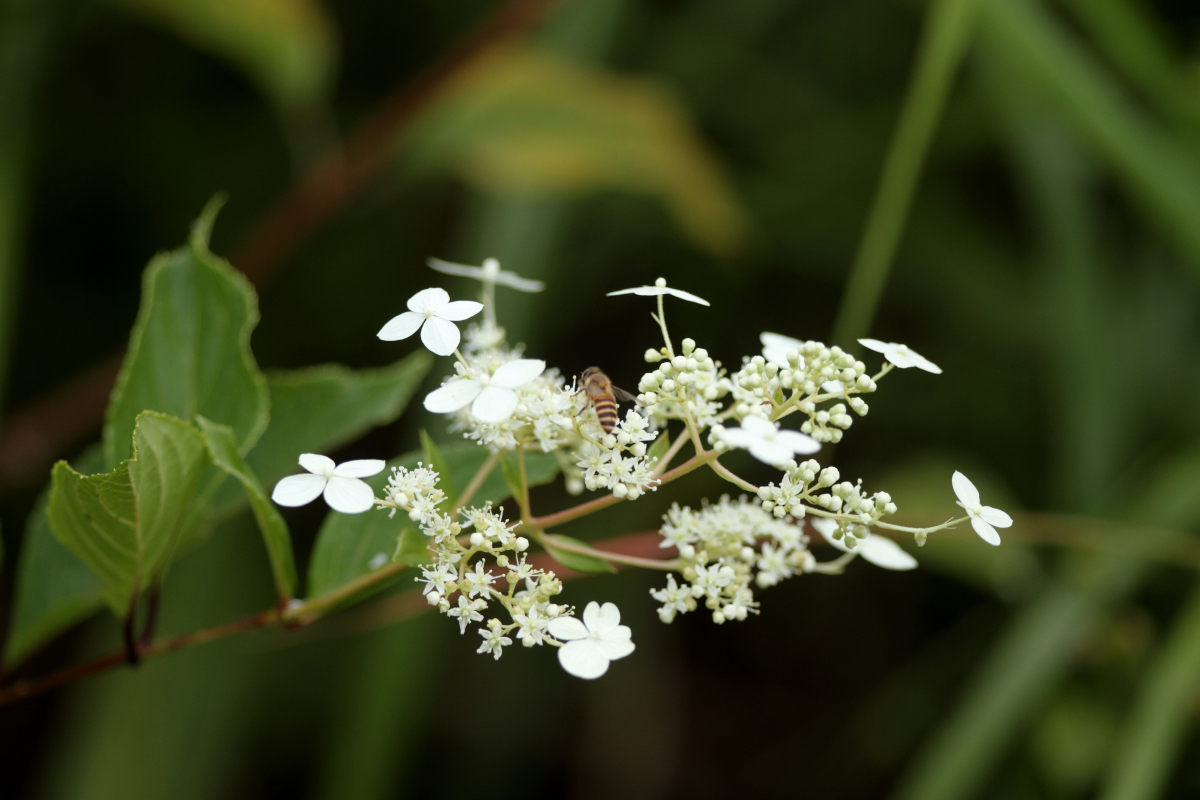
Hydrangea paniculata

98 species are accepted.

- Hydrangea acuminata Siebold & Zucc.
- Hydrangea albostellata Samain, Najarro & E.Martínez
- Hydrangea alternifolia Siebold
- Hydrangea × amagiana Makino
- Hydrangea amamiohsimensis (Koidz.) Y.De Smet & Granados
- Hydrangea ampla (Chun) Y.De Smet & Granados
- Hydrangea anomala D.Don – (climbing hydrangea) Himalaya, southwest China
- Hydrangea arborescens L. – (smooth hydrangea) eastern North America
- Hydrangea arguta (Gaudich.) Y.De Smet & Granados – Hawaii
- Hydrangea aspera Buch.-Ham. ex D.Don – China, Himalaya
- Hydrangea asterolasia Diels
- Hydrangea barbara (L.) Bernd Schulz
- Hydrangea bifida (Maxim.) Y.De Smet & Granados
- Hydrangea breedlovei Samain, Najarro & E.Martínez
- Hydrangea bretschneideri Dippel – China
- Hydrangea caerulea (Stapf) Y.De Smet & Granados
- Hydrangea carroniae Samain & E.Martínez
- Hydrangea chungii Rehder – China
- Hydrangea cinerea Small – (ashy hydrangea) eastern United States
- Hydrangea coenobialis Chun – China
- Hydrangea corylifolia (Chun) Y.De Smet & Granados
- Hydrangea crassa (Hand.-Mazz.) Y.De Smet & Granados
- Hydrangea daimingshanensis (Y.C.Wu) Y.De Smet & Granados
- Hydrangea davidii Franch. – China
- Hydrangea densifolia (C.F.Wei) Y.De Smet & Granados
- Hydrangea diplostemona (Donn.Sm.) Standl.
- Hydrangea fauriei (Hayata) Y.De Smet & Granados
- Hydrangea febrifuga (Lour.) Y.De Smet & Granados (syn. Dichroa febrifuga) – central & southern China to Malesia and New Guinea
- Hydrangea glaucescens (Rehder) Y.De Smet & Granados – China, Myanmar and Vietnam
- Hydrangea gracilis W.T.Wang & M.X.Nie – China
- Hydrangea heteromalla D.Don – Himalaya, west and north China
- Hydrangea hirsuta (Gagnep.) Y.De Smet & Granados
- Hydrangea hirta (Thunb.) Siebold – Japan
- Hydrangea hwangii J.M.H.Shaw
- Hydrangea hydrangeoides (Siebold & Zucc.) Bernd Schulz – Ulleungdo, Japan, Kurils
- Hydrangea hypoglauca Rehder – China
- Hydrangea integrifolia Hayata – China
- Hydrangea involucrata Siebold – Japan, Taiwan
- Hydrangea jelskii Szyszył. – Andes
- Hydrangea kawagoeana Koidz.
- Hydrangea kwangsiensis Hu – China
- Hydrangea kwangtungensis Merr. – China
- Hydrangea lalashanensis S.S.Ying
- Hydrangea lingii G.Hoo – China
- Hydrangea linkweiensis Chun – China
- Hydrangea liukiuensis Nakai
- Hydrangea lobbii Maxim.
- Hydrangea longifolia Hayata – China
- Hydrangea longipes Franch. – western China
- Hydrangea luteovenosa Koidz.
- Hydrangea macrocarpa Hand.-Mazz. – China
- Hydrangea macrophylla (Thunb.) Ser. – (bigleaf hydrangea) southeast Japan, southern China
- Hydrangea mangshanensis C.F.Wei – China
- Hydrangea marunoi Tagane & S.Fujii
- Hydrangea mathewsii Briq.
- Hydrangea megalocarpa (Chun) J.M.H.Shaw
- Hydrangea minamitanii (H.Ohba) Yahara
- Hydrangea × mizushimarum H.Ohba
- Hydrangea moellendorffii Hance
- Hydrangea mollissima (Merr.) Y.De Smet & Granados
- Hydrangea nahaensis Samain & E.Martínez
- Hydrangea nebulicola Nevling & Gómez Pompa
- Hydrangea obtusifolia (Hu) Y.De Smet & Granados
- Hydrangea ofeliae Sodusta & Lumawag
- Hydrangea otontepecensis Samain & E.Martínez
- Hydrangea paniculata Siebold – (panicled hydrangea) eastern China, Japan, Korea, Sakhalin
- Hydrangea peruviana Moric. ex Ser. – Costa Rica and Panama, Andes
- Hydrangea petiolaris Siebold & Zucc. – (climbing hydrangea) Japan, Korea, Sakhalin
- Hydrangea pingtungensis S.S.Ying
- Hydrangea platyarguta Y.De Smet & Samain
- Hydrangea pottingeri Prain (synonym Hydrangea chinensis Maxim.) – Arunachal Pradesh, Myanmar, southeastern China, and Taiwan
- Hydrangea preslii Briq.
- Hydrangea quercifolia W.Bartram – (oakleaf hydrangea) southeast United States
- Hydrangea radiata Walter – (silverleaf hydrangea) southeast United States
- Hydrangea robusta Hook.f. & Thomson – China, Himalaya
- Hydrangea sargentiana Rehder – western China
- Hydrangea scandens (L.f.) Ser. – southern Japan south to the Philippines
- Hydrangea seemannii L.Riley - northern Mexico, to Nayarit
- Hydrangea serrata (Thunb.) Ser. – Japan, Korea
- Hydrangea serratifolia (Thunb.) Ser. – Chile, western Argentina
- Hydrangea sikokiana Maxim.
- Hydrangea sousae Samain, Najarro & E.Martínez
- Hydrangea steyermarkii Standl.
- Hydrangea strigosa Rehder – China
- Hydrangea stylosa Hook.f. & Thomson – China
- Hydrangea taiwaniana Y.C.Liu & F.Y.Lu
- Hydrangea tapalapensis Samain, Najarro & E.Martínez
- Hydrangea tarapotensis Briq. – Andes
- Hydrangea tomentella (Hand.-Mazz.) Y.De Smet & Granados
- Hydrangea × versicolor (Fortune) J.M.H.Shaw
- Hydrangea viburnoides (Hook.f. & Thomson) Y.De Smet & Granados
- Hydrangea wallichii J.M.H.Shaw
- Hydrangea xanthoneura Diels – China
- Hydrangea xinfeniae W.B.Ju & J.Ru
- Hydrangea yaoshanensis (Y.C.Wu) Y.De Smet & Granados
- Hydrangea yayeyamensis Koidz.
- Hydrangea × ytiensis (J.M.H.Shaw) J.M.H.Shaw
- Hydrangea yunnanensis Rehder
- Hydrangea zhewanensis P.S.Hsu & X.P.Zhang – China

== Fossil record ==
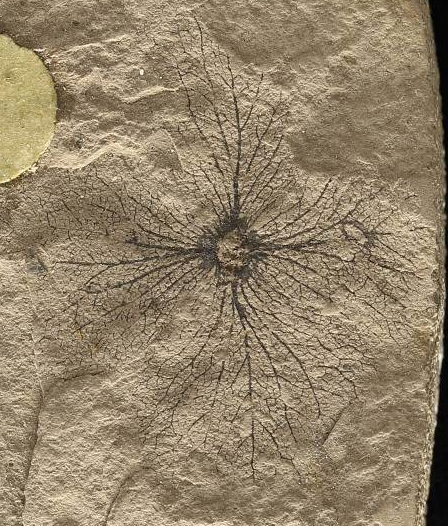
Hydrangea knowltoni

†Hydrangea alaskana is a fossil species recovered from Paleogene strata at Jaw Mountain Alaska. †Hydrangea knowltoni has been described from leaves and flowers recovered from the Miocene Langhian Latah Formation of the inland Pacific Northwest United states. The related Miocene species †Hydrangea bendirei is known to from the Mascall Formation in Oregon, and †Hydrangea reticulata is documented from the Weaverville Formation in California.

Four fossil seeds of †Hydrangea polonica have been extracted from borehole samples of the Middle Miocene fresh water deposits in Nowy Sacz Basin, West Carpathians, Poland.

== Cultivation and uses ==
Hydrangeas are popular ornamental plants, grown for their large flowerheads, with Hydrangea macrophylla being by far the most widely grown. It has over 600 named cultivars, many selected to have only large sterile flowers in the flowerheads. Hydrangea macrophylla, also known as bigleaf hydrangea, can be broken up into two main categories; mophead hydrangea and lacecap hydrangea. Some are best pruned on an annual basis when the new leaf buds begin to appear. If not pruned regularly, the bush will become very "leggy", growing upwards until the weight of the stems is greater than their strength, at which point the stems will sag down to the ground and possibly break. Other species only flower on "old wood". Thus, new wood resulting from pruning will not produce flowers until the following season.

The following cultivars and species have gained the Royal Horticultural Society's Award of Garden Merit under the synonym Schizophragma:

- S. hydrangeoides var. concolor 'Moonlight'
- S. hydrangeoides var. hydrangeoides 'Roseum'
- S. integrifolium

Hydrangea root and rhizome are indicated for the treatment of conditions of the urinary tract in the Physicians' Desk Reference for Herbal Medicine and may have diuretic properties. Hydrangeas are moderately toxic if eaten, with all parts of the plant containing cyanogenic glycosides. Hydrangea paniculata is reportedly sometimes smoked as an intoxicant, despite the danger of illness and/or death due to the cyanide.

The flowers on a hydrangea shrub can change from blue to pink or from pink to blue from one season to the next depending on the acidity level of the soil. Adding organic materials such as coffee grounds and citrus peel will increase acidity and turn hydrangea flowers blue. A popular pink hydrangea called Vanilla Strawberry has been named "Top Plant" by the American Nursery and Landscape Association.

A hybrid "Runaway Bride Snow White", from Japan, won Plant of the Year at the 2018 RHS Chelsea Flower Show.

=== In culture ===
In Japan, ama-cha (甘茶), meaning sweet tea, is another herbal tea made from Hydrangea serrata, whose leaves contain a substance that develops a sweet taste (phyllodulcin). For the fullest taste, fresh leaves are crumpled, steamed, and dried, yielding dark brown tea leaves. Ama-cha is mainly used for kan-butsu-e (the Buddha bathing ceremony) on April 8 every year—the day thought to be Buddha's birthday in Japan. During the ceremony, ama-cha is poured over a statue of Buddha and served to people in attendance. A legend has it that on the day Buddha was born, nine dragons poured Amrita over him; ama-cha is substituted for Amrita in Japan.

In Korean tea, Hydrangea serrata is used for an herbal tea called sugukcha (수국차) or isulcha (이슬차).

The pink hydrangea has risen in popularity all over the world, especially in Asia. The given meaning of pink hydrangeas is popularly tied to the phrase "you are the beat of my heart," as described by the celebrated Korean florist Tan Jun Yong, who was quoted saying, "The light delicate blush of the petals reminds me of a beating heart, while the size could only match the heart of the sender!"

Hydrangea quercifolia was declared the official state wildflower of the U.S. state of Alabama in 1999.

Hydrangeas were used by the Cherokee people of what is now the Southern U.S. as a mild diuretic and cathartic; it was considered a valuable remedy for bladder stones.

Extrafloral nectaries were reported on hydrangea species by Zimmerman 1932, but Elias 1983 regards this as "doubtful".

The UK national collection of hydrangea is held at Darley Park, a public park run by Derby City Council. In August 2026 the Royal Horticultural Society was considering moving its hydrangea collection from Wisley, Surrey, to its northern gardens in Greater Manchester and North Yorkshire, as a result of climate change.

== Gallery ==
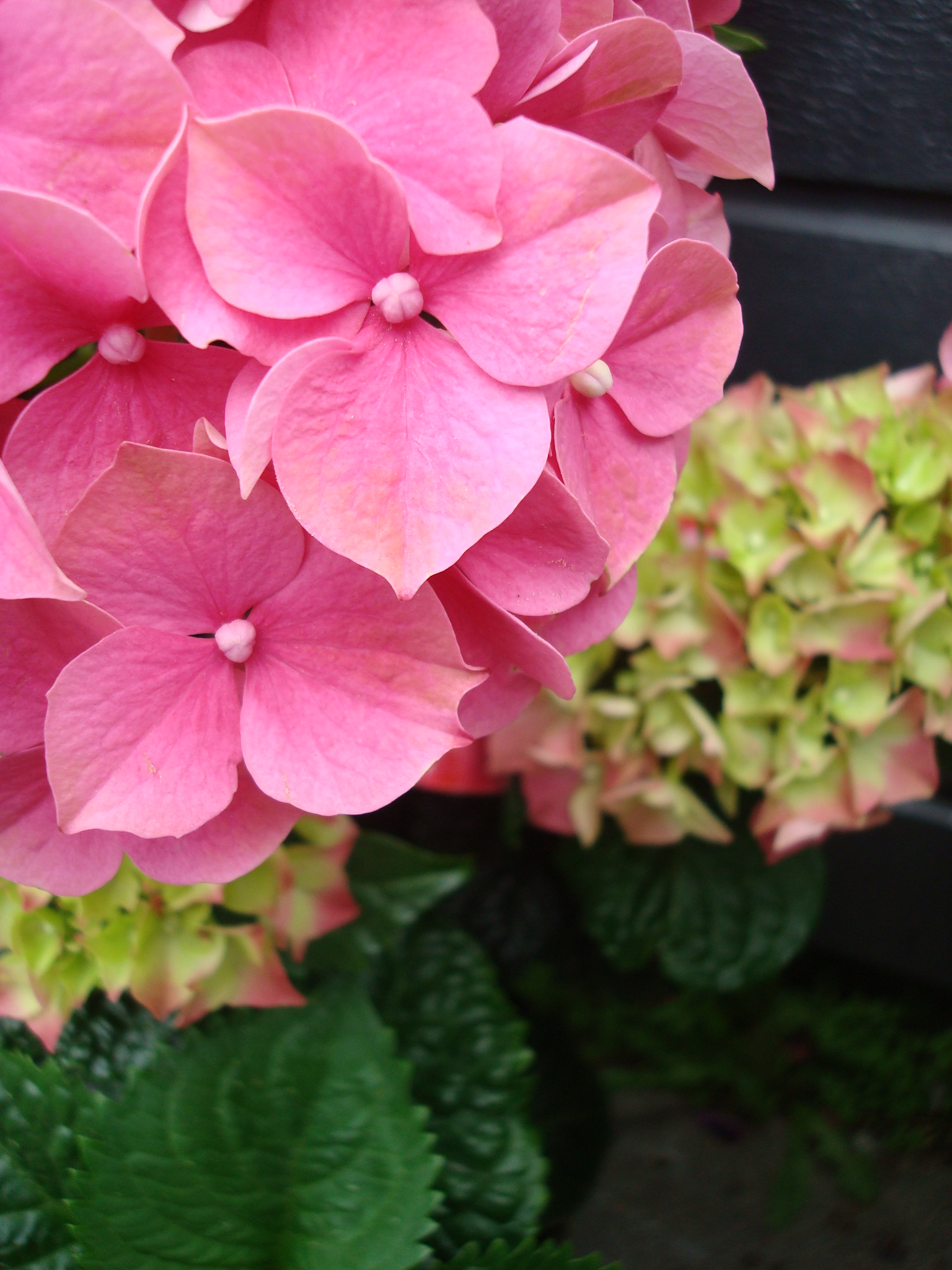
Hydrangea macrophylla

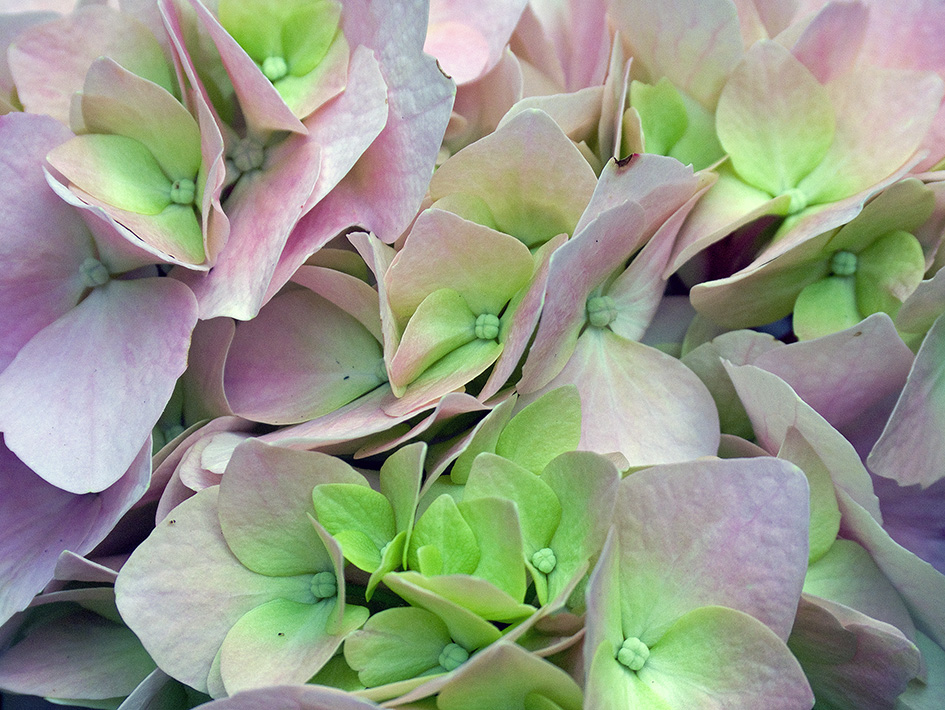
Hydrangea flowers close up

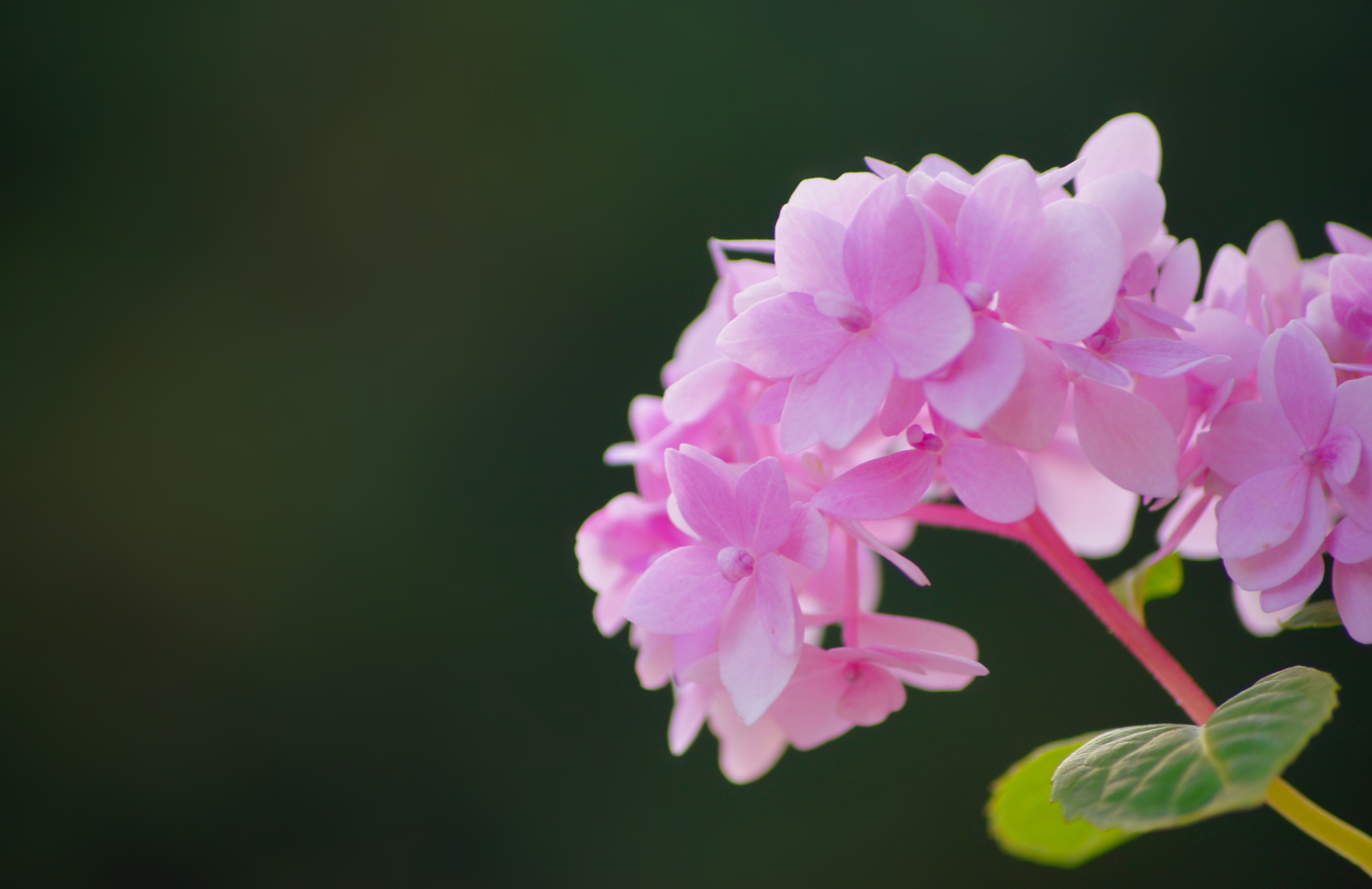
Flowers

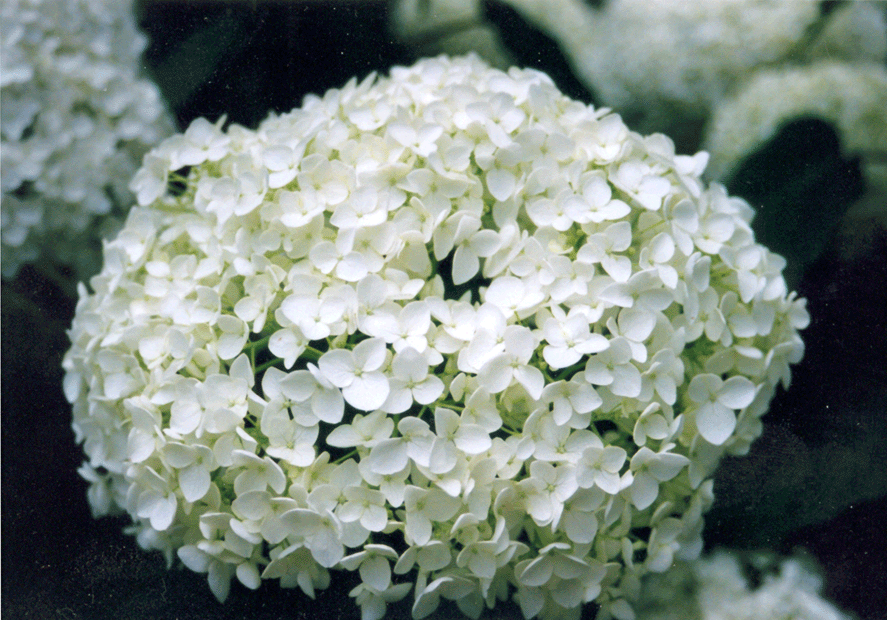
Hydrangea macrophylla, flowers

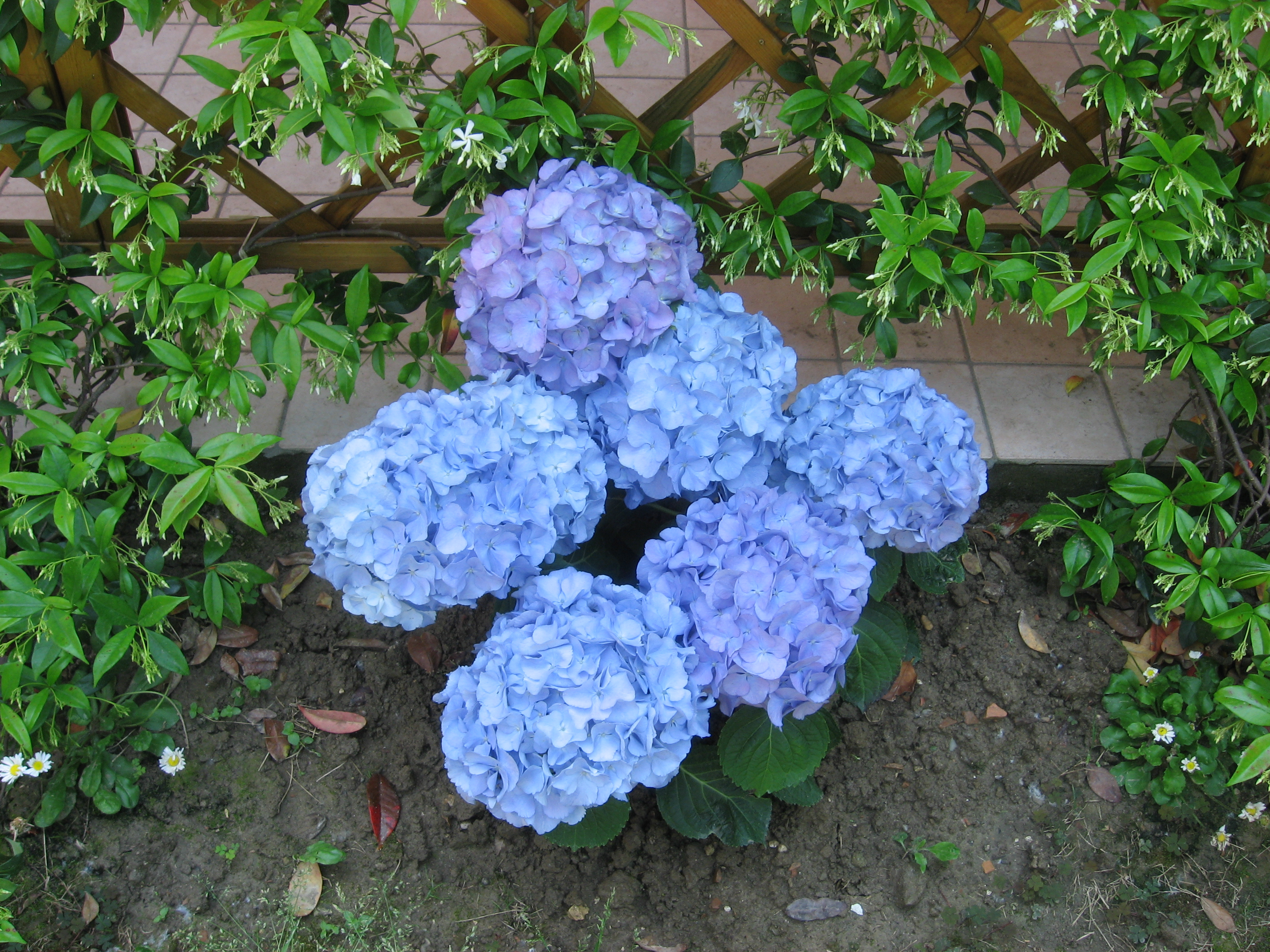
Hydrangea macrophylla, flowers

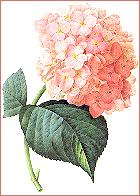
Hydrangea sp painted by the botanical artist Redouté

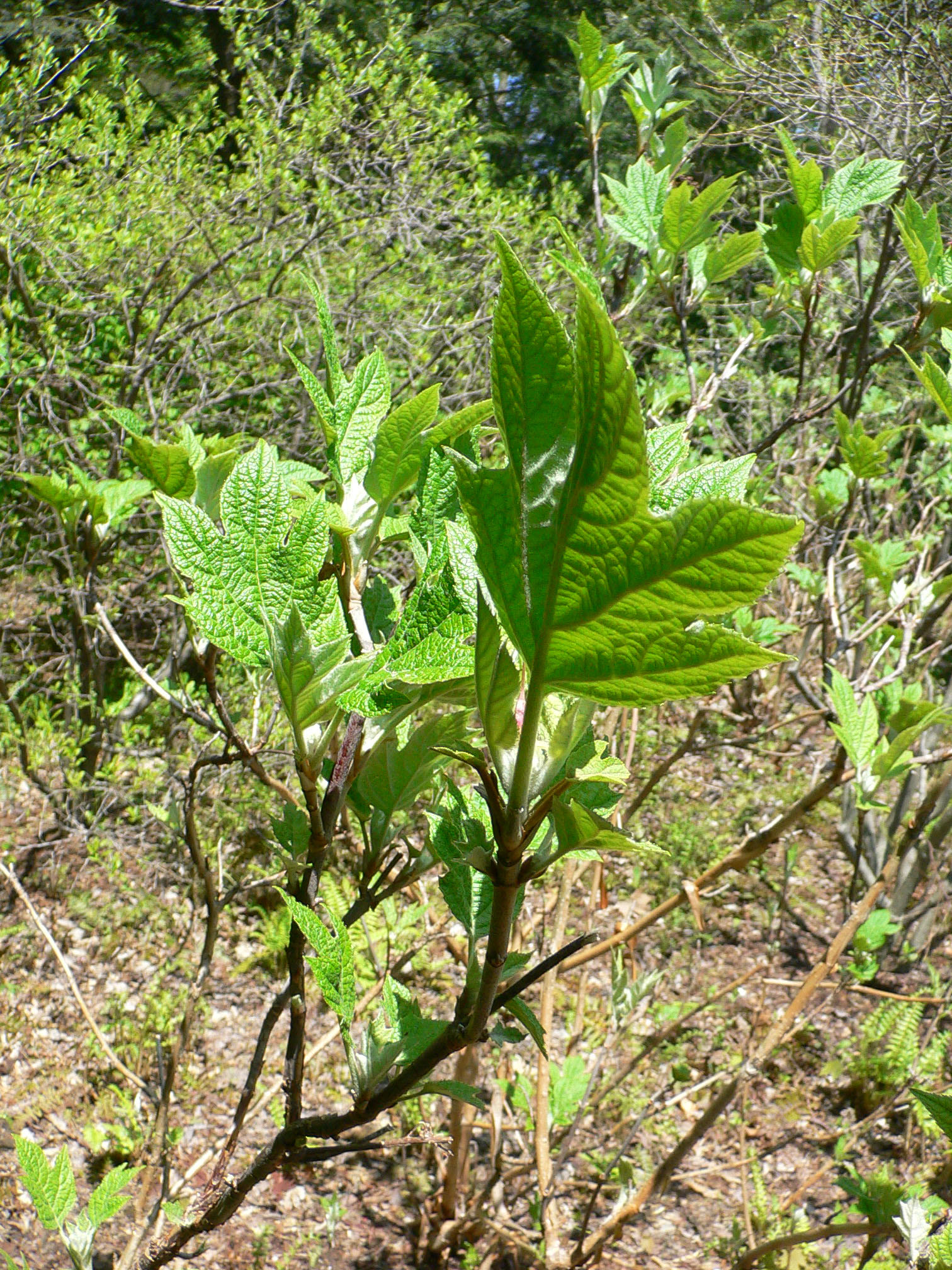
Hydrangea quercifolia

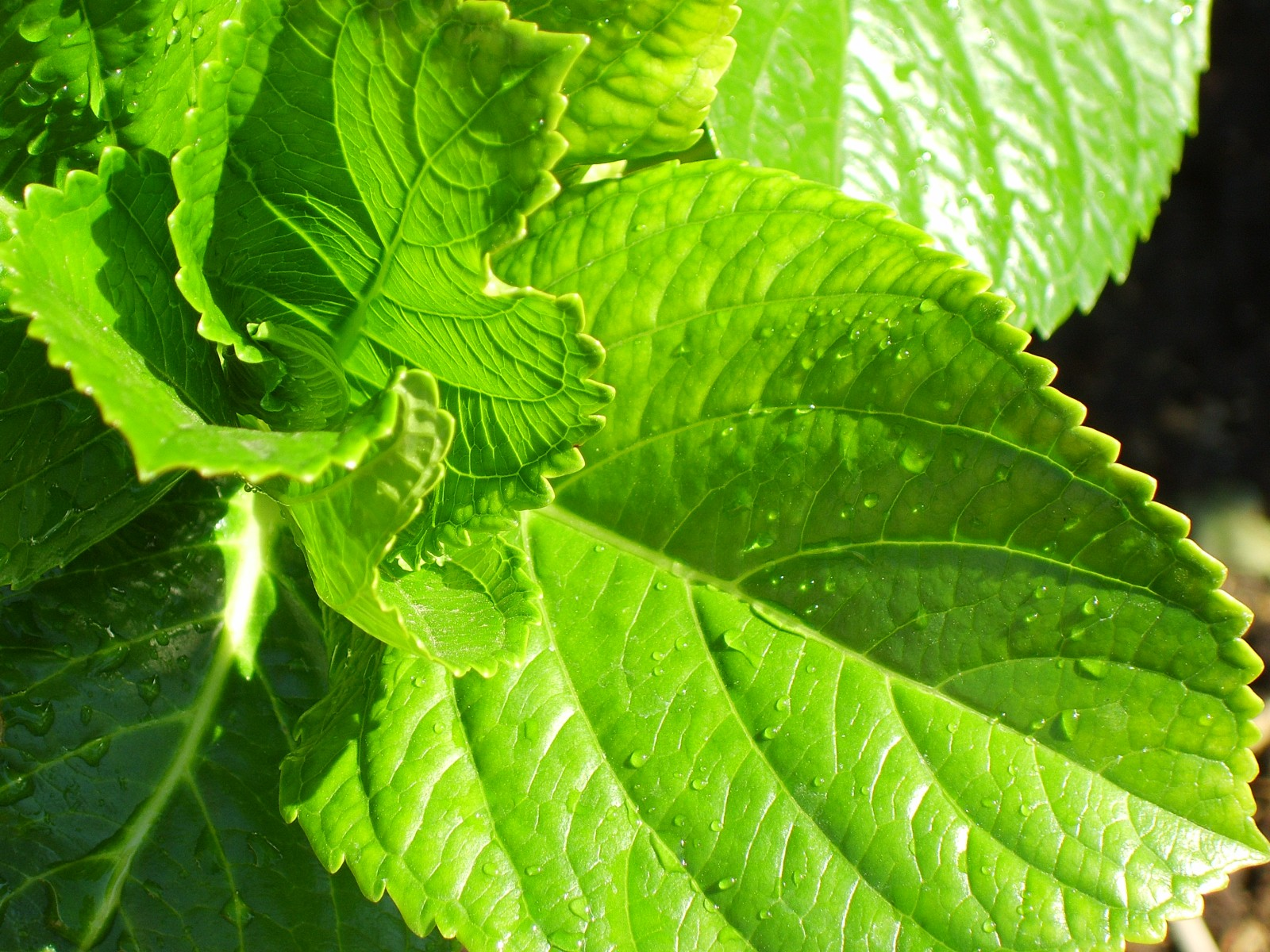
Hydrangea macrophylla, leaves

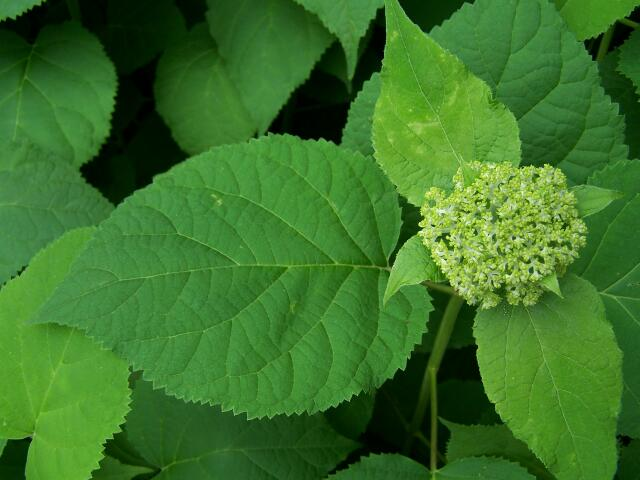
Wild Hydrangea v. Annabelle
Hydrangea arborescens

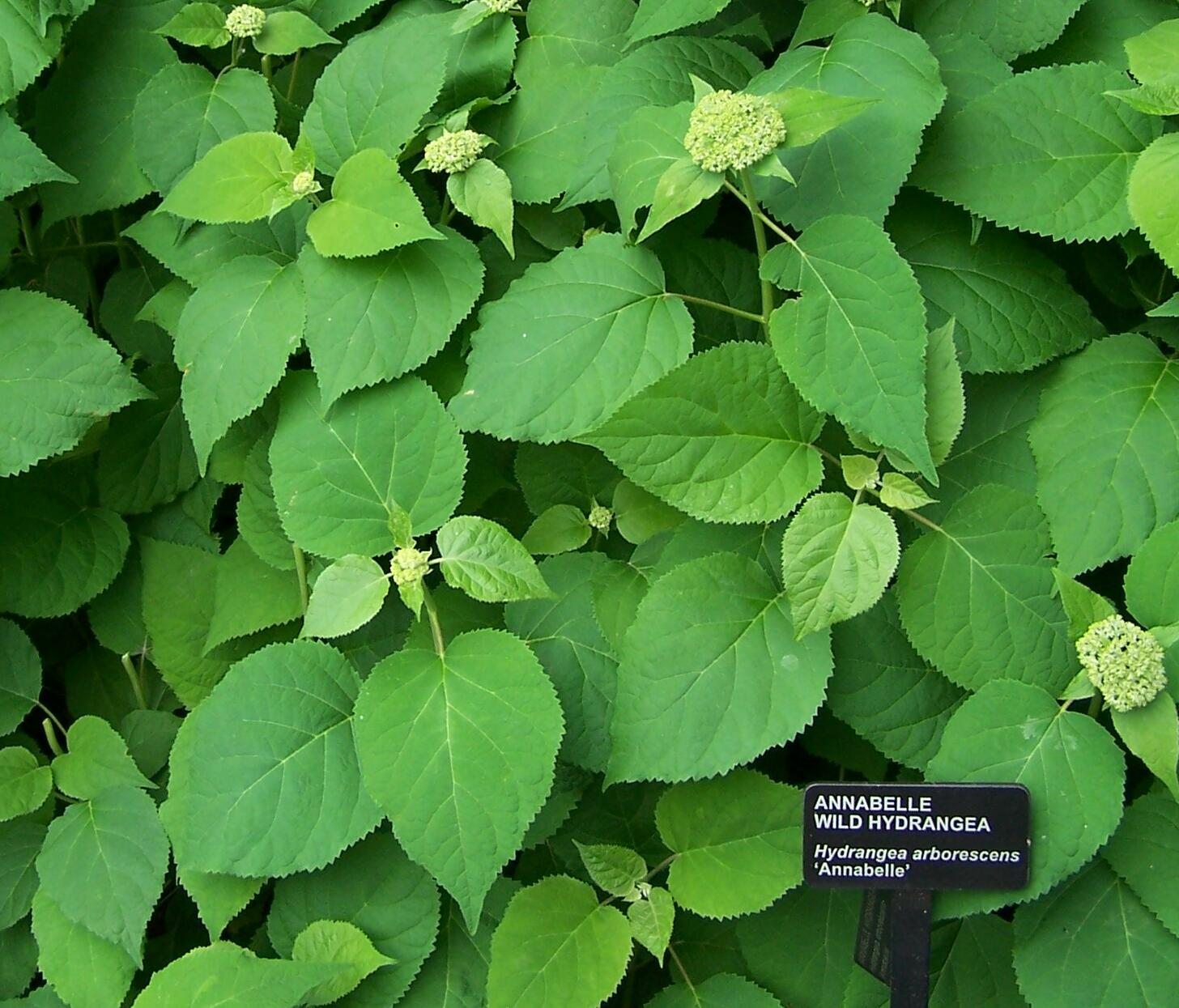
Wild Hydrangea v. Annabelle
Hydrangea arborescens

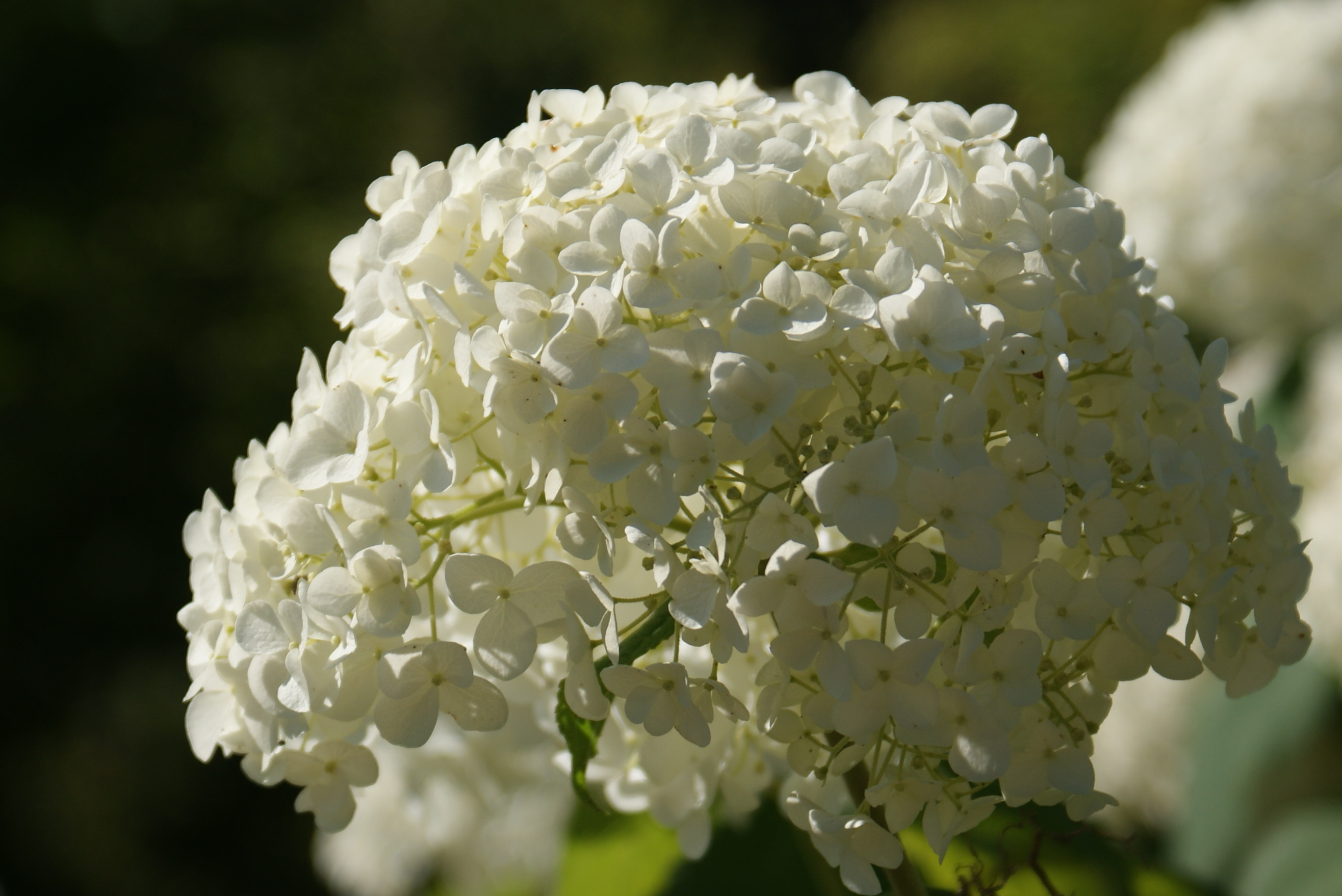
8" Annabelle Hydrangea Bloom. Hydrangea arborescens.

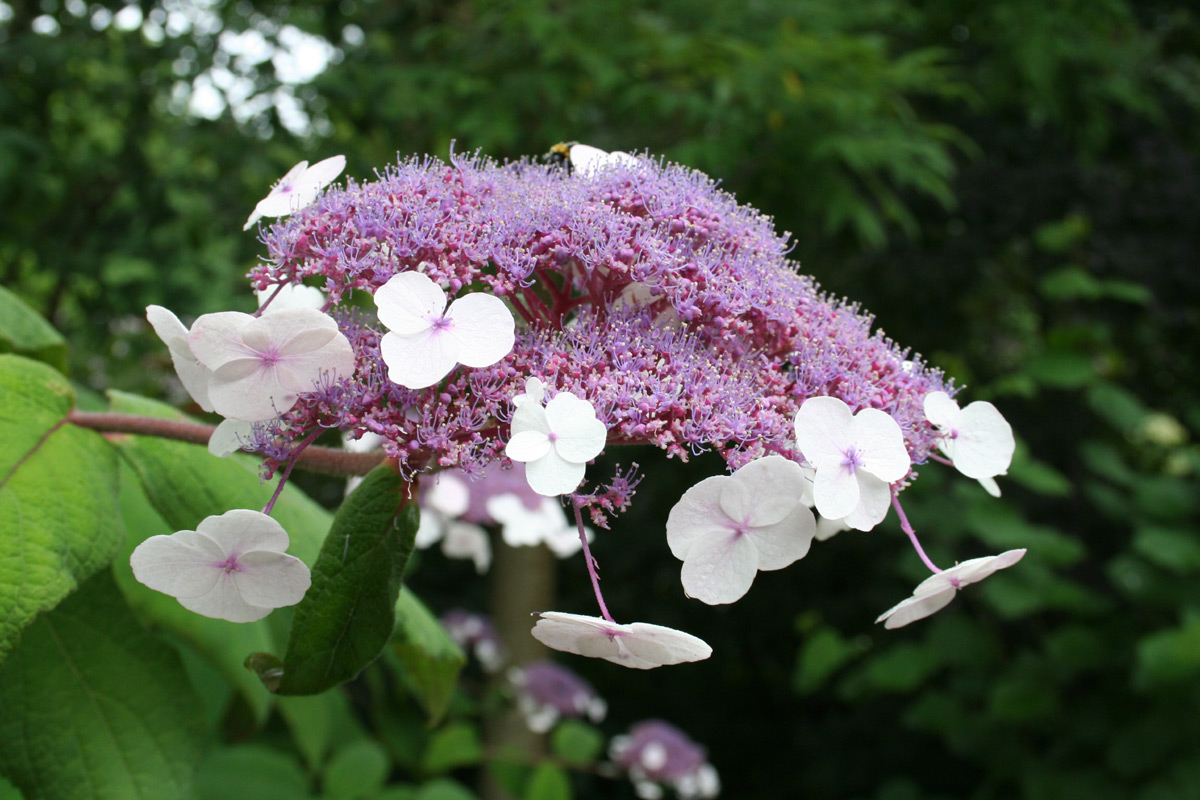
Hydrangea aspera ssp. sargentiana

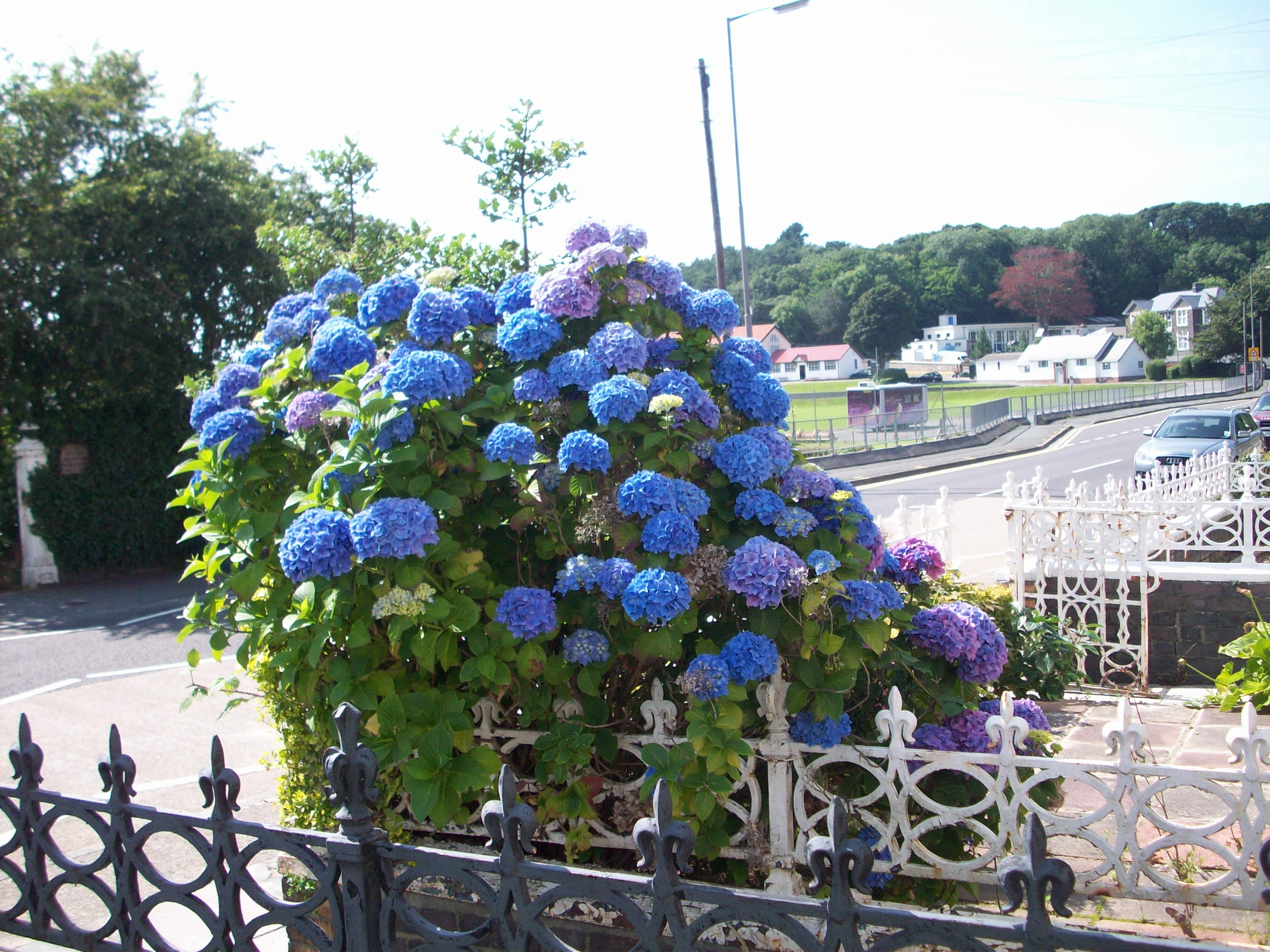

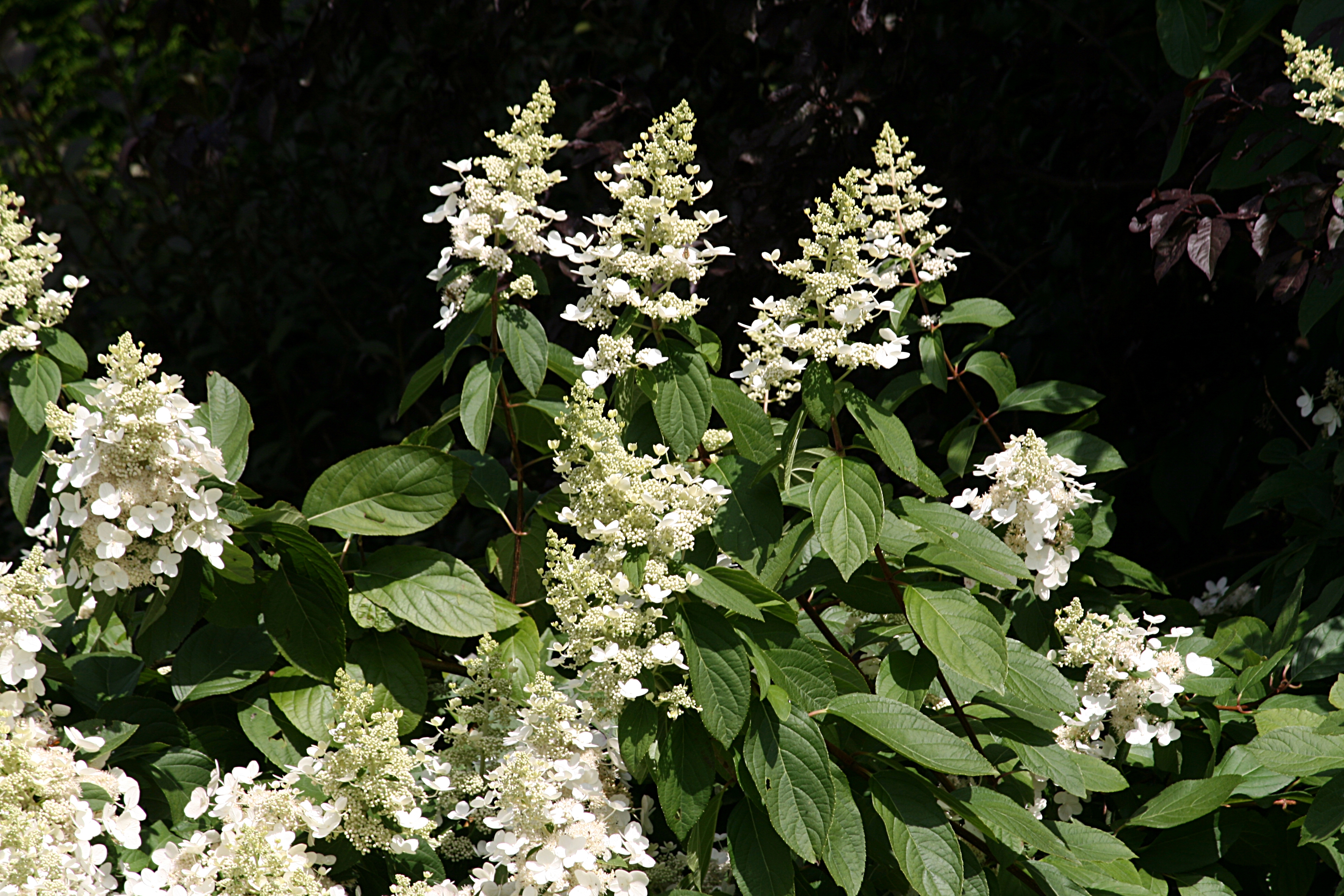
Hydrangea paniculata

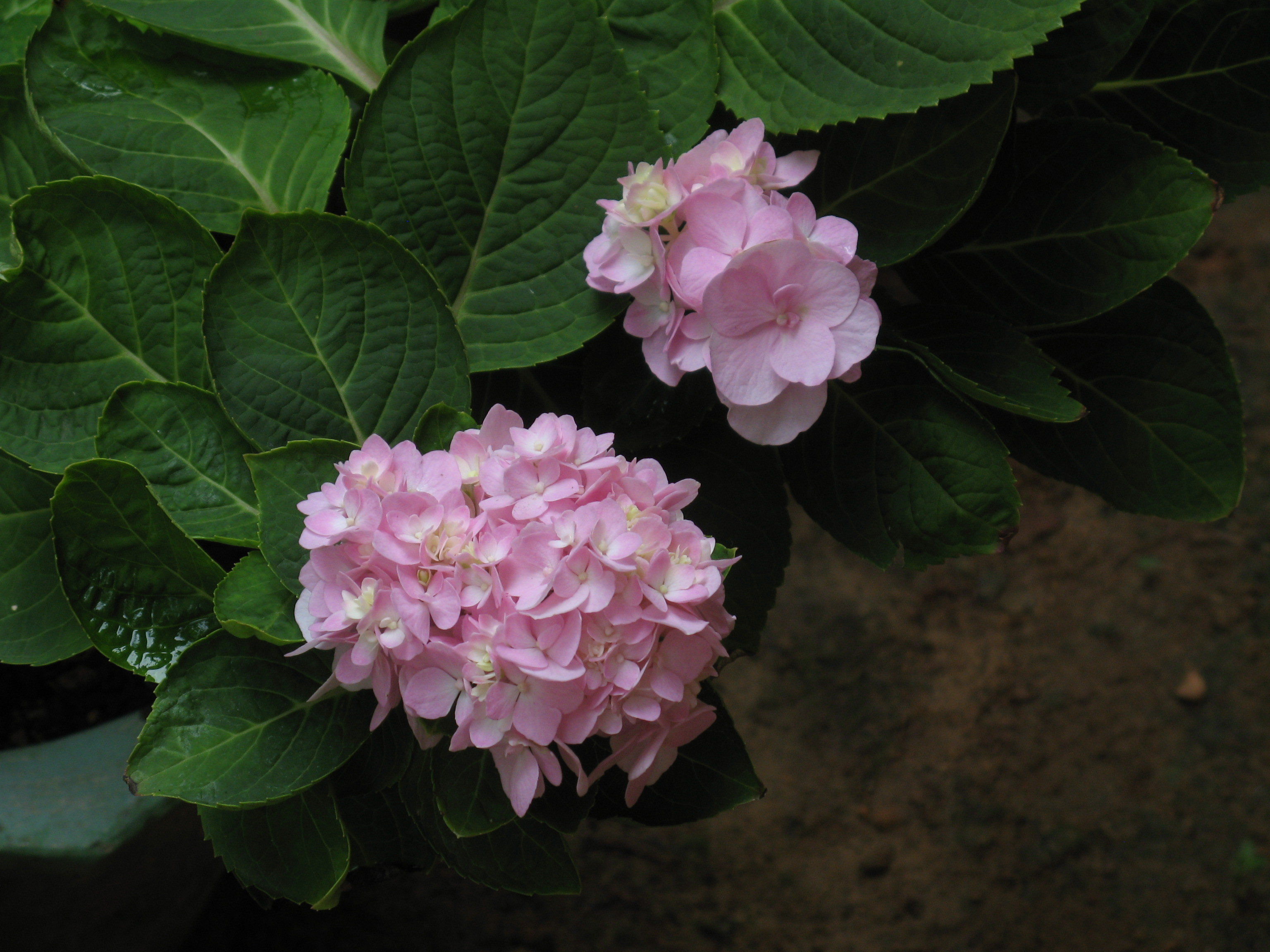
Hydrangea flowers from Kerala, India

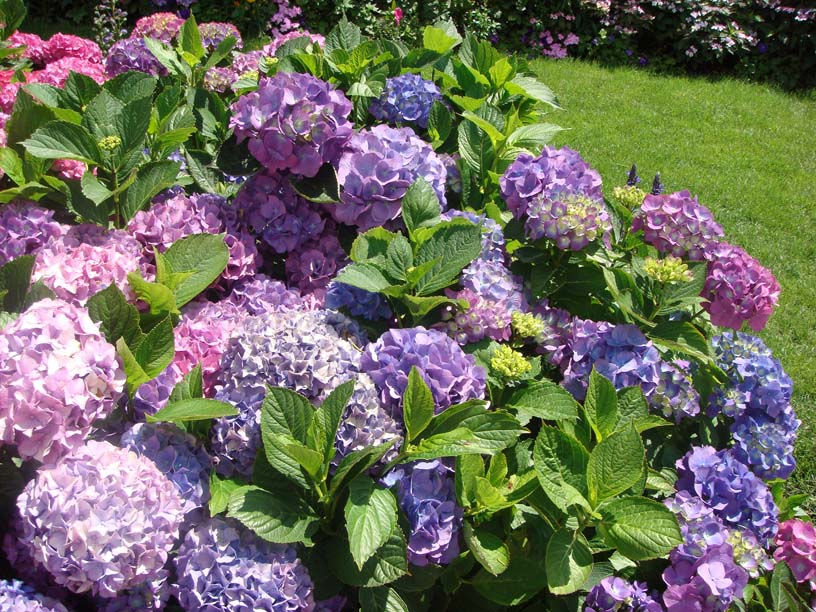
Hydrangeas in front of the Office de Tourisme Building in Chartres, France

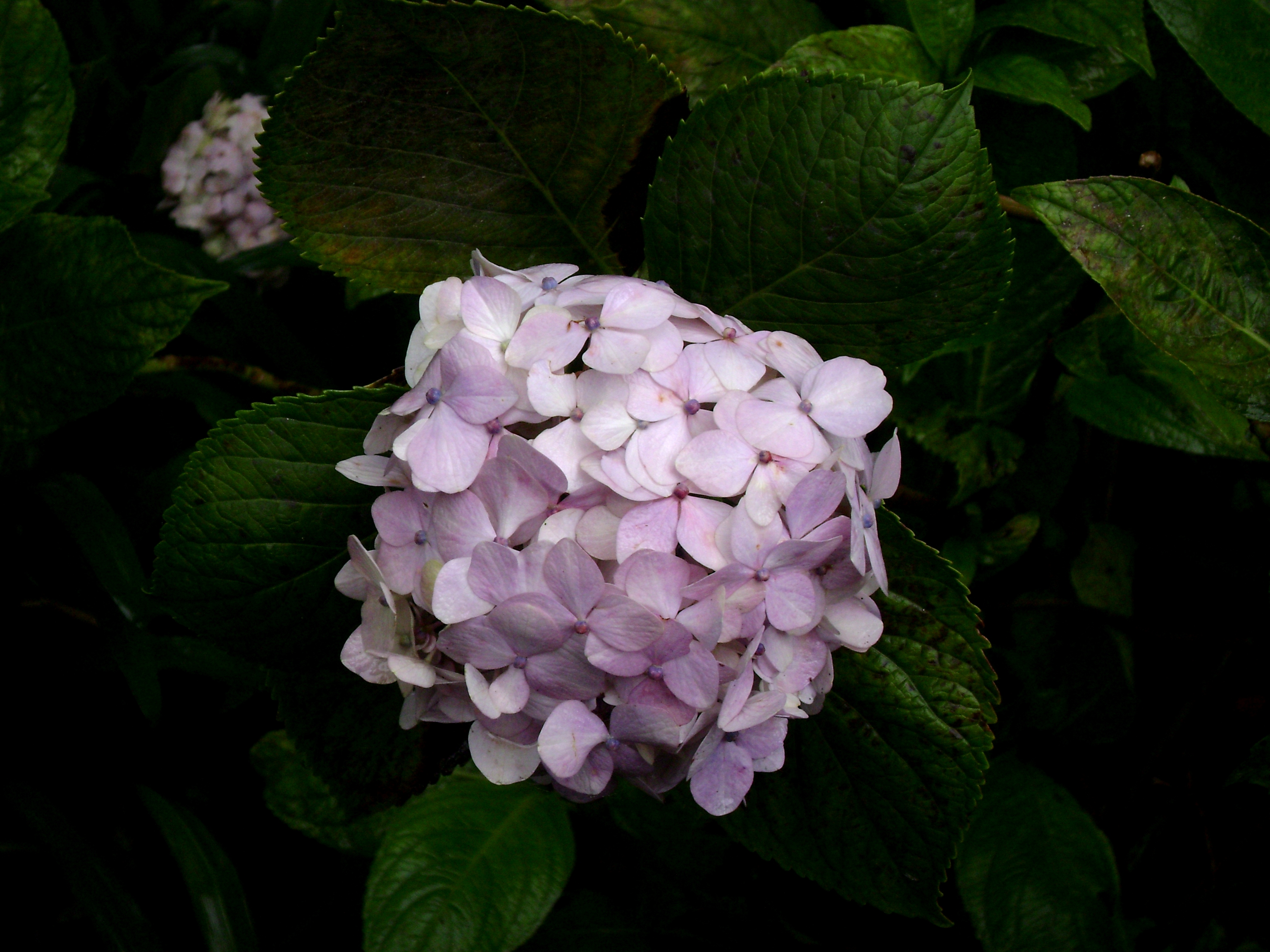
Hydrangea flowers at the "Cerro El Avila" National Park, Venezuela

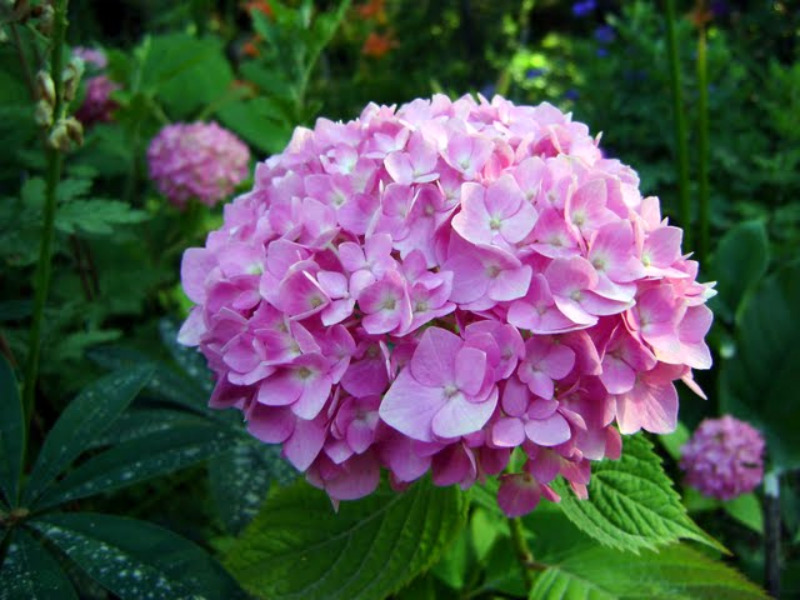
Hydrangea flowers, Srinagar, Kashmir, India

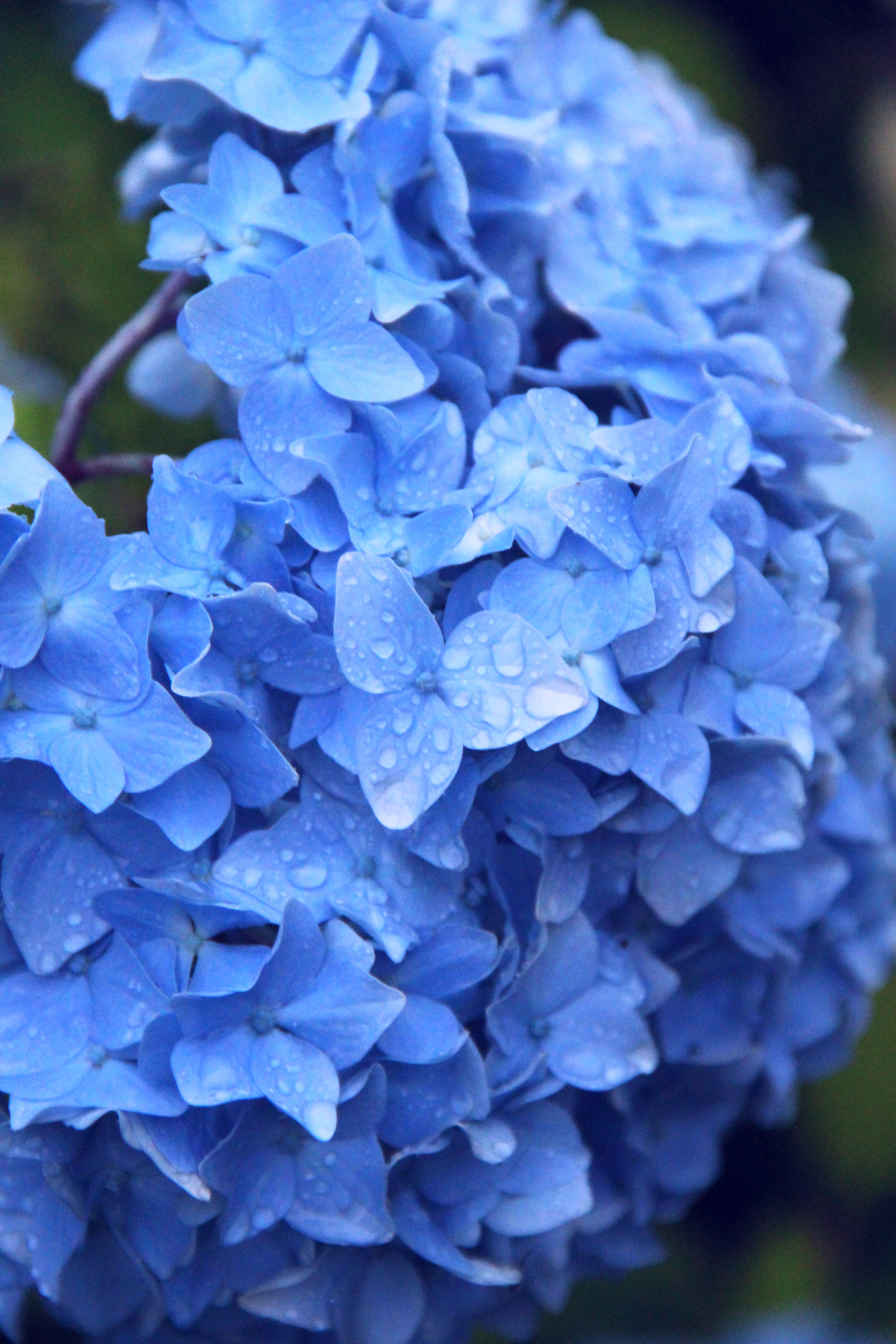
Hydrangea flowers

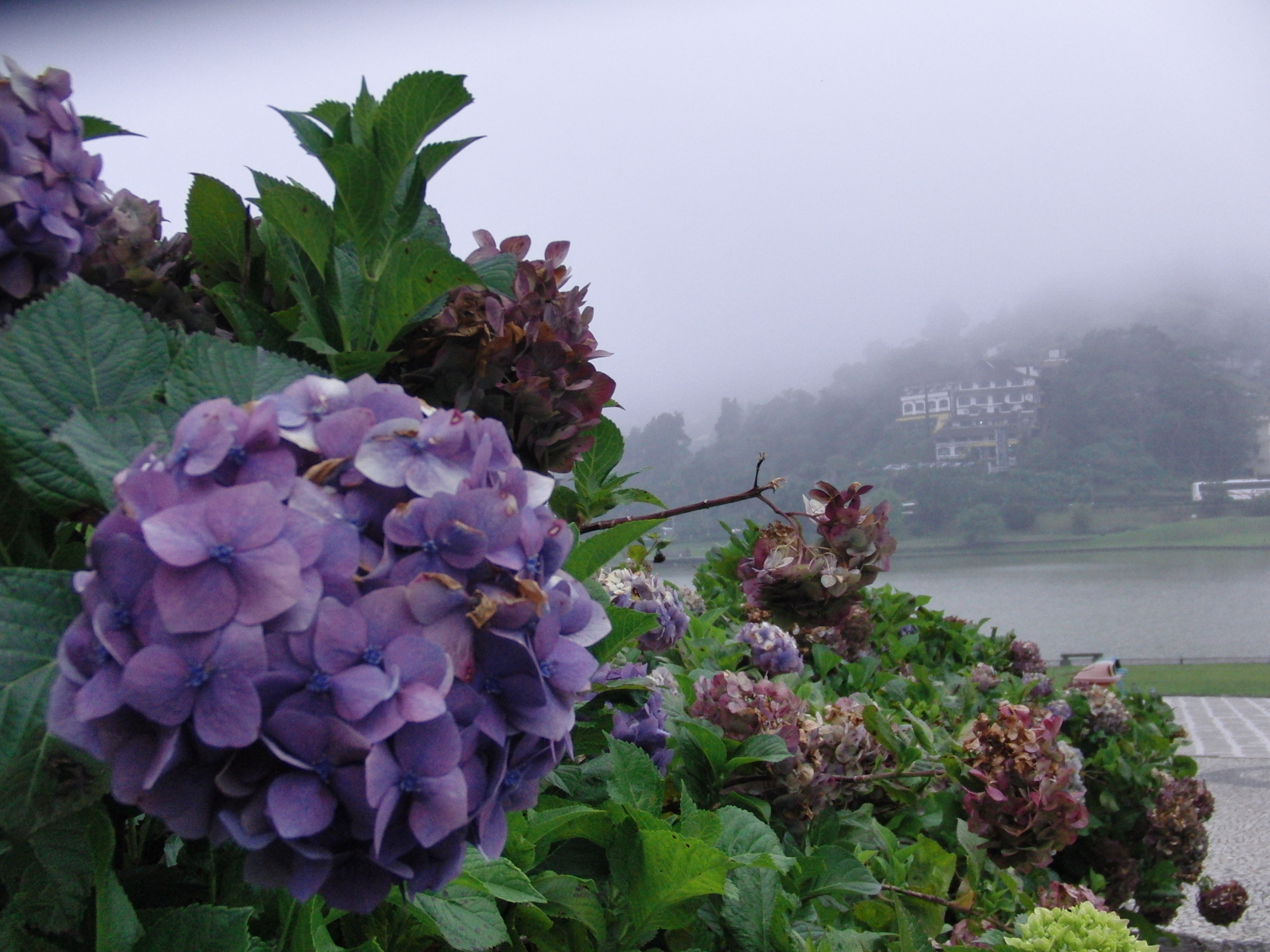
Hydrangea flowers in Petrópolis, Brazil

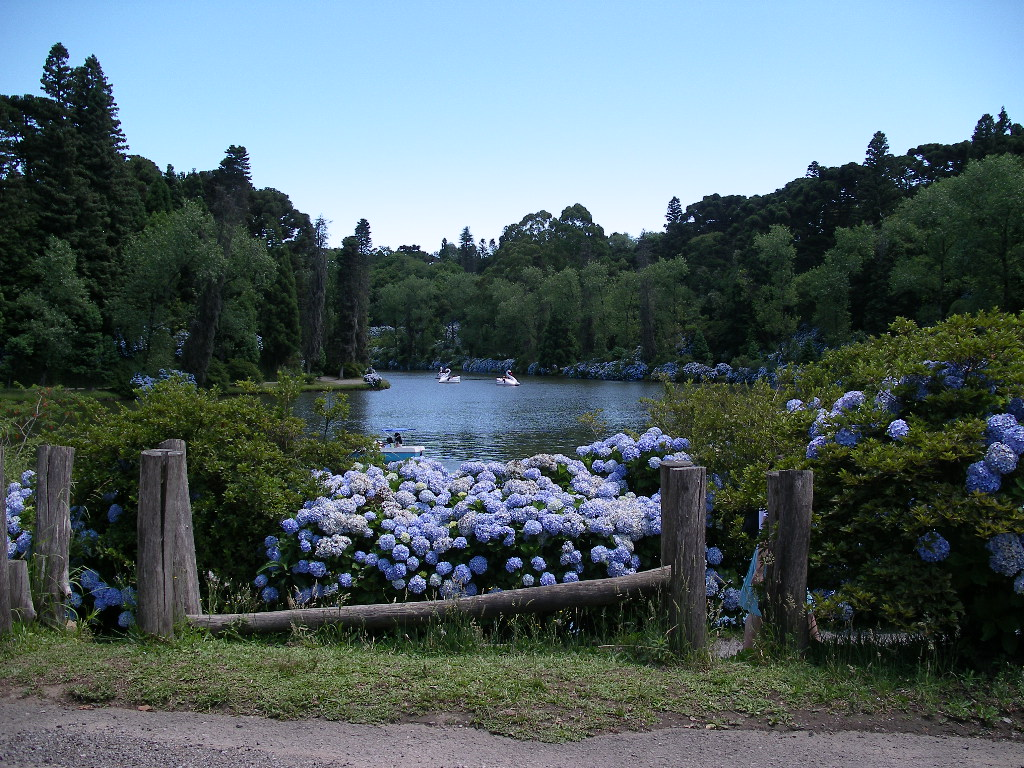
Hydrangeas near the Black Lake of Gramado, southern Brazil

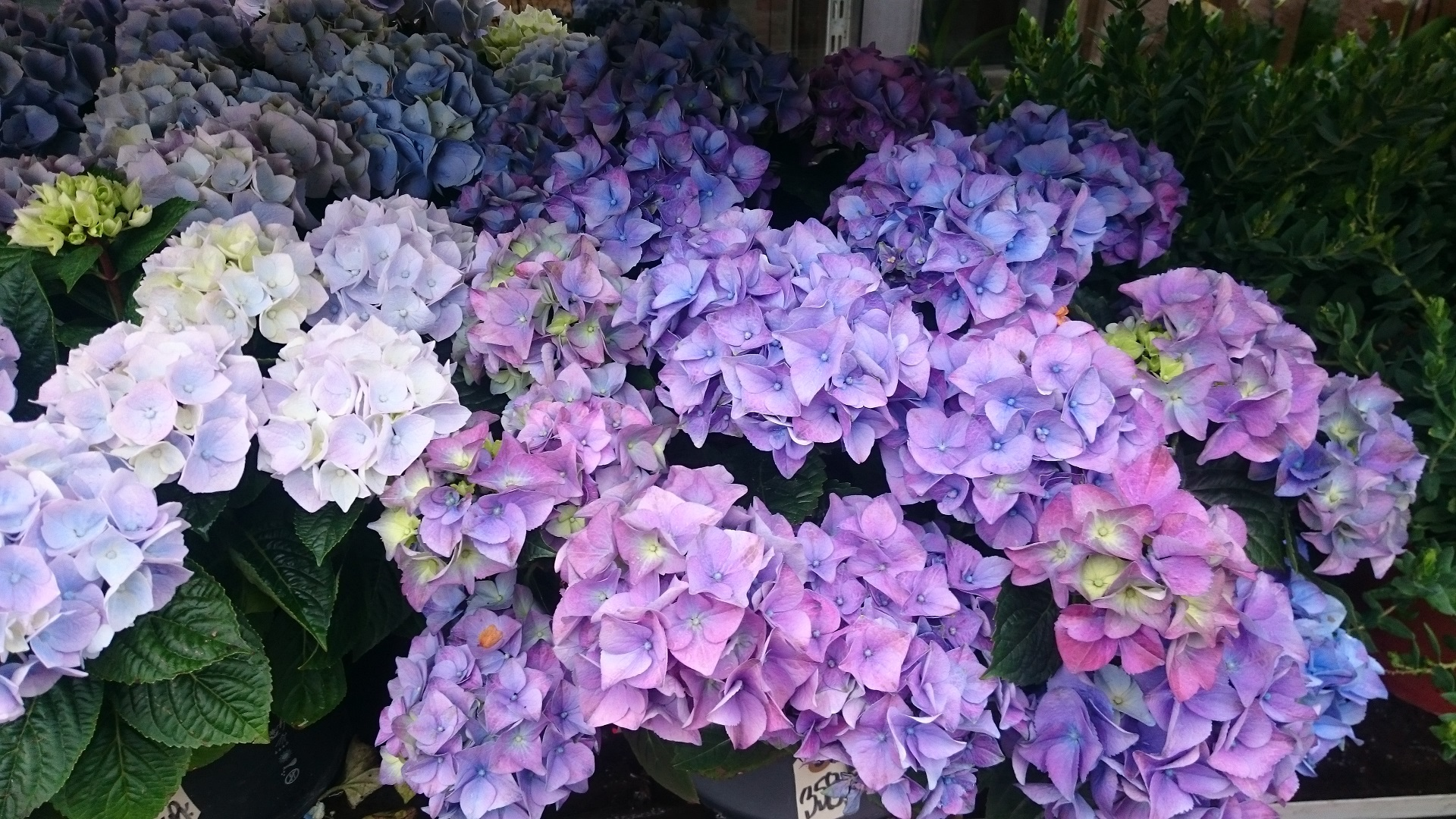
Purple hydrangea flowers

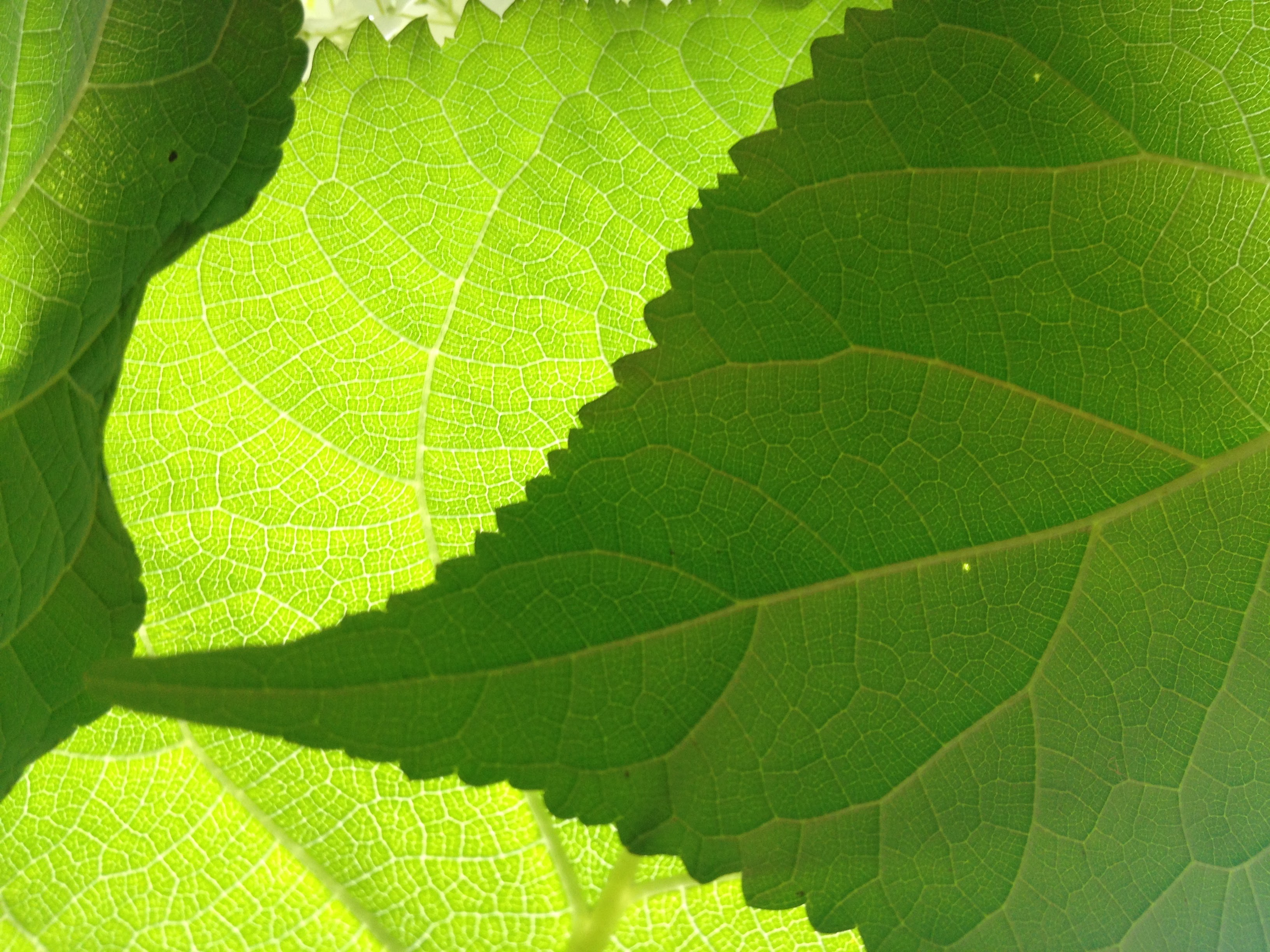
Hydrangea arborescens leaf

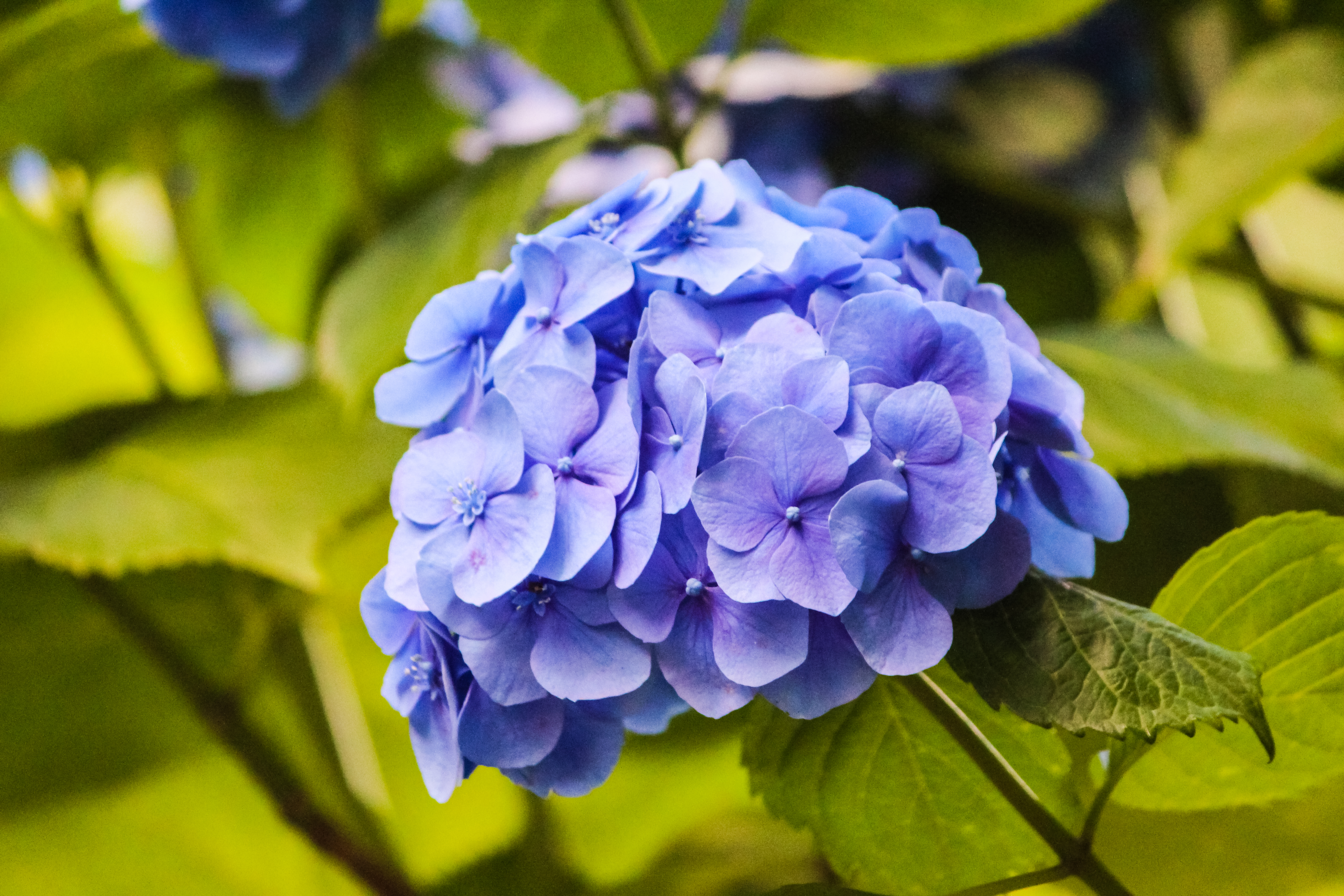

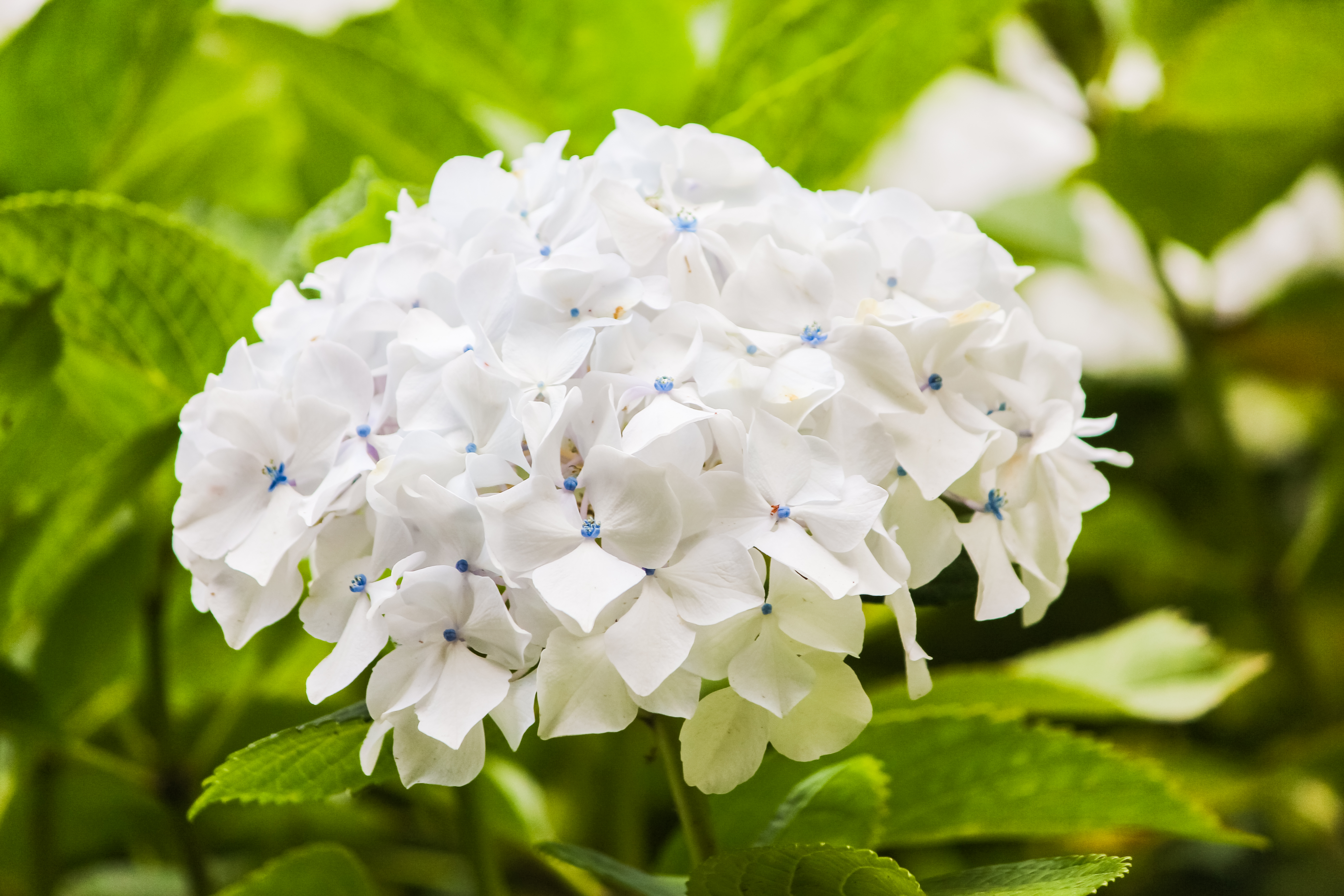

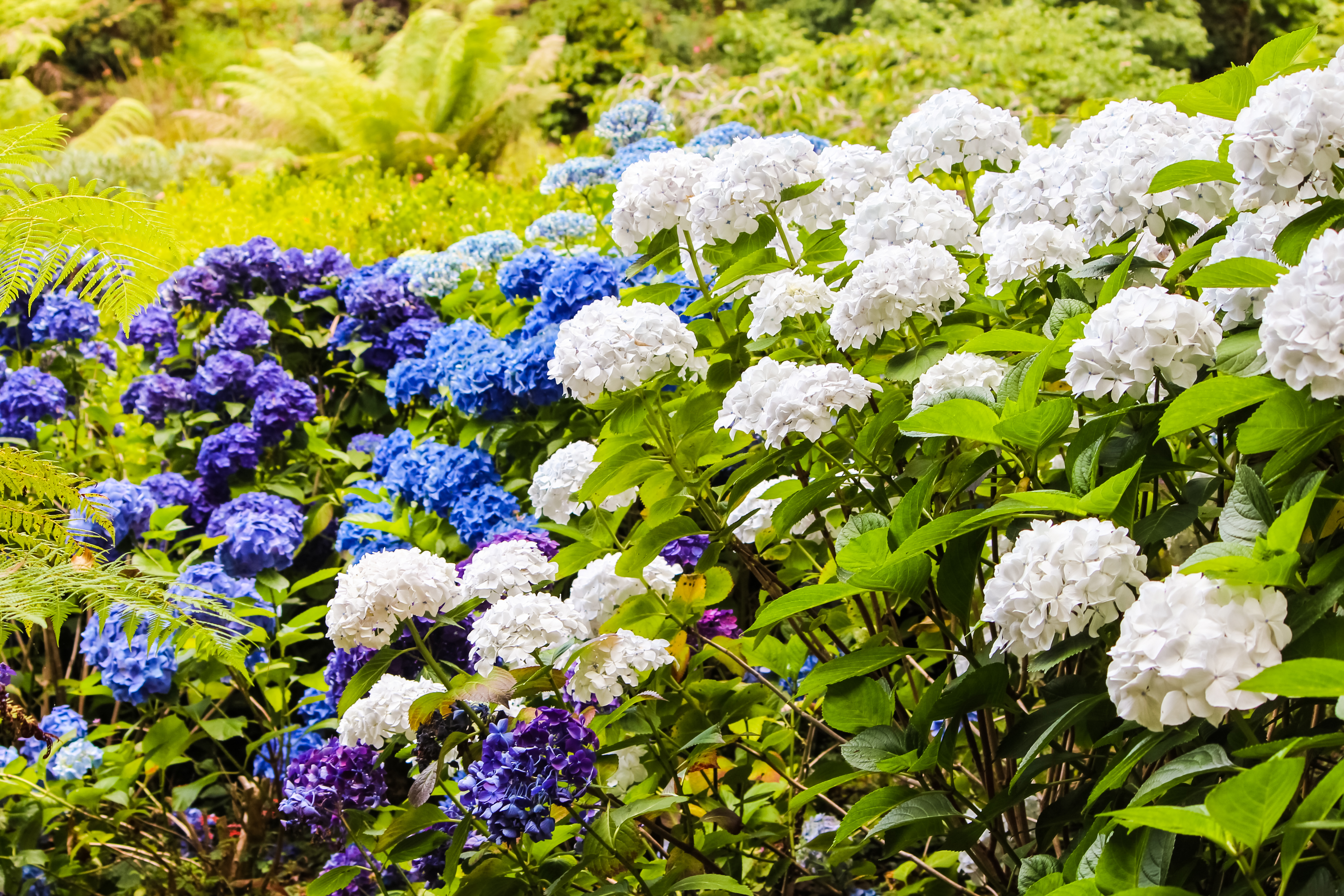

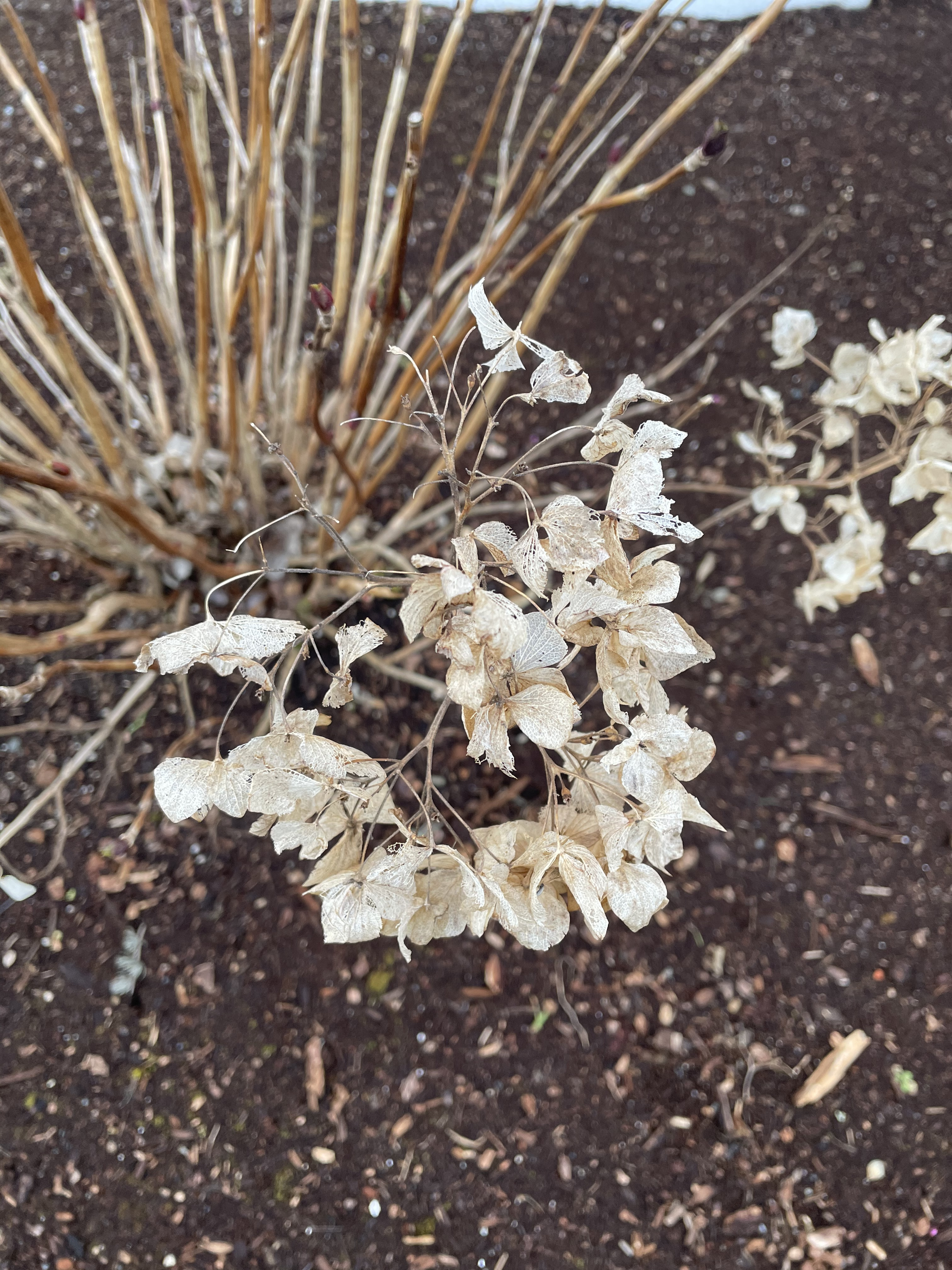

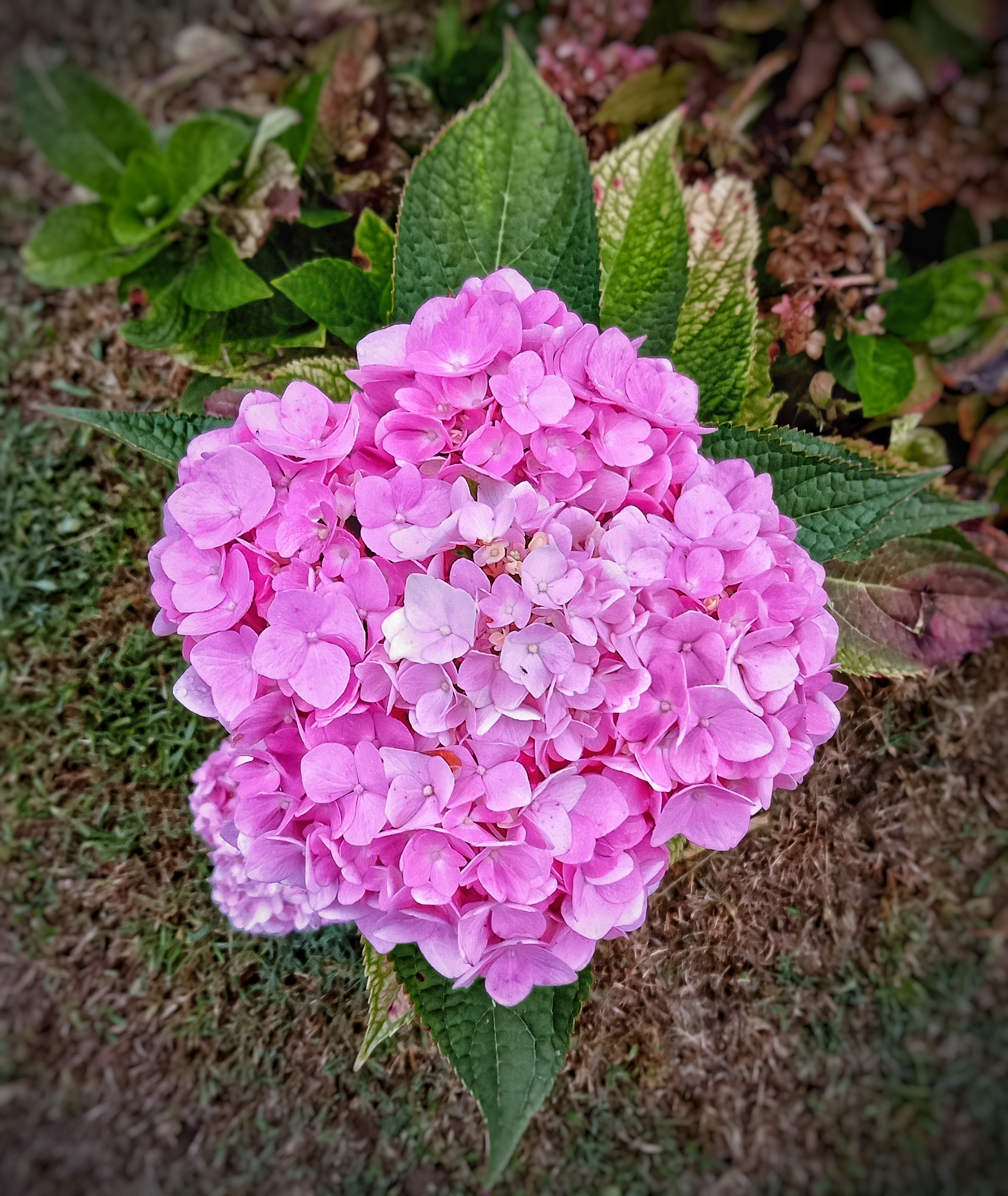
Flower of hydrangea

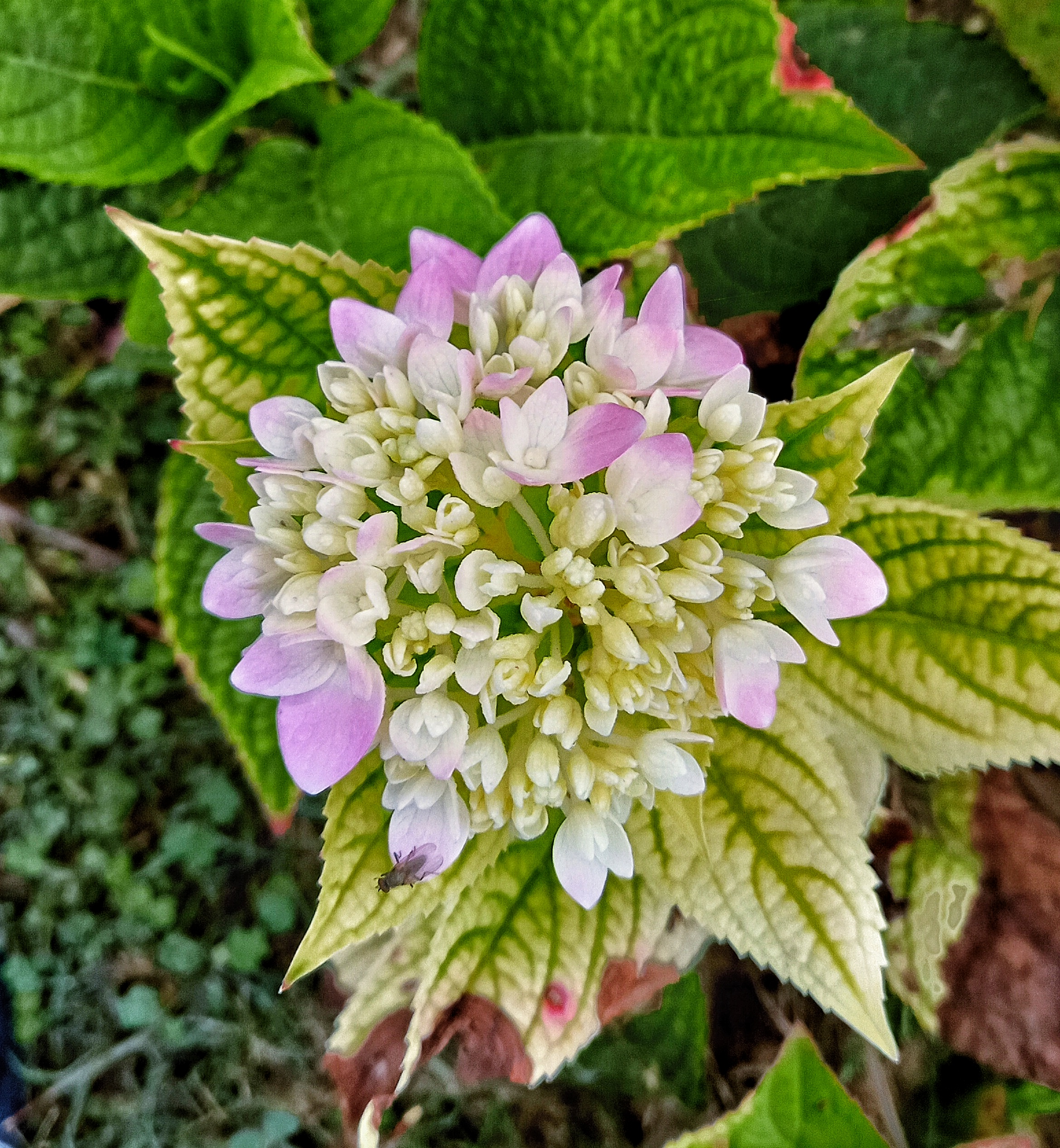
Flower of hydrangea

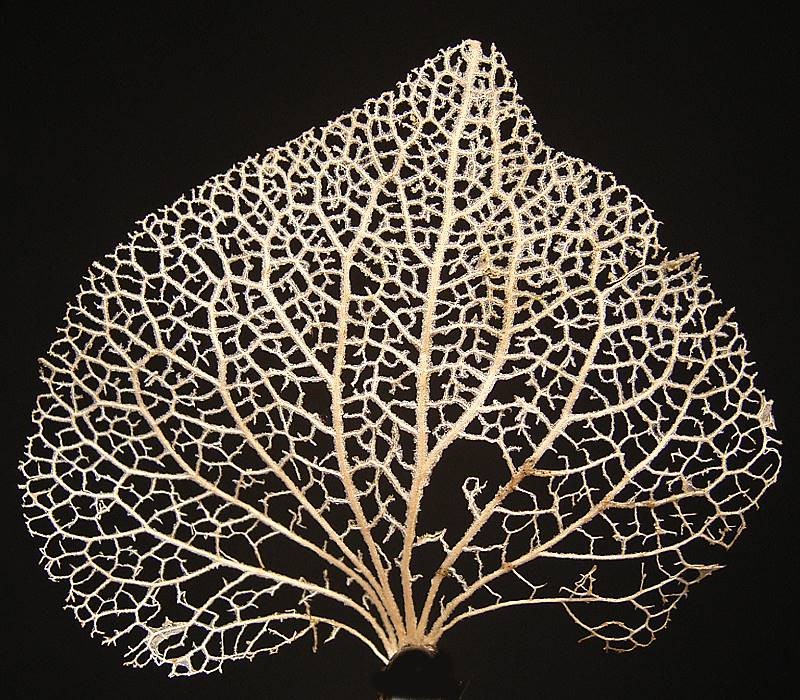
Vein structure of a hydrangea leaf

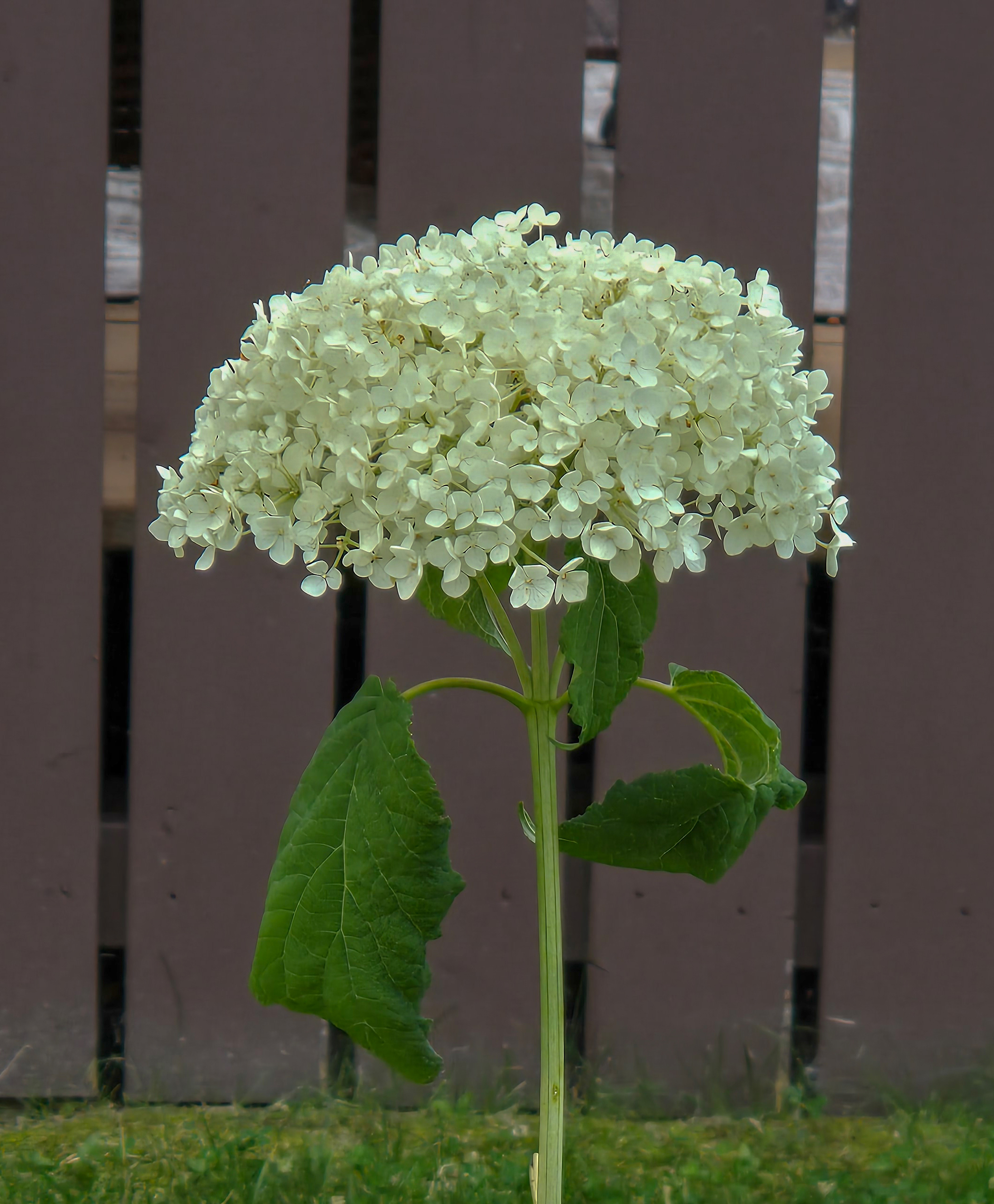
Hydrangea arborescens (smooth hydrangea) in Calgary, Canada
