= Hydrangea zhewanensis =

Scientific classification
- Kingdom: Plantae
- Clade: Tracheophytes
- Clade: Angiosperms
- Clade: Eudicots
- Clade: Asterids
- Order: Cornales
- Family: Hydrangeaceae
- Genus: Hydrangea
- Species: H. zhewanensis

Binomial name
- Hydrangea zhewanensis P.S.Hsu & X.P.Zhang

Species of flowering plant

Hydrangea zhewanensis is a species of flowering plant in the family Hydrangeaceae, native to China.

== Description ==
Hydrangea zhewanensis is a small shrub, which may be deciduous or evergreen, growing up to 0.7–1.5 m (2 ft 4 in – 4 ft 11 in) in height. Branchlets are brownish, densely pubescent when young. Bark peels off into fragments. Flowers are blue, oblong-ovate, 2.5–3 mm. Flowers grow in clusters, usually comprising small, fertile and also more showy sterile flowers. Seed capsules are oblong-ovoid, measuring about 3 mm in diameter. Seeds are brown, ellipsoid to oblong, compressed, measuring 0.5–0.7 mm, shortly winged at both ends.

Flowers June to July, fruits October to November.

== Habitat ==
Sparse forests or thickets along stream banks in valleys or on mountain slopes, from 600 to 1,500 m (2,000 to 4,900 ft).
