= Hydrangea robusta =

Scientific classification
- Kingdom: Plantae
- Clade: Tracheophytes
- Clade: Angiosperms
- Clade: Eudicots
- Clade: Asterids
- Order: Cornales
- Family: Hydrangeaceae
- Genus: Hydrangea
- Species: H. robusta

Binomial name
- Hydrangea robusta Hook.f. & Thomson

Species of flowering plant

Hydrangea robusta is a species of flowering plant in the family Hydrangeaceae, native to China and the Himalayas.
