= Hydrangea lingii =

Scientific classification
- Kingdom: Plantae
- Clade: Tracheophytes
- Clade: Angiosperms
- Clade: Eudicots
- Clade: Asterids
- Order: Cornales
- Family: Hydrangeaceae
- Genus: Hydrangea
- Species: H. lingii

Binomial name
- Hydrangea lingii G.Hoo

Synonyms
- Dichroa tristyla W.T.Wang & M.X.Nie; Hydrangea minnanica W.D.Han; Hydrangea vinicolor Chun

Species of flowering plant

Hydrangea lingii is a species of flowering plant in the family Hydrangeaceae. It is a shrub native to south-central and southeastern China.
