= Hydrangea mangshanensis =

Scientific classification
- Kingdom: Plantae
- Clade: Tracheophytes
- Clade: Angiosperms
- Clade: Eudicots
- Clade: Asterids
- Order: Cornales
- Family: Hydrangeaceae
- Genus: Hydrangea
- Species: H. mangshanensis

Binomial name
- Hydrangea mangshanensis C.F.Wei

Species of flowering plant

Hydrangea mangshanensis is a species of flowering plant in the family Hydrangeaceae, native to China. It can grow up to 3 feet (0.91 metres) tall. It grows on mountain slopes, trailsides and valleys.
