= Hydrangea macrocarpa =

Scientific classification
- Kingdom: Plantae
- Clade: Tracheophytes
- Clade: Angiosperms
- Clade: Eudicots
- Clade: Asterids
- Order: Cornales
- Family: Hydrangeaceae
- Genus: Hydrangea
- Species: H. macrocarpa

Binomial name
- Hydrangea macrocarpa Hand.-Mazz.

Species of flowering plant

Hydrangea macrocarpa (common name, mophead hydrangea) is a species of flowering plant in the family Hydrangeaceae, native to China.
