= Hydrangea davidii =

Scientific classification
- Kingdom: Plantae
- Clade: Tracheophytes
- Clade: Angiosperms
- Clade: Eudicots
- Clade: Asterids
- Order: Cornales
- Family: Hydrangeaceae
- Genus: Hydrangea
- Species: H. davidii

Binomial name
- Hydrangea davidii Franch.

Species of flowering plant

Hydrangea davidii is a species of flowering plant in the family Hydrangeaceae, native to China. It is a shrub that grows 1–3 m (3.3–9.8 ft) tall. Its habitats include mountain slopes, valleys and mixed forests.
