= Hydrangea kwangsiensis =

Scientific classification
- Kingdom: Plantae
- Clade: Tracheophytes
- Clade: Angiosperms
- Clade: Eudicots
- Clade: Asterids
- Order: Cornales
- Family: Hydrangeaceae
- Genus: Hydrangea
- Species: H. kwangsiensis

Binomial name
- Hydrangea kwangsiensis Hu

Species of flowering plant

Hydrangea kwangsiensis is a species of Hydrangea, native to China.
