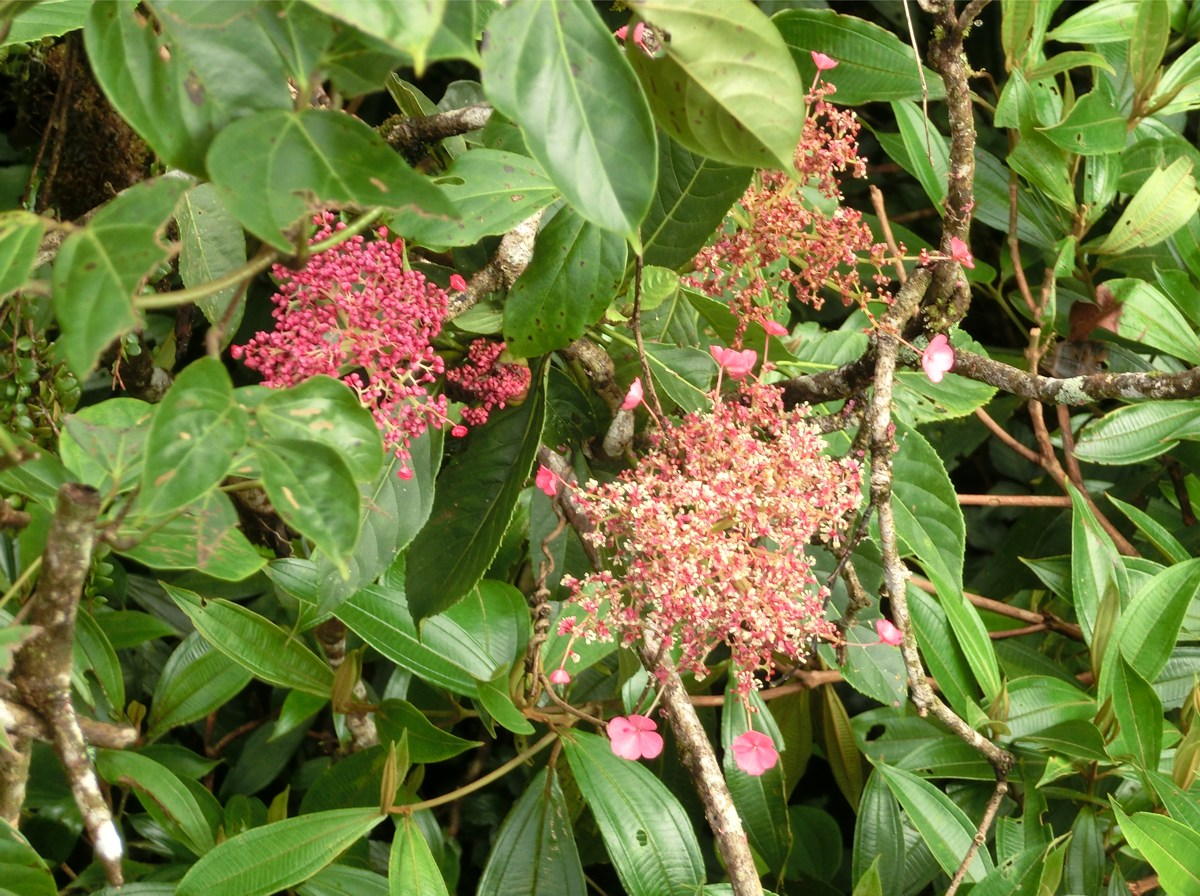
- Inflorescences

Scientific classification
- Kingdom: Plantae
- Clade: Tracheophytes
- Clade: Angiosperms
- Clade: Eudicots
- Clade: Asterids
- Order: Cornales
- Family: Hydrangeaceae
- Genus: Hydrangea
- Species: H. peruviana

Binomial name
- Hydrangea peruviana Moric.

Synonyms
- Cornidia peruviana (Moric. ex DC.) Small; Hydrangea caucana Engl.; Hydrangea durifolia Briq.; Hydrangea goudotii Briq.; Hydrangea lehmannii Engl.; Hydrangea oerstedii Briq.; Hydrangea panamensis Standl.; Hydrangea peruviana var. oerstedii (Briq.) Freire-Fierro; Hydrangea platyphylla Briq.; Hydrangea trianae Briq.; Hydrangea weberbaueri Engl.

= Hydrangea peruviana =

Species of flowering plant

Hydrangea peruviana is a species of shrub or woody climber in the flowering plant family Hydrangeaceae. It is native to Central America and South America.
