= Hydrangea xanthoneura =

Scientific classification
- Kingdom: Plantae
- Clade: Tracheophytes
- Clade: Angiosperms
- Clade: Eudicots
- Clade: Asterids
- Order: Cornales
- Family: Hydrangeaceae
- Genus: Hydrangea
- Species: H. xanthoneura

Binomial name
- Hydrangea xanthoneura Diels

Synonyms
- Hydrangea bretschneideri var. setchuenensis (Rehder) Rehder; Hydrangea pubinervis Rehder

Species of flowering plant

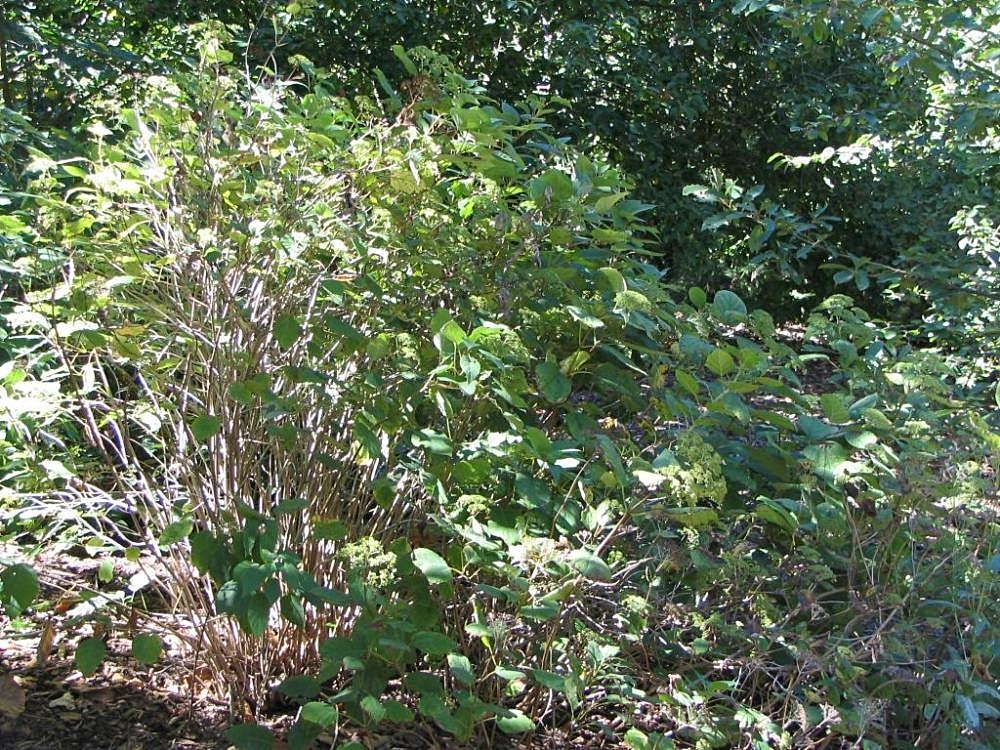

Hydrangea xanthoneura is a species of flowering plant in the family Hydrangeaceae, native to China.

== Description ==
The native range of H. xanthoneura is S. Central China to Myanmar. Shrubs or small trees reach a height of 1–7 m (3.3–23 ft). Flowers are white to greenish; seeds brown, winged at both ends. Flowers June-July, fruits September-October.
