= Hydrangea gracilis =

Scientific classification
- Kingdom: Plantae
- Clade: Tracheophytes
- Clade: Angiosperms
- Clade: Eudicots
- Clade: Asterids
- Order: Cornales
- Family: Hydrangeaceae
- Genus: Hydrangea
- Species: H. gracilis

Binomial name
- Hydrangea gracilis W.T.Wang & M.X.Nie

Species of flowering plant

Hydrangea gracilis is a species of flowering plant in the family Hydrangeaceae, native to China. It was formally described by W.T. Wang and M.X. Nie in 1981. It is a shrub that grows up to 1 metre (3.3 feet) tall.
