= Hydrangea jelskii =

Scientific classification
- Kingdom: Plantae
- Clade: Tracheophytes
- Clade: Angiosperms
- Clade: Eudicots
- Clade: Asterids
- Order: Cornales
- Family: Hydrangeaceae
- Genus: Hydrangea
- Species: H. jelskii

Binomial name
- Hydrangea jelskii Szyszył.

Species of flowering plant

Hydrangea jelskii is a species of shrub or woody climber in the flowering plant family Hydrangeaceae. It is native to South America.
