= Charles Maries =

English botanist and plant collector

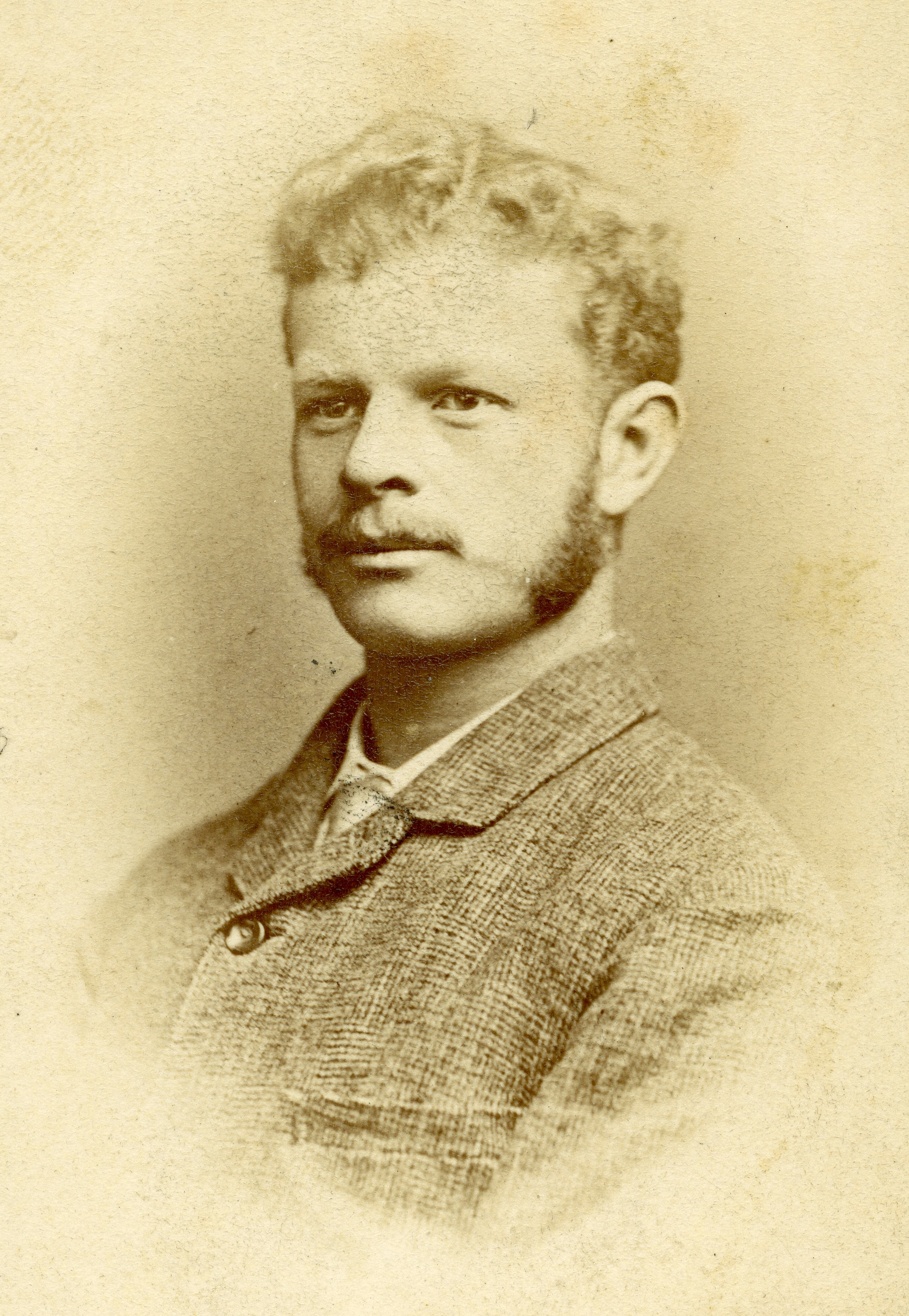
Charles Maries

Charles Maries (18 December 1851 – 11 October 1902) was an English botanist and plant collector who was sent by James Veitch & Sons of Chelsea, London to search for new hardy plants in Japan, China and Taiwan between 1877 and 1879; there he discovered over 500 new species, which Veitch introduced to England. Amongst his finds, several bear his name, including Abies mariesii, Davallia mariesii, Hydrangea macrophylla "Mariesii", Platycodon grandiflorus "Mariesii" and Viburnum plicatum "Mariesii".

== Early life ==
Maries was born in Hampton Lucy, Warwickshire, the youngest of five sons born to George and Mary Maries. His father was the boot- and shoe-maker for the village, as was his grandfather, Thomas Maries. He was educated at the Hampton Lucy Grammar School, where he learnt about plants from the Reverend George Henslow, who was headmaster between 1861 and 1865. Reverend Henslow went on to become the Royal Horticultural Society's Professor of Botany.

Of his brothers, Frederick (the eldest brother) and George followed their father and became cordwainers and shoe-makers, while Henry became a music teacher at Stratford-upon-Avon. The fourth brother, Richard, also had a strong interest in plants and he set up as a florist and nurseryman in Lytham, Lancashire. When their father died in 1869, Charles moved to Lytham to work at Richard's nursery.

== James Veitch & Sons ==
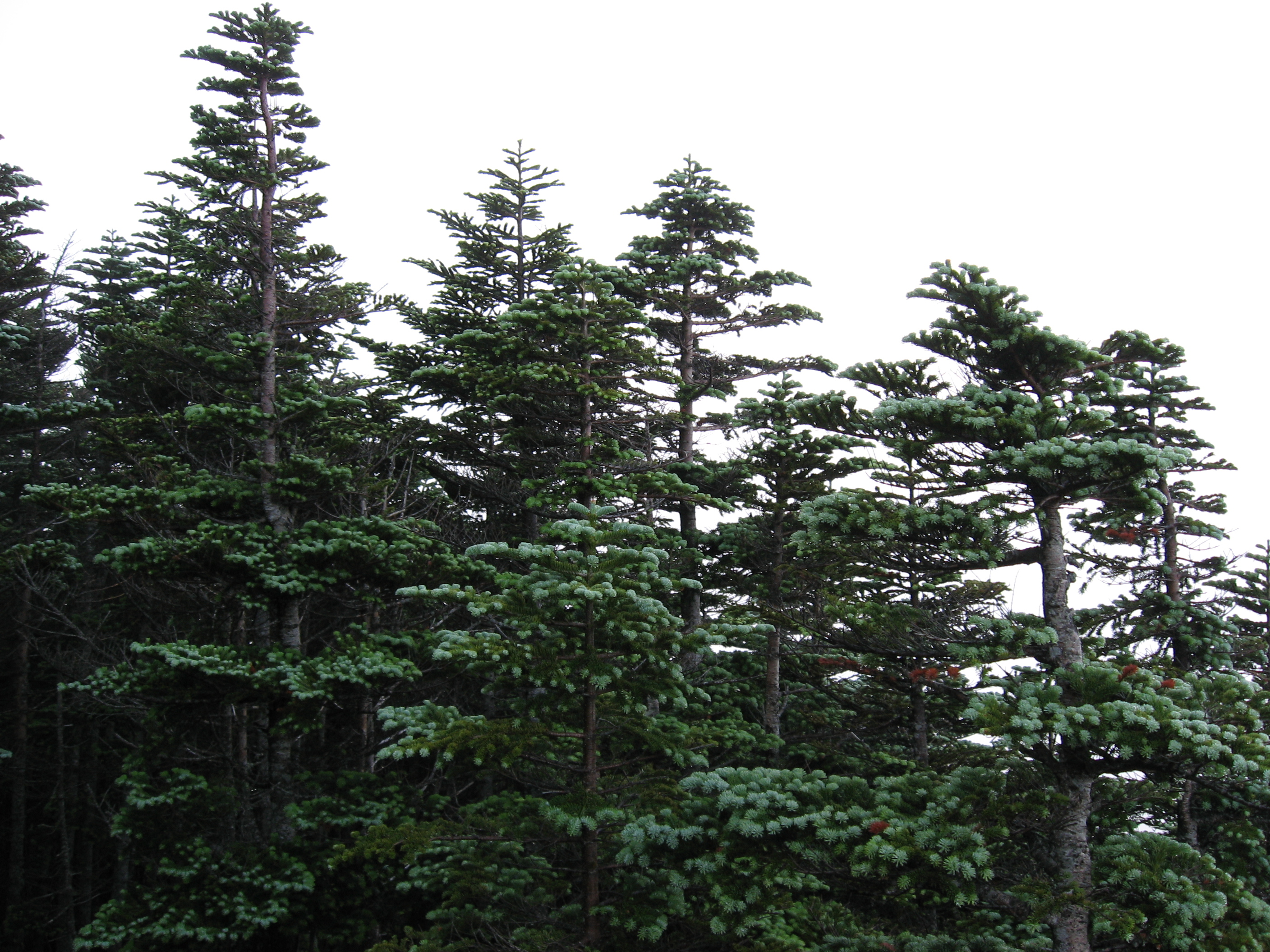
Abies mariesii

After seven years working with Richard, Charles joined James Veitch & Sons of Chelsea, London in 1876, then one of the largest nurseries in Britain. According to "Hortus Veitchii", "he proved to be an industrious and steady workman" and he was soon promoted to foreman. His knowledge of Japanese and Chinese plants led to him being invited by Harry Veitch to "undertake an exploring expedition to the Far East, the object of which was to obtain seeds of the coniferous trees of Japan, and to explore the great Yangtze valley of China".

He left for Shanghai on 1 February 1877, calling at Hong Kong and Ningbo (where he visited the mountains previously explored by Robert Fortune) en route and then went on to Japan, arriving at Nagasaki on 20 April. After visiting local gardens, he left Nagasaki, for Shimonoseki, and then, by way of the Inland Sea, Osaka and Kyoto, reached Yokohama, where he visited the nurseries of which Fortune had written in such glowing terms, although Maries was disappointed with what he saw.

From Yokohama and Tokyo, Maries proceeded overland to Nikkō and thence to Aomori, the northernmost port of the main island. According to the account in "Hortus Veitchii", whilst waiting at Aomori for a steamer to convey him to Hakodate on the island of Hokkaidō:

Maries noticed a conifer new to him growing in a garden, and learnt that it could be found in quantity on a neighbouring mountain. He went in search, and had reached a height of 3,500 ft., when it became obvious that the bamboo scrub formed an impassable barrier on that side of the mountain, and he reluctantly had to turn back, although the object of his search could plainly be seen. The following day he again made the ascent, but this time from the north side, and he succeeded in procuring cones of a new species, since named by Maxwell T. Masters, Abies mariesii.

Nearby, Maries also re-discovered Abies sachalinensis, which had previously been identified by Carl Friedrich Schmidt, a German botanical traveller, on the Russian island of Sakhalin in 1866, but had not been introduced to Europe.

Maries crossed to Hakodate on 20 June 1877 where he collected seeds of the beautiful Azalea rollisoni (Rhododendron indicum balsaminseflorum) which he dispatched to the Veitch Nurseries at Chelsea. He also sent back Styrax obassia, which was common on the volcanic slopes of the north island. Maries then continued to Sapporo; from the thickly wooded and mountainous districts in the neighbourhood, Maries sent back to England seeds of Abies yessoensis and Daphniphyllum glaucescens, as well as many maples and climbers, including Schizophragma hydrangeoides and Actinidia kolomikta.

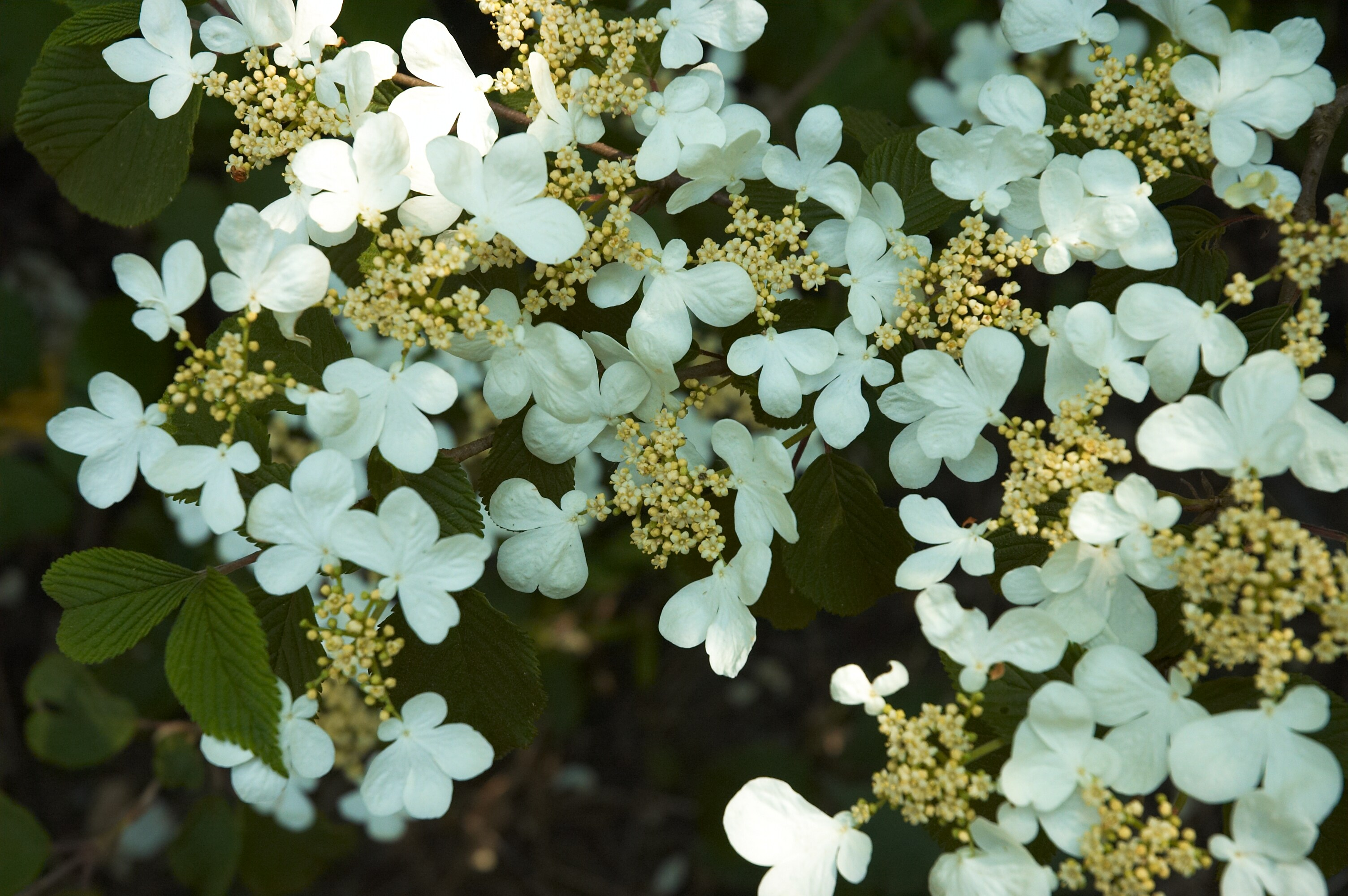
Viburnum plicatum "Mariesii"

From Sapporo he travelled by way of Chitose and Yūbetsu, visiting Urakawa and Samani. Near Samani, he discovered the pretty little Dracocephalum ruyschiana and obtained seed to send to Chelsea. Making Horoizumi, on Cape Erimo, his headquarters, Maries stayed in Hokkaidō from June to October 1877, exploring the mountains and making extensive entomological and botanical collections. Whilst exploring the forests of Hokkaido and the Hidaka Mountains, he discovered Platycodon grandiflorus and Acer nikoense.

Prior to his departure, he arranged for his collection to be taken by boat to Hakodate, to be sent on to England. The boat was laden with seaweed, which caused the ship to run aground; the box containing the seeds was transferred to another boat, which capsized and sank and the seed collection was lost. Fortunately, Maries had sufficient time to retrace his tracks and he managed to replace most of the missing seeds, which were successfully dispatched to London.

He left Hokkaidō on board the H.M.S. Modeste, arriving at Niigata, on the western coast of the main island, in December 1877, and travelled overland to Yokohama. On Christmas Day 1877, Maries left Yokohama for Hong Kong, arriving on 2 January 1878, and sailed a few days later for the island of Formosa (now Taiwan). He found penetrating the interior of the island difficult, and was only able to find a small amount of material, including seed of a new species of Lilium.

Maries then returned to Shanghai, on mainland China, from where, in the spring of 1878, he visited Zhenjiang, Jiujiang and nearby Mount Lushan, where he discovered a white form of Daphne genkwa as well as Hamamelis mollis, Pseudolarix amabilis, Rhododendron fortunei and Loropetalum chinense. In the Lushan Mountains, Maries visited the Temple of Teen Cha where he saw magnificent trees of Larix kaempferi, Cryptomeria japonica and Liriodendron chinense, as well as Lilium lancifolium formosanum. On this trip Maries suffered severely from sunstroke and returned to the coast. Whilst in China, Maries re-discovered Acer davidii, which had been originally discovered by Père Armand David when there as a missionary.

After spending the summer of 1878 back in Japan, where he collected seeds of conifers, he returned to China in December, basing himself at Hankou on the Yangtze River. In the early spring of 1879, he set off for Yichang, 800 miles higher up the river. In the gorges of Yichang, Maries found Primula obconica, and sent seed to Chelsea. Because of his unwillingness to understand the Chinese and his unstable temperament, they made life so miserable for him it was necessary for him to leave. He incurred their enmity to such a degree that they destroyed virtually everything that he had collected. According to Hortus Veitchii, "he was not sufficiently gentle, and was often threatened and occasionally robbed of his baggage".

By the summer of 1879, he was back in Japan – on this trip seeds of many Japanese oaks were gathered and the beautiful dwarf bamboos, including the Square Bamboo, which he successfully introduced to England.

Maries returned to England in February 1880, when his herbarium was sent to the Royal Botanic Gardens, Kew and his collection of insects was accepted by the British Museum.

== India ==
Maries had left England before 1881 (his name does not appear in the 1881 census) to take up employment in India and in 1882, he was recommended by Sir Joseph Hooker to the post of Superintendent of the gardens of the Maharajah of Darbhanga, where he laid out the very extensive grounds which surround the palaces.

He subsequently entered the service of the Maharajah Scindia of Gwalior, and again laid out the palace gardens. He remained superintendent of both the palace gardens and the Gwalior State Gardens until his death on 11 October 1902.

While working in India, Maries became an expert on mangoes, studying the texture, flavour, colour, history and location of mangoes that grew both wild and in cultivation. He wrote and illustrated a manuscript entitled Cultivated Mangoes of India but it was never published and is now in the archive at the Royal Botanic Gardens, Kew.

== Honours ==
Amongst the many honours he obtained in his lifetime, he was elected Fellow of the Linnean Society in 1877, and in 1897 was one of the first sixty recipients of the Royal Horticultural Society's Victoria Medal of Honour. Other inaugural recipients were his childhood tutor, the Reverend George Henslow.

Hampton Lucy, where Maries was born, has created the "Charles Maries Trail" featuring samples of many of the plants he discovered and introduced to England. The trail was opened on 30 July 2005 by David Gray, Director of Horticulture, Education & Science for the Royal Horticultural Society.

== Family and personal life ==
On 19 November 1881, he married Martha Maria Kerr, whose sister, Mary Haworth Kerr, was his brother Richard's wife. Martha had been born in Lytham in 1850 and travelled out to India to join him. They were married at St John's Church, Calcutta and went on to have three children; Francis, Mildred and Jasper, all of whom were born in India. Charles died on 11 October 1902 from a kidney stone – Martha survived him and lived until March 1936, dying in Edmonton, London aged 85.

According to Hortus Veitchii, "Maries had enthusiasm, but lacked "staying" power: he was musical, much to the delight of the Japanese peasants, and doubtless this must often have helped the work: he was a skilled shot, as the bucks on the domains of the Maharajah Scindia learnt to their cost when Maries was living in the country of the Mahrattas."

== Plant introductions ==
Maries is credited with discovering over 500 new species which he introduced to England. Amongst these were:

- Abies mariesii
- Abies sachalinensis
- Abies veitchii

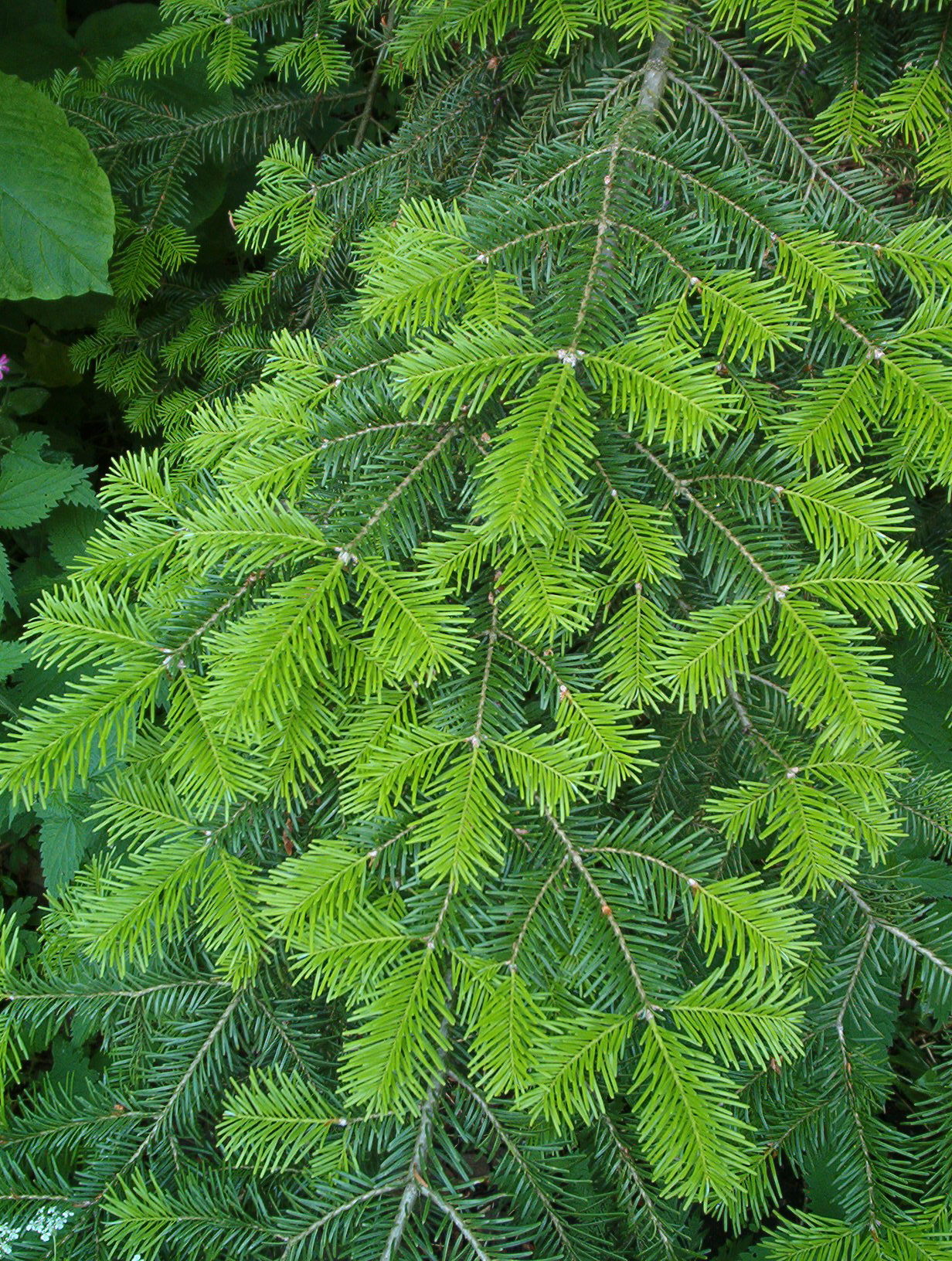
Abies veitchii

- Abies yessoensis
- Acer davidii
- Acer maximowiczianum
- Acer polymorphum
- Actinidia kolomikta
- Adiantum mariesii
- Chamaecyparis obtusa "Mariesii"
- Chimonobambusa quadrangularis (Square Bamboo)
- Conandron ramondioides
- Cryptomeria japonica
- Daphne genkwa
- Daphniphyllum glaucescens
- Davallia mariesii

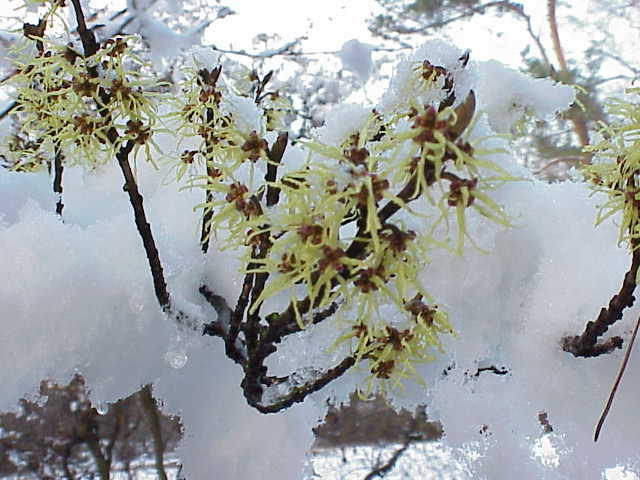
Hamamelis mollis

- Dimerium abietis "Mariesii"
- Dracocephalum ruyschiana
- Elaeagnus macrophylla
- Enkianthus campanulatus
- Exochorda grandiflora
- Fraxinus mariesii
- Hamamelis mollis
- Hydrangea macrophylla "Mariesii"
- Hydrangea rosea (several new and distinct forms)
- Ilex crenata "Mariesii"
- Iris kaempferi (many varieties)

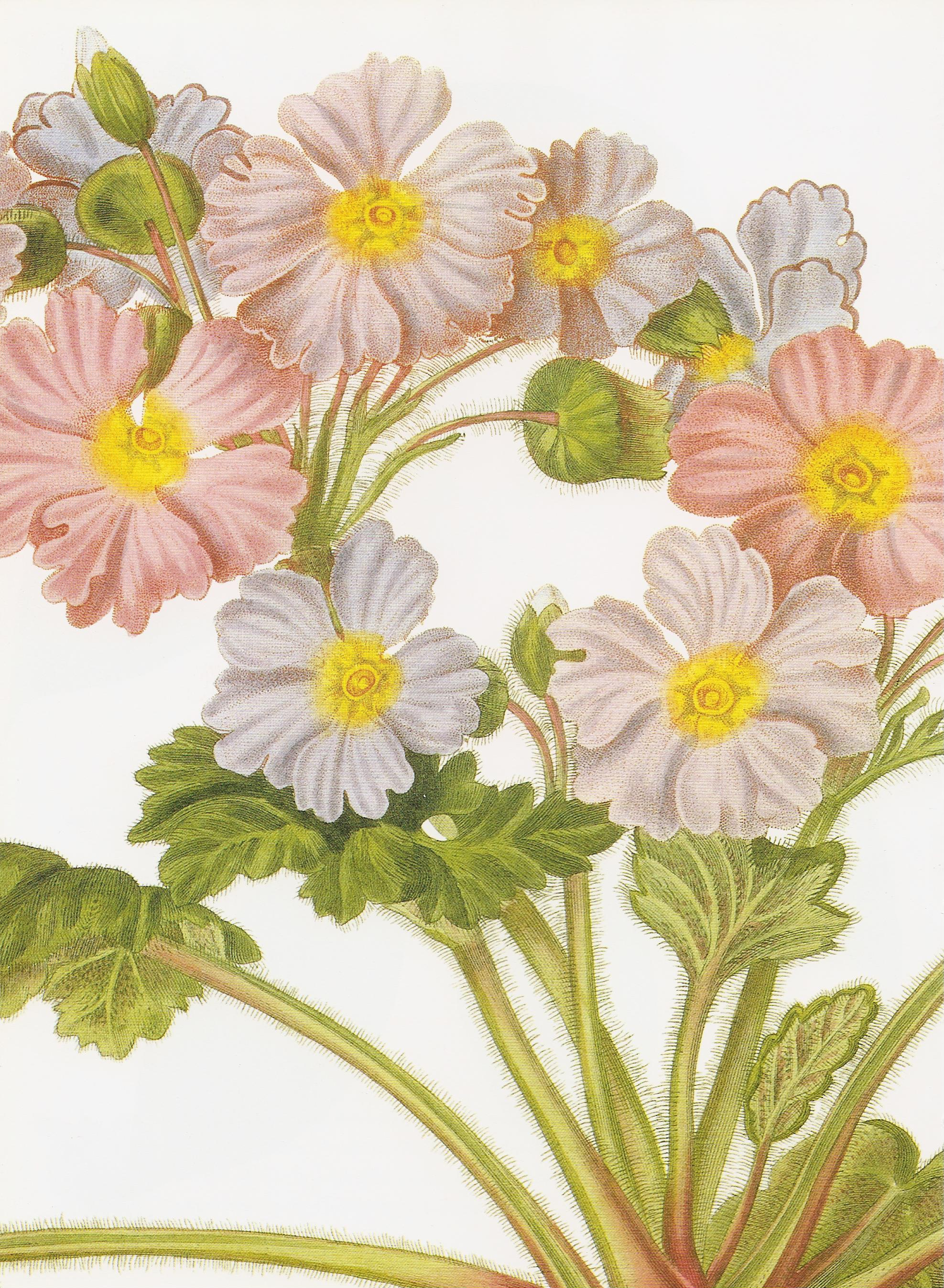
Primula sinensis

- Larix kaempferi
- Lilium auratum gloriosoides
- Lilium auratum platyphyllum
- Lilium lancifolium formosanum
- Lilium maculatum thunbergianum
- Liriodendron chinense
- Loropetalum chinense
- Magnolia sieboldii
- Magnolia stellata
- Osmunda japonica corymbifera
- Pinus chinensis
- Platycodon grandiflorus "Mariesii"
- Primula obconica
- Primula sinensis
- Pseudolarix amabilis
- Rhododendron fortunei
- Rhododendron indicum balsaminseflorum
- Rhododendron mariesii
- Schizophragma hydrangeoides
- Spiraea palmata alba
- Styrax obassia
- Viburnum plicatum "Mariesii"
