= L. chinense =

L. chinense may refer to:

- Liriodendron chinense, the Chinese tulip tree, a tree species native to Asia
- Loropetalum chinense, the Chinese fringe flower, a plant species
- Lycium chinense, a plant species
