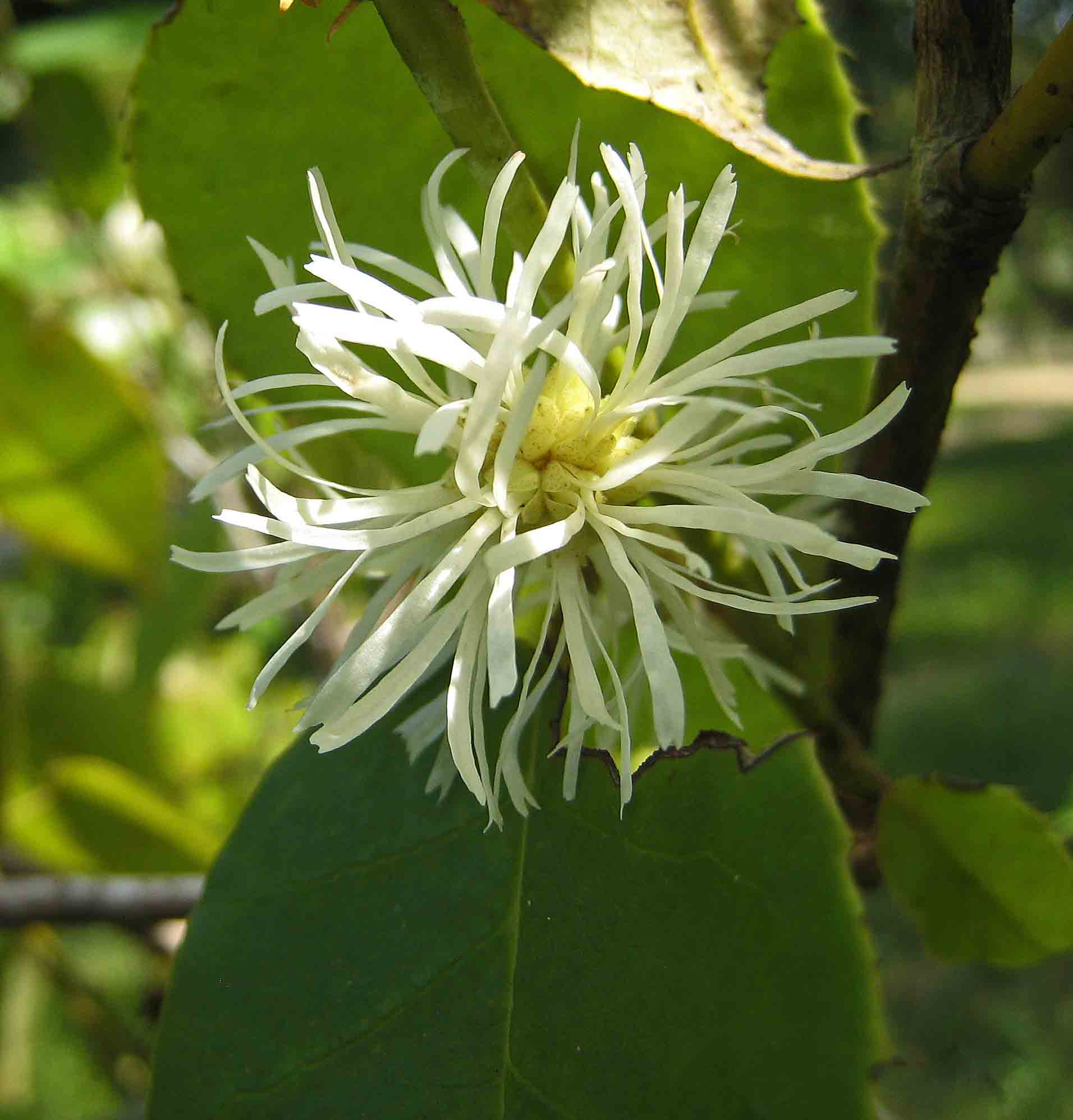

Conservation status
- Vulnerable (IUCN 2.3)

Scientific classification
- Kingdom: Plantae
- Clade: Embryophytes
- Clade: Tracheophytes
- Clade: Spermatophytes
- Clade: Angiosperms
- Clade: Eudicots
- Order: Saxifragales
- Family: Hamamelidaceae
- Genus: Loropetalum
- Species: L. subcordatum

Binomial name
- Loropetalum subcordatum Oliv.

Synonyms
- Tetrathyrium subcordatum Benth.

= Loropetalum subcordatum =

Species of flowering plant

Loropetalum subcordatum is a species of plant in the Hamamelidaceae family. It is found in China and Hong Kong. Previously considered a separate genus, Tetrathyrium, Loropetalum subcordatum is one of four species of Loropetalum, and is placed in tribe Loropetaleae, subfamily Hamamelidoideae, family Hamamelidaceae of the Saxifragales. Its conservation status is considered vulnerable.

== Bibliography ==
- Averyanov, Leonid V.; Endress, Peter K.; Nguyen, Khang Sinh; Thai, Tran Huy; Maisak, Tatiana V.; Averyanova, Anna L.; Diep, Le Ngoc (28 December 2018). "Loropetalum flavum (Hamamelidaceae), a new species from northern Vietnam". Phytotaxa. 385 (2): 94. doi:10.11646/phytotaxa.385.2.5.
- Li, Jianhua; Bogle, A. Linn (2001). "A new suprageneric classification system of the Hamamelidoideae based on morphology and sequences of nuclear and chloroplast dna". Harvard Papers in Botany. 5 (2): 499–515. ISSN 1043-4534. JSTOR 41761618.
- World Conservation Monitoring Centre (1998). "Loropetalum subcordatum". IUCN Red List of Threatened Species. 1998 e.T32377A9701993. doi:10.2305/IUCN.UK.1998.RLTS.T32377A9701993.en.
