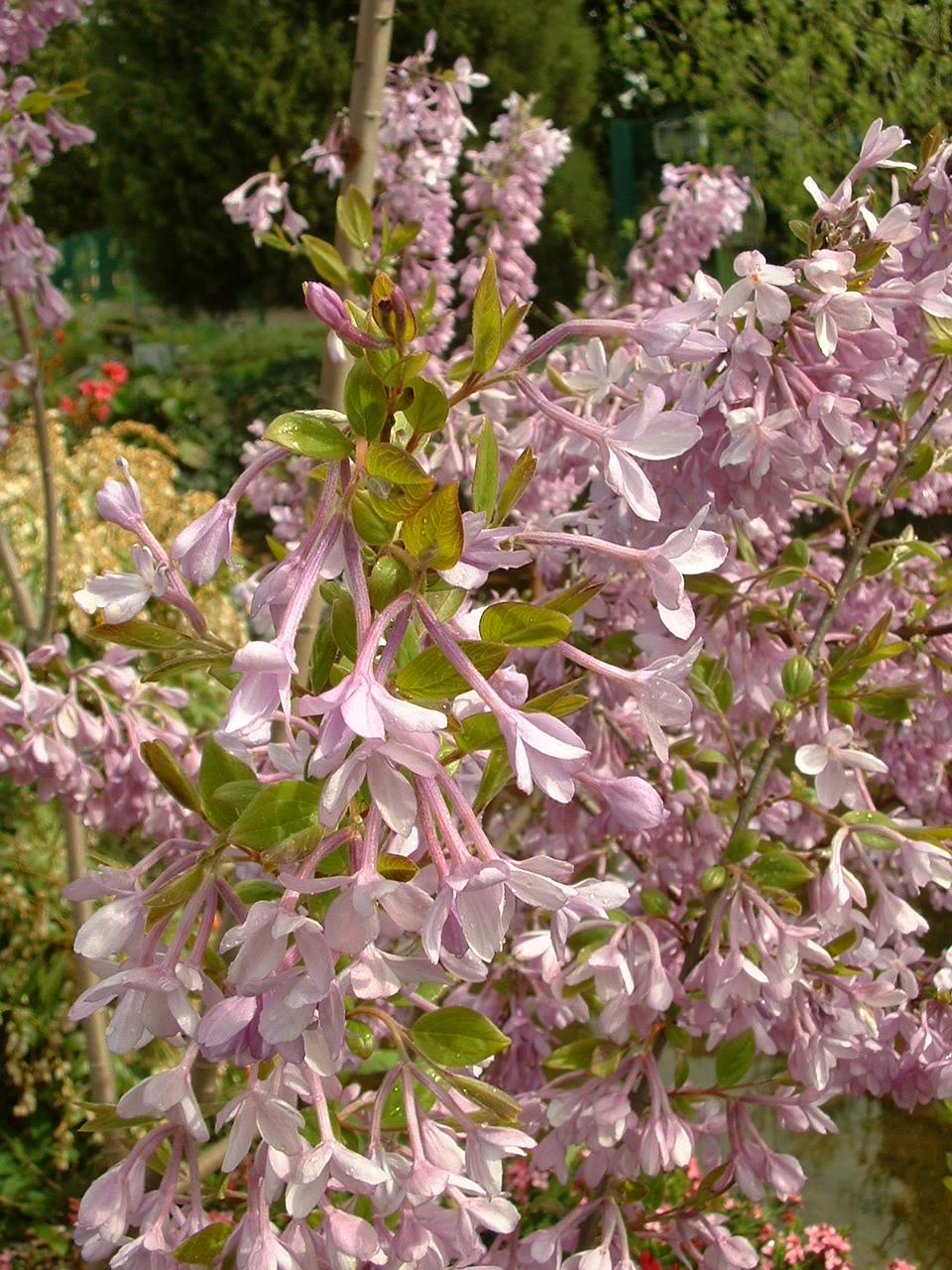

Scientific classification
- Kingdom: Plantae
- Clade: Tracheophytes
- Clade: Angiosperms
- Clade: Eudicots
- Clade: Rosids
- Order: Malvales
- Family: Thymelaeaceae
- Genus: Daphne
- Species: D. genkwa

Binomial name
- Daphne genkwa Siebold & Zucc.

Synonyms
- Daphne fortunei Lindl.; Daphne genkwa var. fortunei (Lindl.) Franch.; Daphne genkwa f. taitoensis Hamaya; Wikstroemia genkwa (Siebold & Zucc.) Domke

= Daphne genkwa =

Species of shrub

Daphne genkwa is a deciduous shrub and one of the 50 fundamental herbs used in traditional Chinese medicine, where it has the name yuán huā (Chinese: 芫花).

The plant was discovered by the prolific British plant collector Charles Maries (1851–1902).

== Distribution ==
Daphne genkwa occurs in China, Japan, Korea, and Vietnam.

== See also ==
- Chinese herbology#50 fundamental herbs
