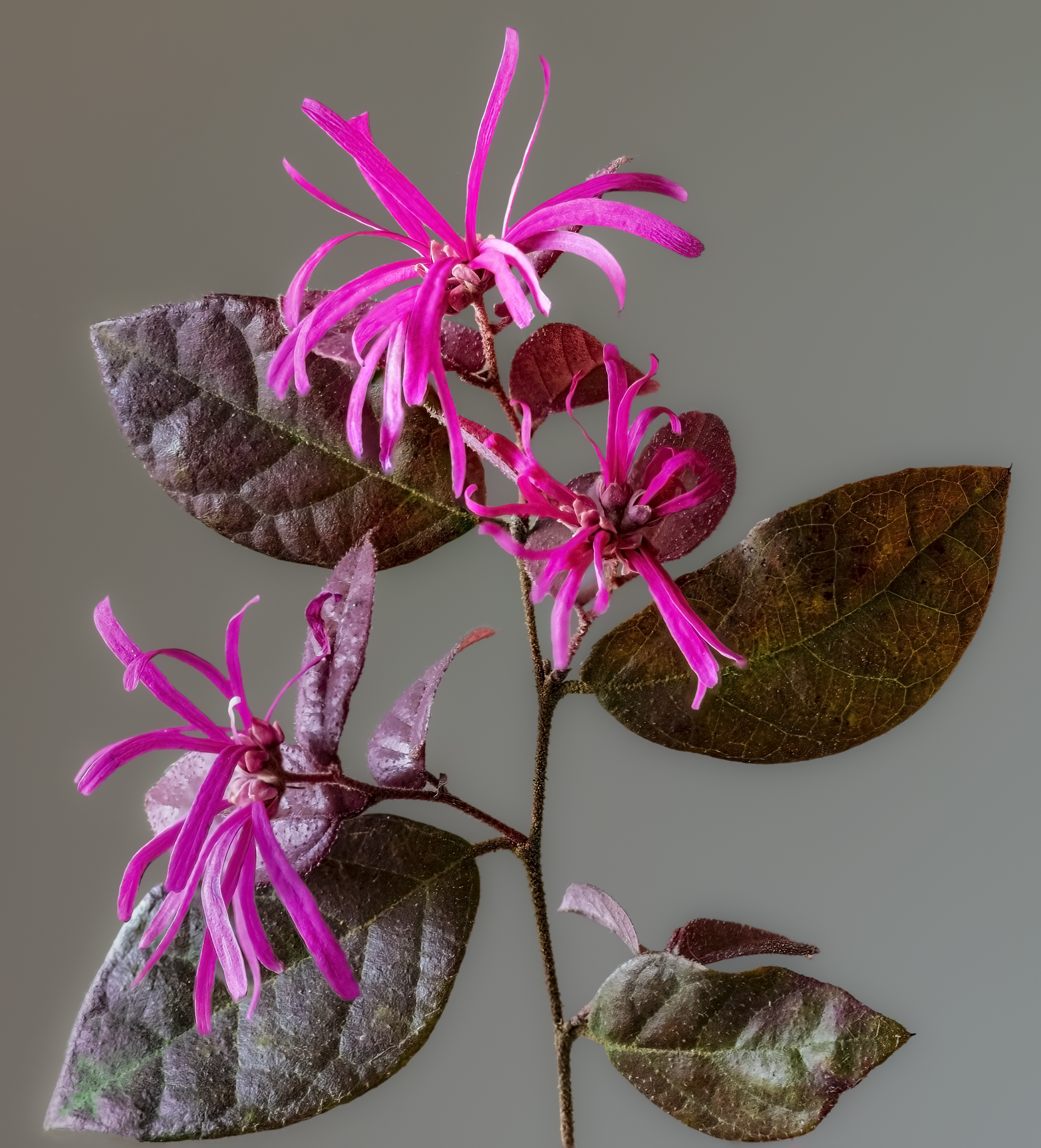
- Loropetalum chinense var. rubrum

Scientific classification
- Kingdom: Plantae
- Clade: Embryophytes
- Clade: Tracheophytes
- Clade: Spermatophytes
- Clade: Angiosperms
- Clade: Eudicots
- Order: Saxifragales
- Family: Hamamelidaceae
- Subfamily: Hamamelidoideae
- Tribe: Loropetaleae
- Genus: Loropetalum; R.Br. ex Rchb.

Type species
- Loropetalum chinense (R.Brown) Oliver

Species
- Loropetalum chinense (Benth.) Oliv.; Loropetalum flavum Aver., P.K. Endress & K.S. Nguyen, Loropetalum lanceum Handel-Mazzetti; Loropetalum subcordatum (Benth.) Oliv.

Synonyms
- Tetrathyrium Benth.

= Loropetalum =

Genus of flowering plants

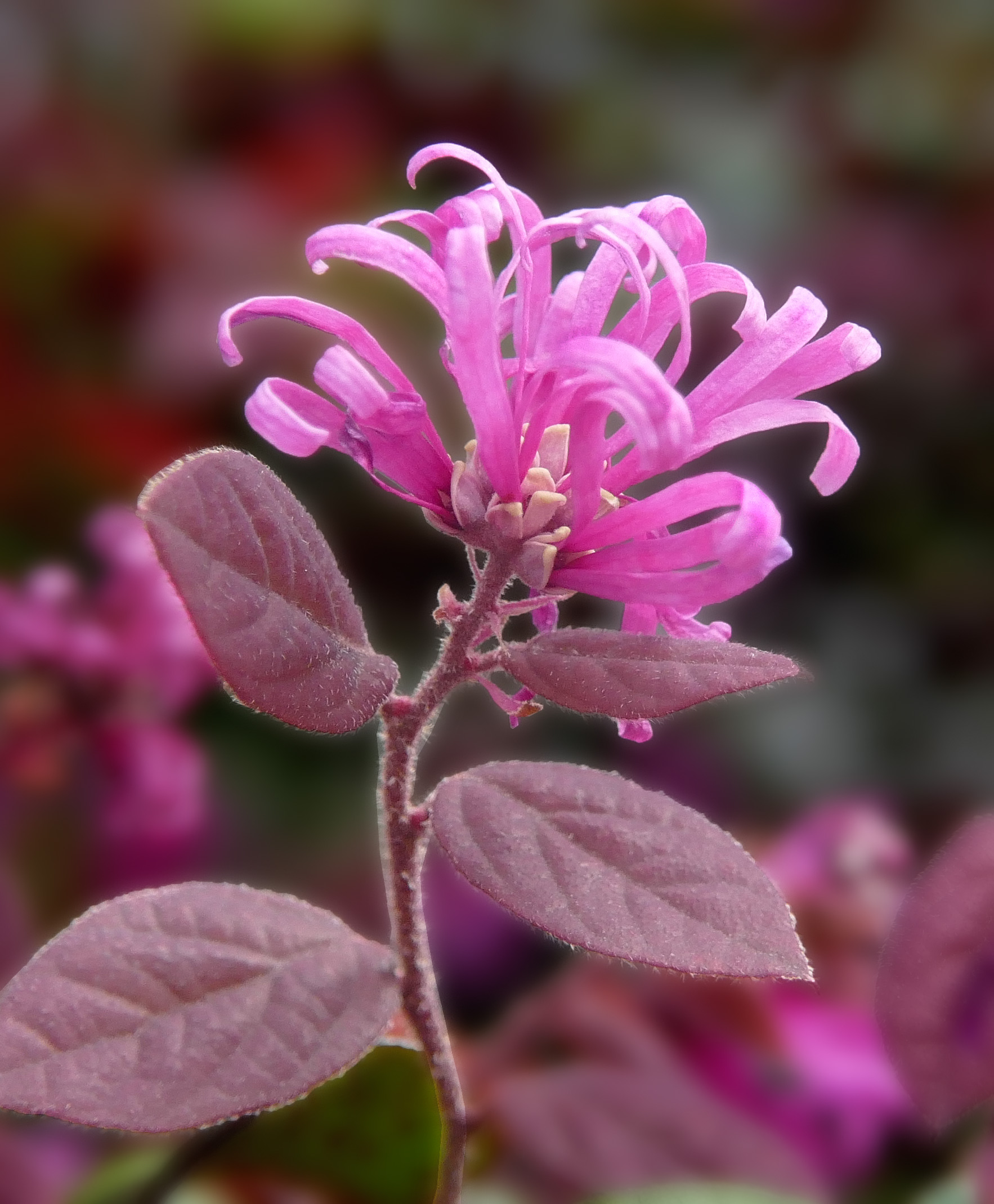
Loropetalum (may be a 'Crimson Fire' Loropetalum)

Loropetalum is a genus of four species of shrubs or small trees in the witch-hazel family, Hamamelidaceae, native to China, Japan, and south-eastern Asia.

== Description ==
Flowers are produced in clusters during spring and are similar to those of the closely related witch-hazel. Each flower consists of four to six (depending on species) slender strap shaped petals 1–2 cm long.

== Taxonomy ==
Loropetalum is placed in tribe Loropetaleae, subfamily Hamamelidoideae, family Hamamelidaceae of the Saxifragales.

=== Etymology ===
The name Loropetalum refers to the shape of the flowers and comes from the Greek loron meaning strap and petalon meaning petal.

=== Species ===
The species are:

- Loropetalum chinense – white-flowering variety up to 3.7 m (12 ft) tall, pink-flowering variety up to 1.5 m (4 ft 11 in) tall
- Loropetalum flavum – yellow flowers
- Loropetalum lanceum – up to 13 m (43 ft) tall, white flowers
- Loropetalum subcordatum – up to 12 m (39 ft) tall

== Bibliography ==
- Averyanov, Leonid V.; Endress, Peter K.; Nguyen, Khang Sinh; Thai, Tran Huy; Maisak, Tatiana V.; Averyanova, Anna L.; Diep, Le Ngoc (28 December 2018). "Loropetalum flavum (Hamamelidaceae), a new species from northern Vietnam". Phytotaxa. 385 (2): 94. doi:10.11646/phytotaxa.385.2.5. S2CID 92225639.
- Li, Jianhua; Bogle, A. Linn (2001). "A new suprageneric classification system of the Hamamelidoideae based on morphology and sequences of nuclear and chloroplast dna". Harvard Papers in Botany. 5 (2): 499–515. ISSN 1043-4534. JSTOR 41761618.
- Zhi-Yun Zhang; Hongda Zhang; Peter K. Endress (2004), "Loropetalum R. Brown in G. F. Abel, Narr. Journey China, App. B. 375. 1818", Flora of China
- San Marcos Growers: Loropetalum
