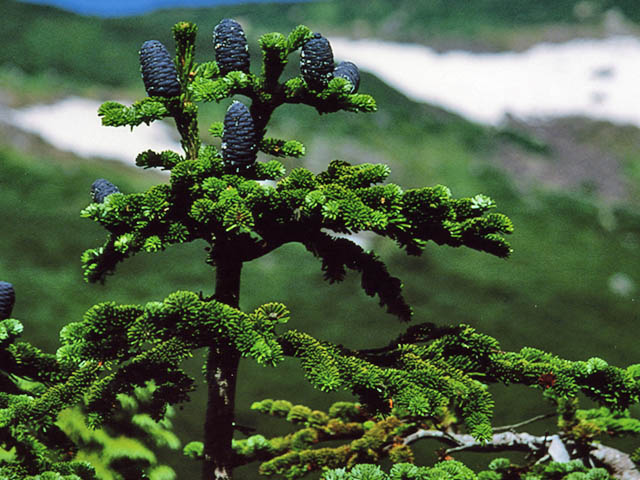

Conservation status
- Least Concern (IUCN 3.1)

Scientific classification
- Kingdom: Plantae
- Clade: Tracheophytes
- Clade: Gymnosperms
- Division: Pinophyta
- Class: Pinopsida
- Order: Pinales
- Family: Pinaceae
- Genus: Abies
- Species: A. mariesii

Binomial name
- Abies mariesii Mast.

Synonyms
- Homotypic Synonyms: Pinus mariesii (Mast.) Voss; Heterotypic Synonyms: Abies mariesii f. hayachinensis Hayashi

= Abies mariesii =

Maries' fir

Species of conifer

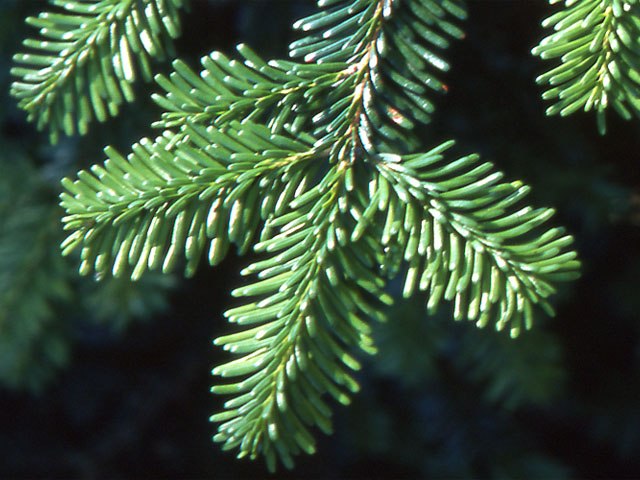
Maries' fir leaves

Abies mariesii, also known as Maries' fir and アオモリトドマツ (Aomori todomatsu), is a species of fir in the family Pinaceae. It is native to the mountains of central and northern Honshū, Japan. It grows at altitudes of 750–1,900 m in northern Honshū, and 1,800–2,900 m in central Honshū, always in temperate rain forest with high rainfall and cool, humid summers, and very heavy winter snowfall.

== Description ==
It is a medium-sized evergreen coniferous tree growing to 15–30 m tall with a trunk diameter of up to 0.8 m, smaller and sometimes shrubby at tree line. The leaves are needle-like, flattened, 1.5–2.5 cm long and 2 mm wide by 0.5 mm thick, matt dark green above, and with two white bands of stomata below, and slightly notched at the tip. The leaf arrangement is spiral on the shoot, but with each leaf variably twisted at the base so they lie flat to either side of and above the shoot, with none below the shoot. The shoots are orange-red with dense velvety pubescence. The cones are 5–11 cm long and 3–4 cm broad, dark purple-blue before maturity; the scale bracts are short, and hidden in the closed cone. The winged seeds are released when the cones disintegrate at maturity about 6–7 months after pollination.

Maries' fir is very closely related to Pacific silver fir A. amabilis from the Pacific coast of North America, which is distinguished by its slightly longer leaves (2–4.5 cm) and larger cones (9–17 cm long). The tree, which is locally known in the Tōhoku region as Aomori todomatsu was designated as the city tree of Aomori on 27 April 2005.

== Discovery ==
Maries' fir is named after the English plant collector Charles Maries (1851–1902), who introduced the species to Britain in 1879.

According to the account in "Hortus Veitchii", whilst waiting at Aomori on the main island (Honshū) for a steamer to convey him to Hakodate on the island of Hokkaido:

Maries noticed a conifer new to him growing in a garden, and learnt that it could be found in quantity on a neighbouring mountain. He went in search, and had reached a height of 3,500 ft., when it became obvious that the bamboo scrub formed an impassable barrier on that side of the mountain, and he reluctantly had to turn back, although the object of his search could plainly be seen. The following day he again made the ascent, but this time from the north side, and he succeeded in procuring cones of a new species, since named by Maxwell T. Masters, Abies mariesii.
