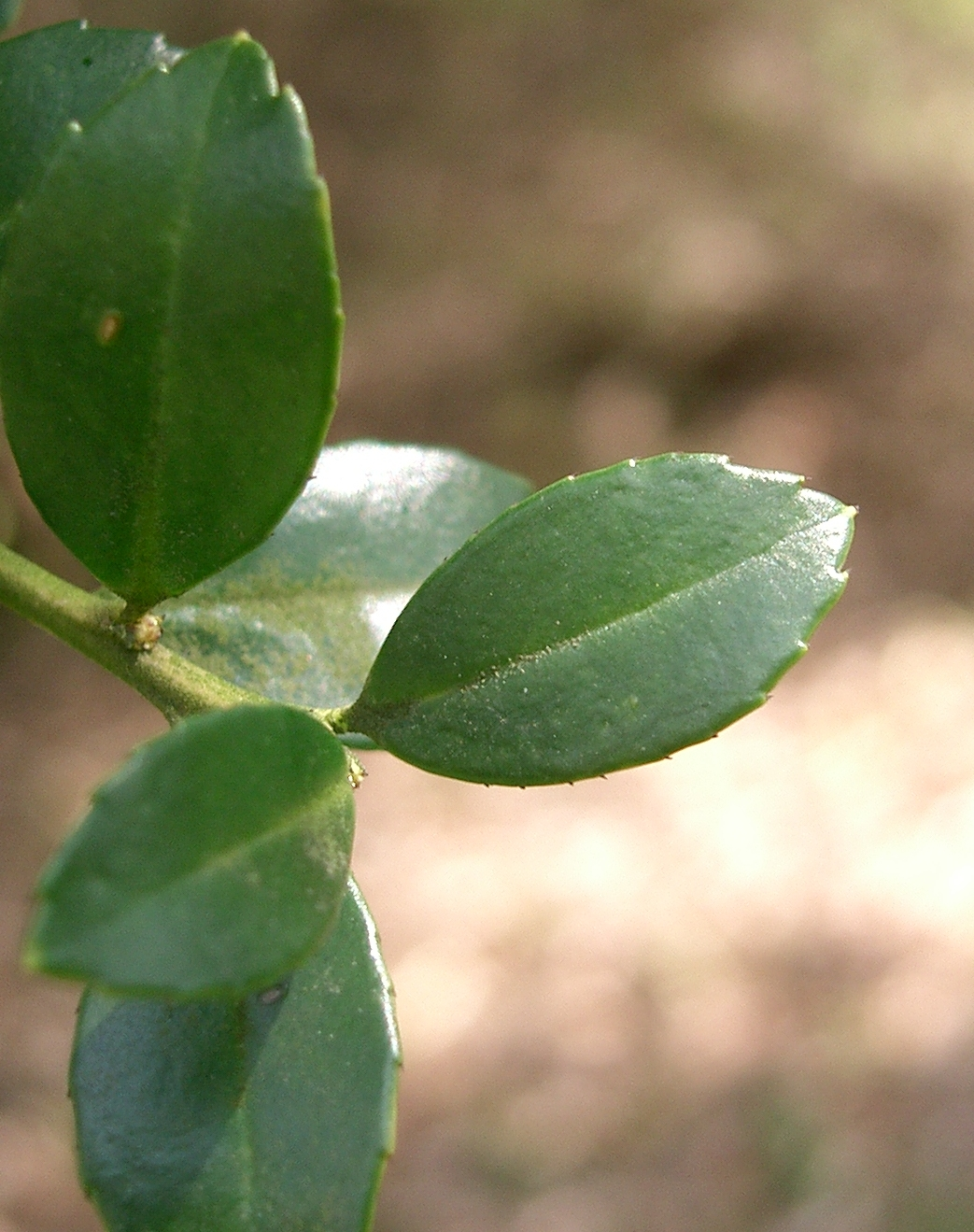

Scientific classification
- Kingdom: Plantae
- Clade: Tracheophytes
- Clade: Angiosperms
- Clade: Eudicots
- Clade: Asterids
- Order: Aquifoliales
- Family: Aquifoliaceae
- Genus: Ilex
- Species: I. crenata

Binomial name
- Ilex crenata Thunb.

= Ilex crenata =

Species of holly

Ilex crenata, also known as Japanese holly or box-leaved holly, is a species of flowering plant in the family Aquifoliaceae, native to East and Southeast Asia.

== Distribution and habitat ==
I. crenata is native to temperate and subtropical parts of eastern China (including Hainan), Japan, Korea, Taiwan, the Himalayas (Nepal, India, Tibet), Myanmar, Vietnam and Sakhalin, Russia.

== Description ==
It is an evergreen shrub growing to a height of 3–4 m (rarely 10 m) tall, with a trunk diameter up to 20 cm. The leaves are glossy dark green, small, 10–30 mm long and 10–17 mm broad, with a crenate (wavy) margin, sometimes spiny. The plants are dioecious (having separate male and female plants), with white, four-lobed flowers. The fruit is a black drupe (stone fruit) 5 mm diameter, containing four seeds. It grows well in acidic soil, between a pH of 3.8 and 6.0.

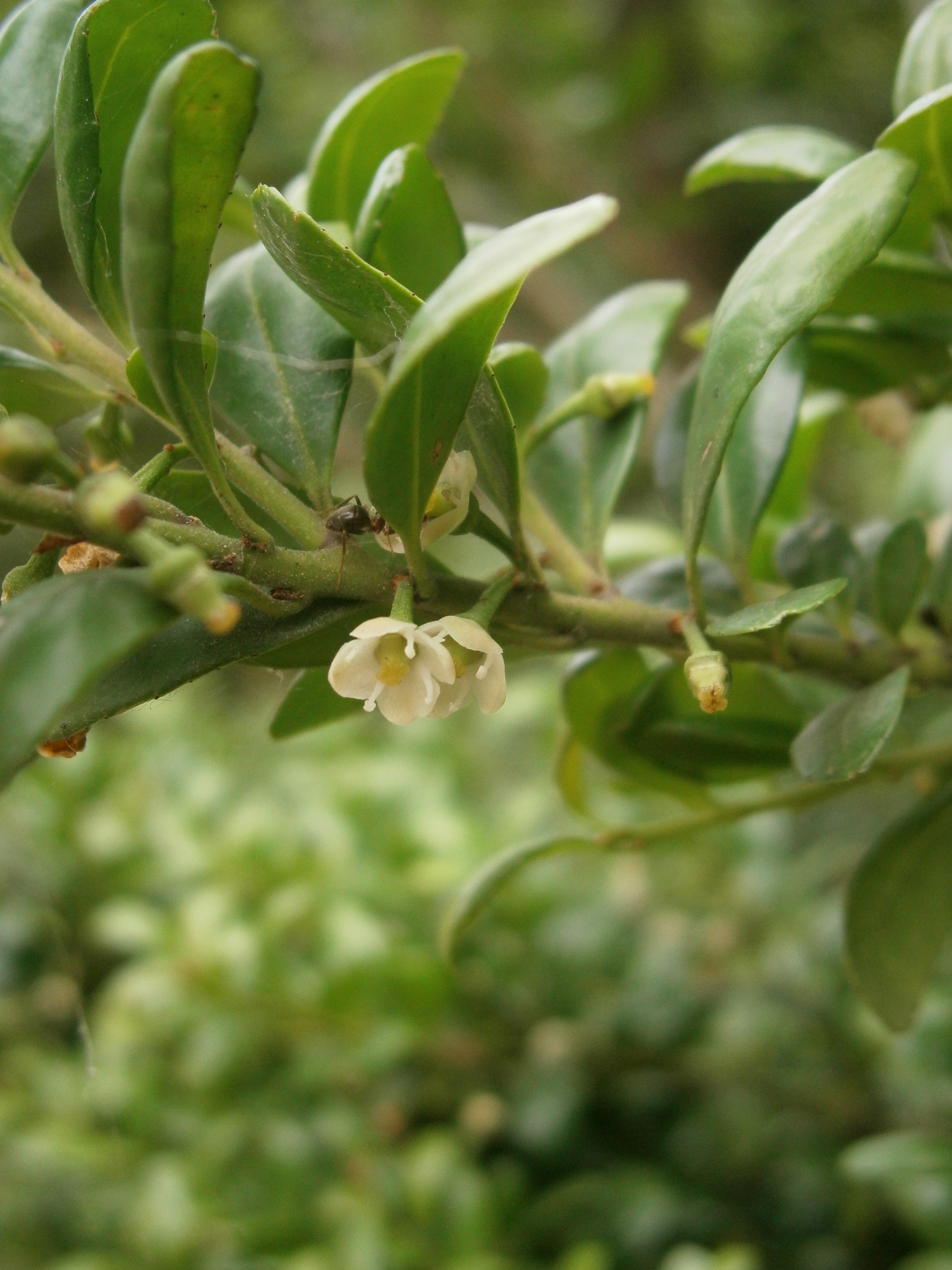
close-up of flowers

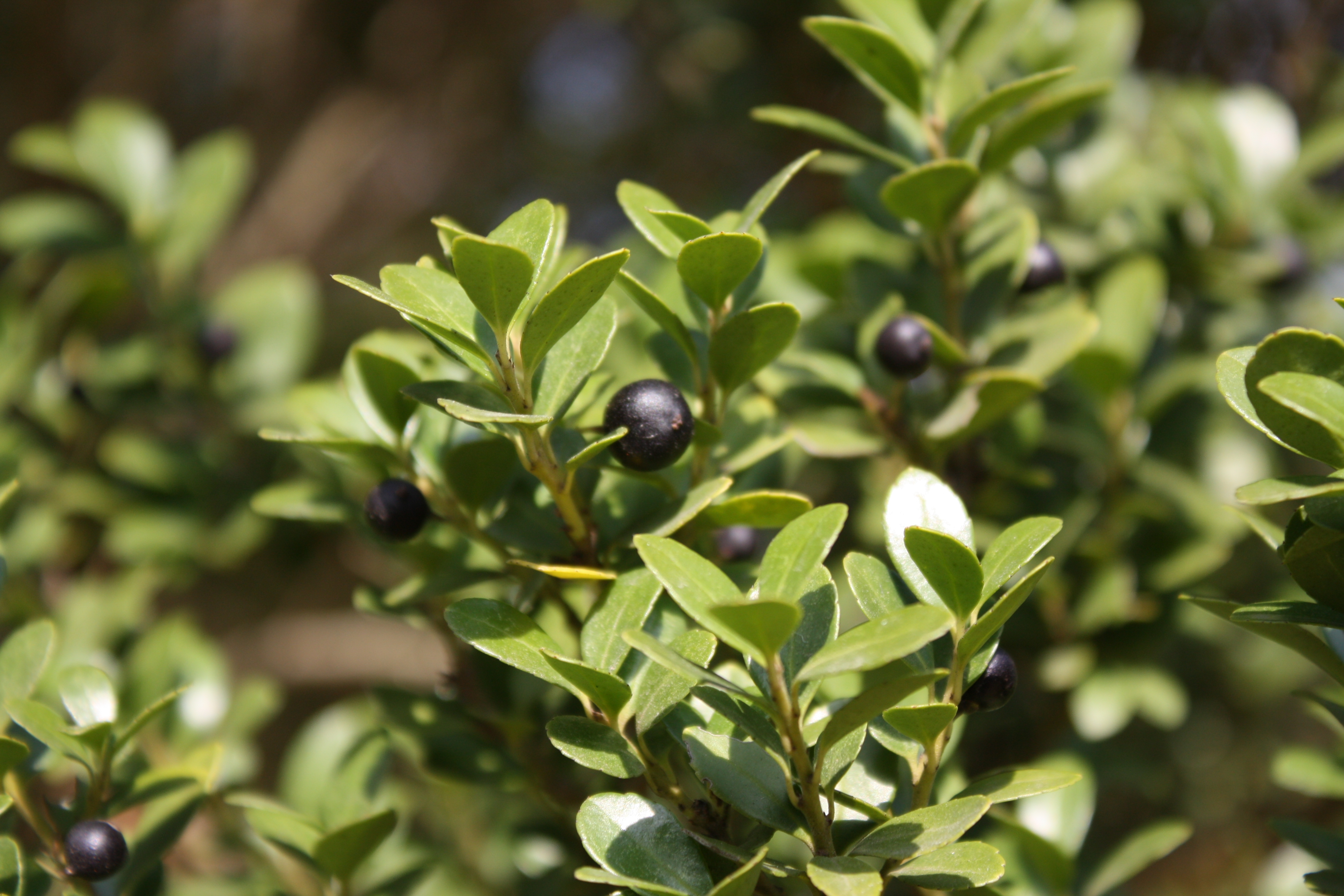
close-up of drupes

== Cultivation ==
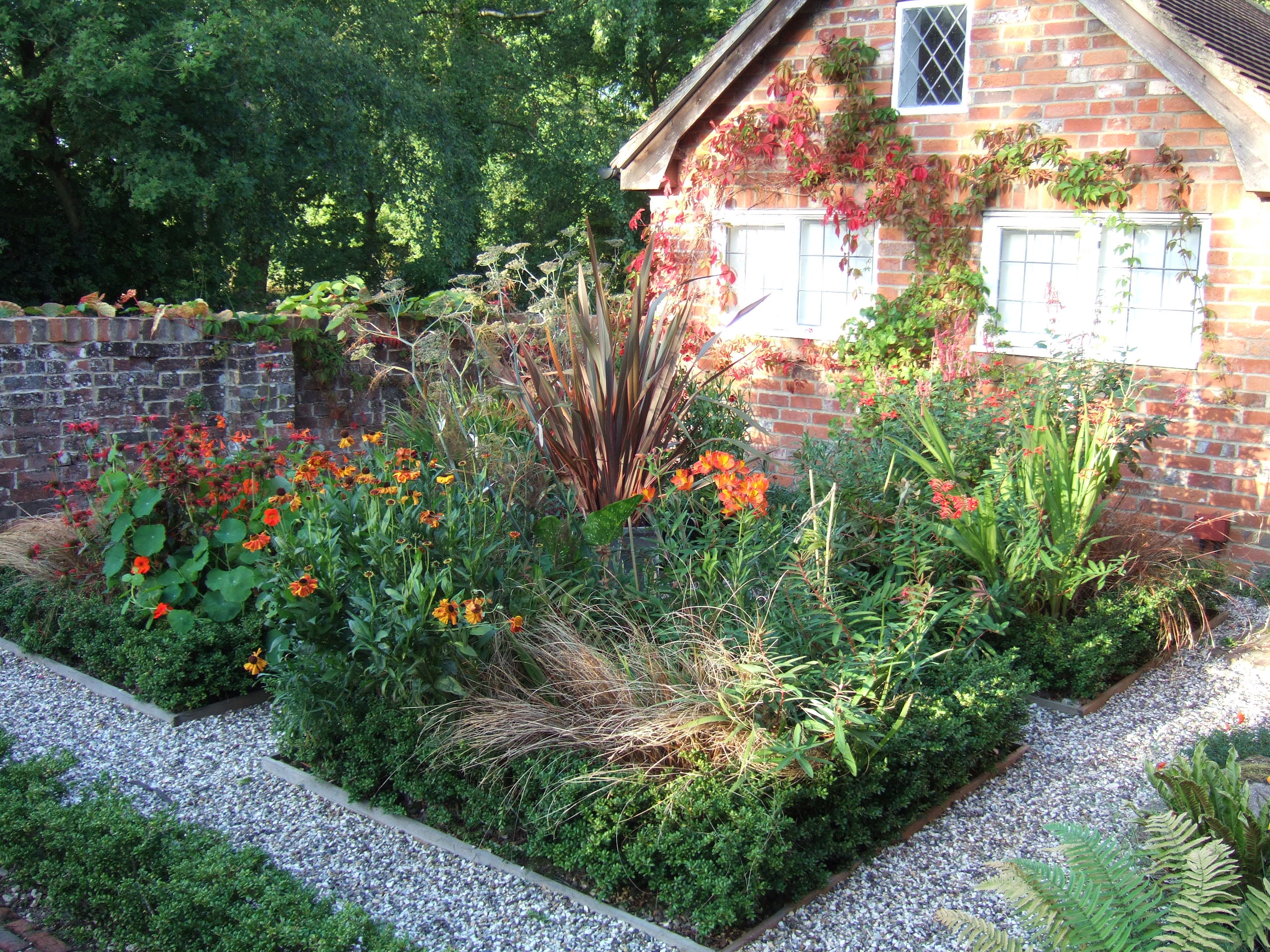
Ilex crenata edging parterre beds in an English garden

Ilex crenata is grown as an ornamental plant for its dense evergreen foliage, and is a popular plant among bonsai enthusiasts and suburban property developers alike. It is superficially similar in appearance to boxwood (box), and is often used in similar situations, such as low hedging; but it can readily be distinguished from boxwood by its alternate, not opposite, leaf arrangement.

Numerous cultivars have been selected, including plants with the leaves variegated (e.g. 'Golden Gem', 'Shiro-Fukurin'), dark green (e.g. 'Green Lustre'), or greyish-green (e.g. 'Bad Zwischenahn'); with yellow fruit (e.g. 'Ivory Hall'); and with an erect habit (e.g. 'Chesapeake' and 'Sky Pencil'), and spreading (e.g. 'Green Island', 'Hetzii'), or dwarf (e.g. 'Mariesii', 'Stokes'). The cultivars 'Golden Gem' and ‘Fastigiata’ (Fastigiata Group) have gained the Royal Horticultural Society's Award of Garden Merit.
