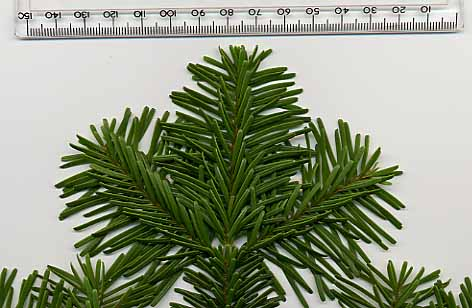
- Pacific silver fir foliage from above

Conservation status
- Least Concern (IUCN 3.1)

Scientific classification
- Kingdom: Plantae
- Clade: Tracheophytes
- Clade: Gymnospermae
- Division: Pinophyta
- Class: Pinopsida
- Order: Pinales
- Family: Pinaceae
- Genus: Abies
- Species: A. amabilis

Binomial name
- Abies amabilis Douglas ex J.Forbes
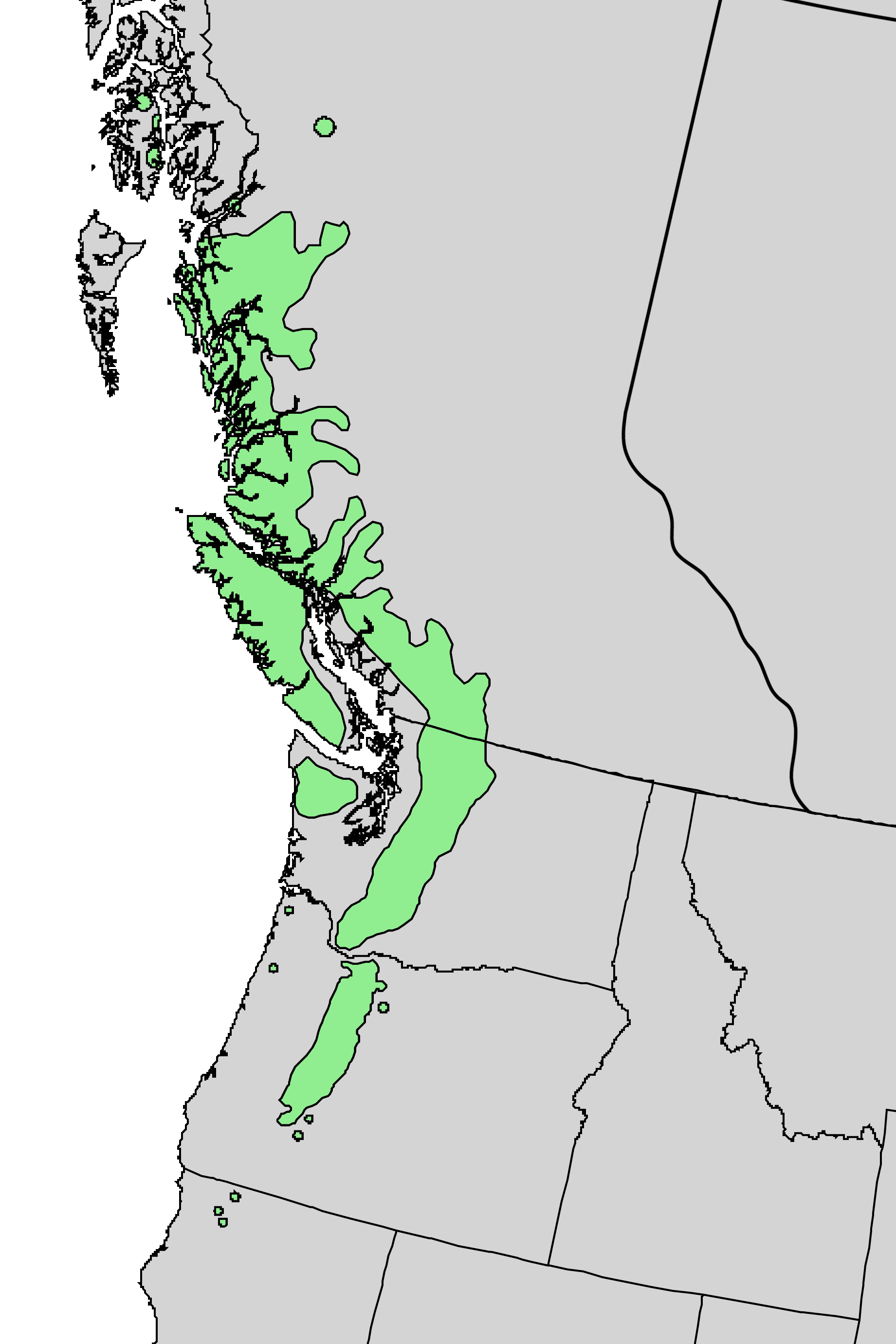
- Range

= Abies amabilis =

Pacific silver fir

Species of conifer

Abies amabilis, commonly known as the Pacific silver fir, is a fir native to the Pacific Northwest of North America, occurring in the Pacific Coast Ranges and the Cascade Range. It is also commonly referred to in English as the white fir, red fir, lovely fir, amabilis fir, Cascades fir, or silver fir.

== Description ==
The tree is a large evergreen conifer growing to 30–50 metres (98–164 feet), exceptionally 72 m (236 ft) tall, and with a trunk diameter of up to 1.2 m (4 ft), exceptionally 2.3 m (7 1/2 ft). The bark on younger trees is light grey, thin and covered with resin blisters. On older trees, it darkens and develops scales and furrows. The leaves are needle-like, flattened, 1–4.5 centimetres (3/8–1 3/4 in) long and 2 millimetres (1/16 in) wide by 0.5 mm (1/32 in) thick, dark green above, and with two white bands of stomata below, and slightly notched at the tip. The leaf arrangement is spiral on the shoot, but with each leaf variably twisted at the base so they lie flat to either side of and above the shoot, with none below the shoot. The shoots are orange-red with dense velvety pubescence.

The cones are 8–17 cm (3–6 1/2 in) long and 4–6 cm (1 1/2–2 1/4 in) broad, dark purple before maturity; the scale bracts are short, and hidden in the closed cone. The brownish winged seeds are 3.5 mm (1/8 in) long and released when the cones disintegrate at maturity about 6–7 months after pollination.

The tree can live to over 400 years old. The oldest known individual, on Mount Cain, was about 920 years old when it was sampled.

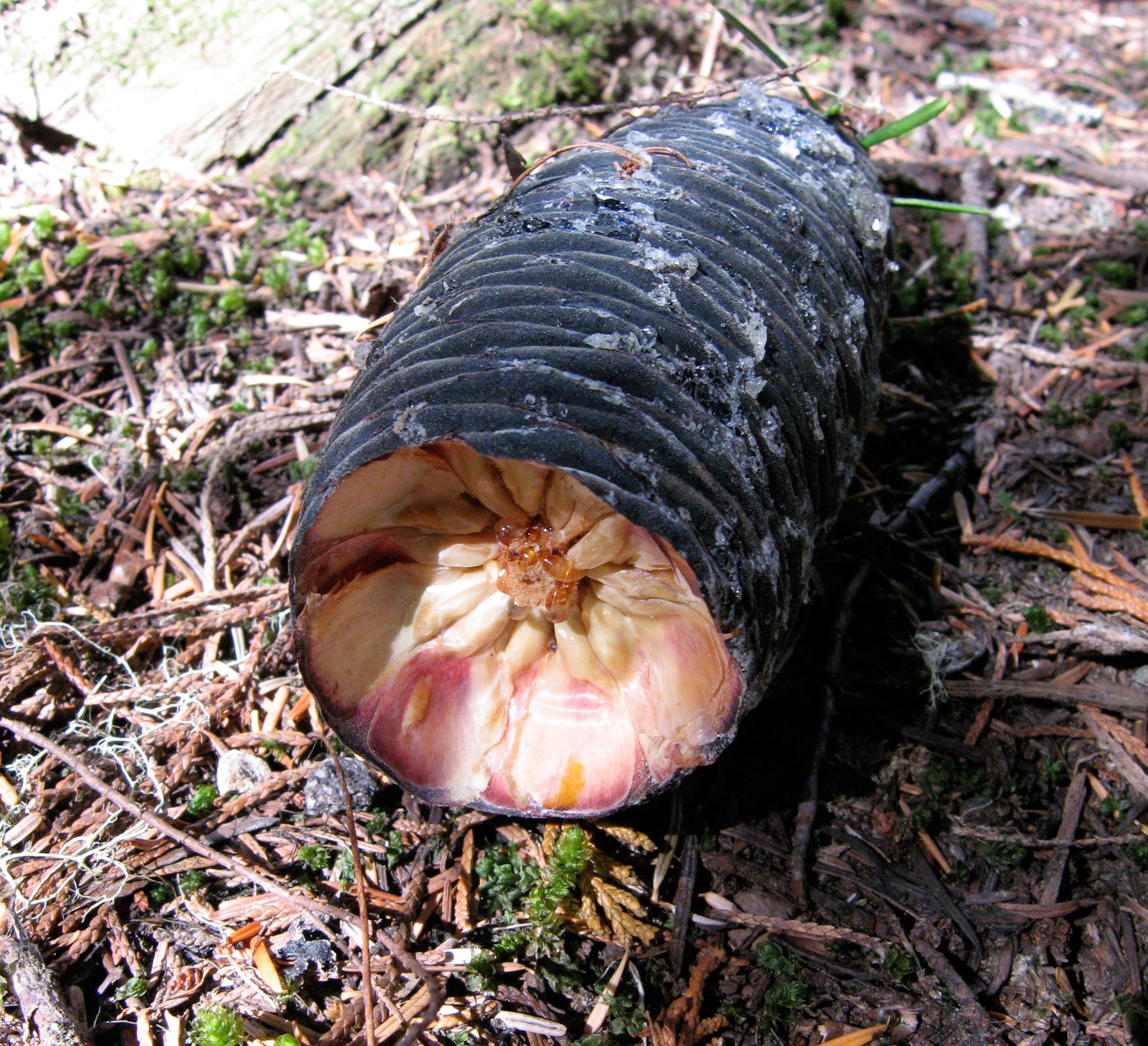
Cone, with the top broken to show the seeds

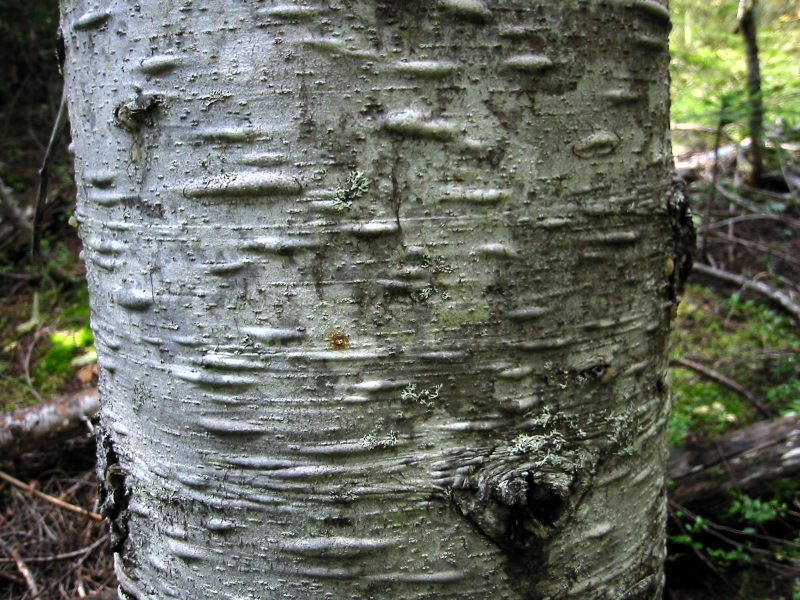
Bark

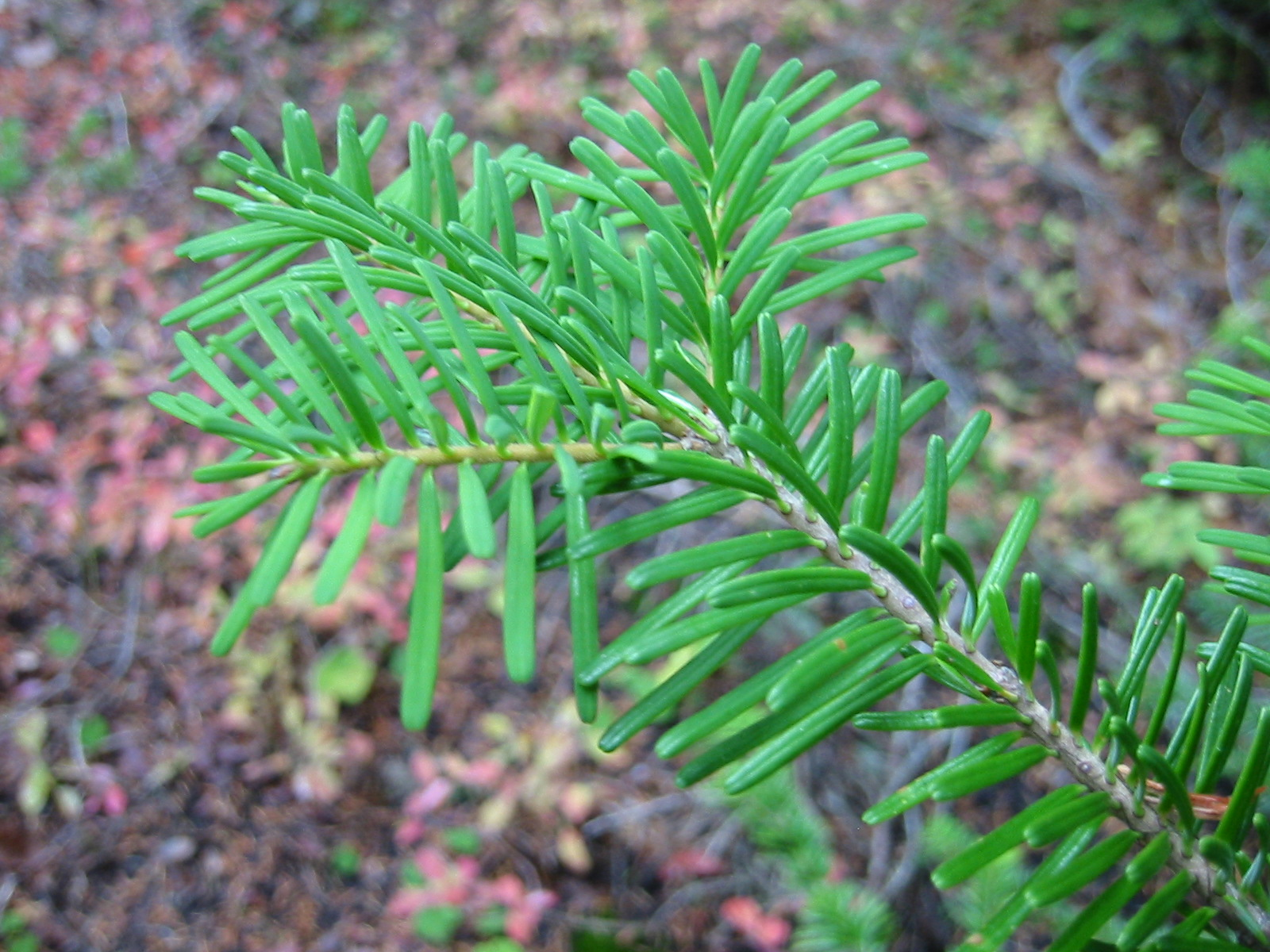
Foliage top

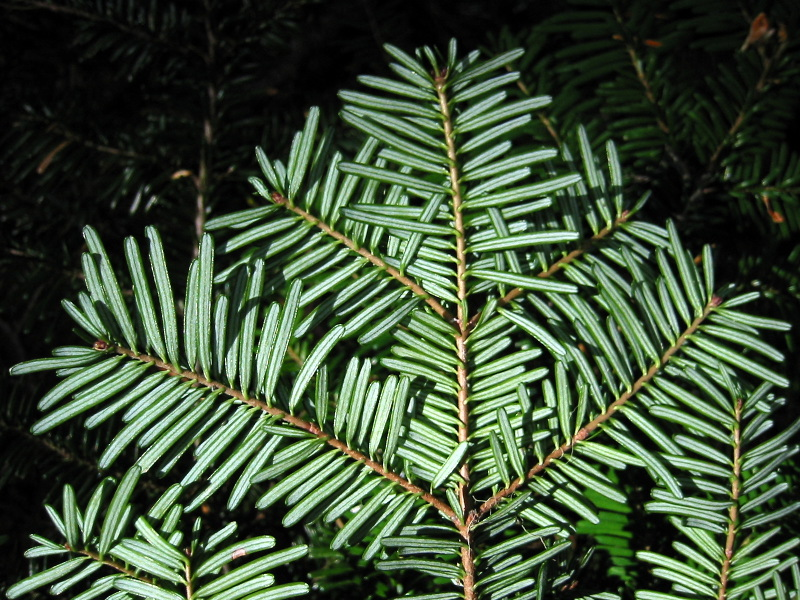
Foliage bottom

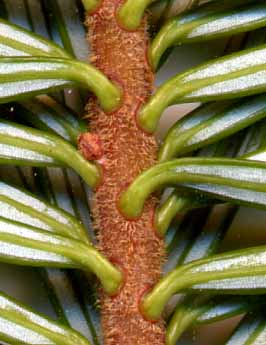
Close-up of shoot from below

=== Similar species ===
Pacific silver fir is very closely related to A. mariesii (Maries' fir) from Japan, which is distinguished by its slightly shorter leaves, being 1.5–2.5 cm (5/8–1 in) long, and smaller cones, which are 5–11 cm (2–4 1/4 in) long.

== Etymology ==
The species name is Latin for 'lovely'.

== Distribution and ecology ==
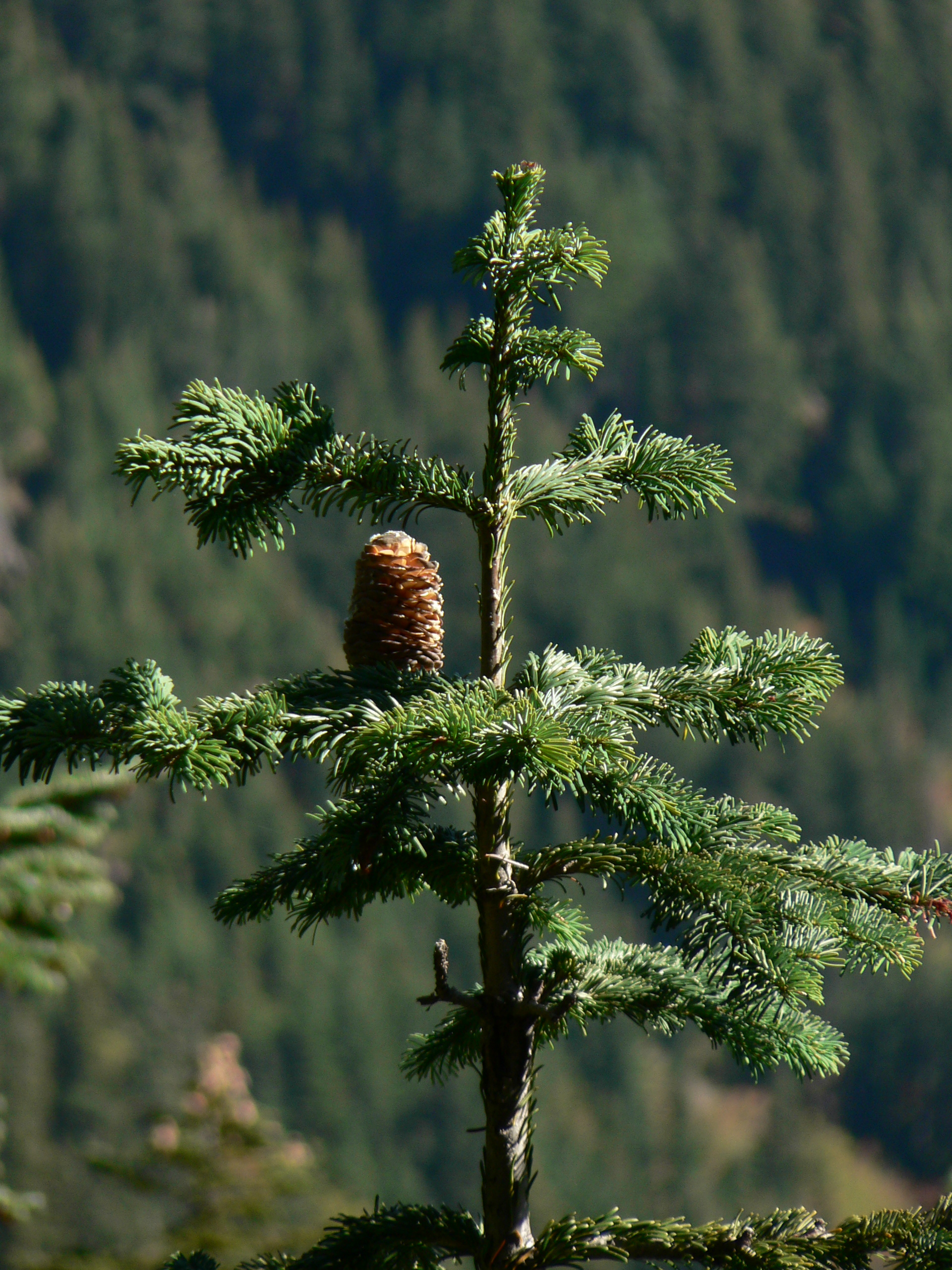
Cone growing in the Pacific Northwest

The species is native to the Pacific Northwest of North America, occurring in the Pacific Coast Ranges and the Cascade Range from the extreme southeast of Alaska, through western British Columbia, Washington and Oregon, to the extreme northwest of California. It grows from sea level to 1,000 m (3,300 ft) in the north of the range, and to 610–2,000 m (2,000–6,560 ft) in the south of the range. Populations on the east slope of the Cascades are confined to elevations above 1,000 m (3,300 ft) in Washington and 1,160 m (3,810 ft) in Oregon.

It is always found in temperate rainforests with relatively high precipitation and cool, humid summers. Growing in dense stands, it prospers in shade and snow. Common associate trees are western hemlock in northern ranges, Douglas-fir in central areas, and California buckeye in the extreme southern area of its range. Western hemlock is equally shade tolerant, but Pacific silver fir saplings are more resilient of ground obstacles. Though its thin bark makes it susceptible to fire, the slow-growing saplings succeed less shade-tolerant species. It survives well at high elevation, but eventually succumbs to root or heart rot, in addition to diseases and insects such as Adelges piceae.

On northeastern Vancouver Island, Pacific silver fir grows along with western hemlock in dense forests with sparse understory vegetation. Another type of forest dominated by western redcedar and western hemlock with more open canopies and an understories composed primarily of salal (Gaultheria shallon) also occurs in the area. The two forest types occur in areas with very similar environmental conditions and are separated by sharp boundaries, often less than 10 m (33 ft) wide. Western redcedar recruitment is nearly absent in the western hemlock–Pacific silver fir forest type, and there is no evidence of a transitional stage between the two types. It has been hypothesized that, once established, these forest types are self-sustaining and are unlikely to change unless a major disturbance occurs.

== Uses ==
Indigenous Nations, including the Nuxalk, Haisla, and Kitasoo, used A. amabilis for medicinal purposes. Ethnobotanist Daniel Moerman notes, for example, that Nuxalk Peoples mixed mountain goat tallow with liquid pitch to treat sore throat. An infusion of bark, by contrast, may have been used to address stomach issues.

In addition to medicinal uses, hardened pitch of the plant was sometimes chewed for pleasure by the Ditidaht Peoples. The foliage has an attractive scent and was admired for its scent long before the arrival of European settlers in its native range. The Ditidaht brought boughs into their homes as an air freshener, whereas Nlakaʼpamux peoples boiled boughs to create unique plant-based hair perfumes.

The wood is soft and not very strong; settlers thus tended to use this species for paper making, packing crates, and other cheap construction work. The lumber is often paired with that of western hemlock.

Seeds were not brought to Europe for cultivation until the 19th century, when David Douglas first transported seed to Britain in 1830. Today, the tree is sometimes planted as an ornamental tree in parks and large gardens, though its requirement for cool, humid summers limits its optimal areas; successful growth away from its native range is restricted to areas like western Scotland and southern New Zealand. Pacific silver fir is sometimes used for Christmas decoration, including Christmas trees.
