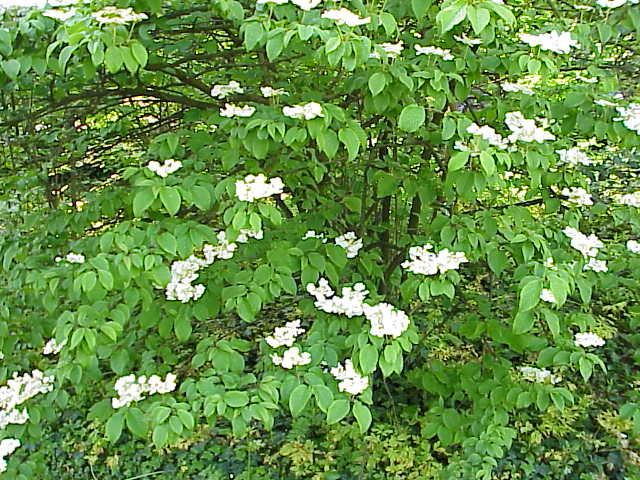

Scientific classification
- Kingdom: Plantae
- Clade: Tracheophytes
- Clade: Angiosperms
- Clade: Eudicots
- Clade: Asterids
- Order: Dipsacales
- Family: Viburnaceae
- Genus: Viburnum
- Species: V. plicatum

Binomial name
- Viburnum plicatum Thunb.

= Viburnum plicatum =

Species of flowering plant

Viburnum plicatum is a species of flowering plant in the family Viburnaceae (formerly Caprifoliaceae), native to mainland China, Korea, Japan, and Taiwan. The Latin specific epithet plicatum means "pleated", referring to the texture of the leaves.

== Description ==
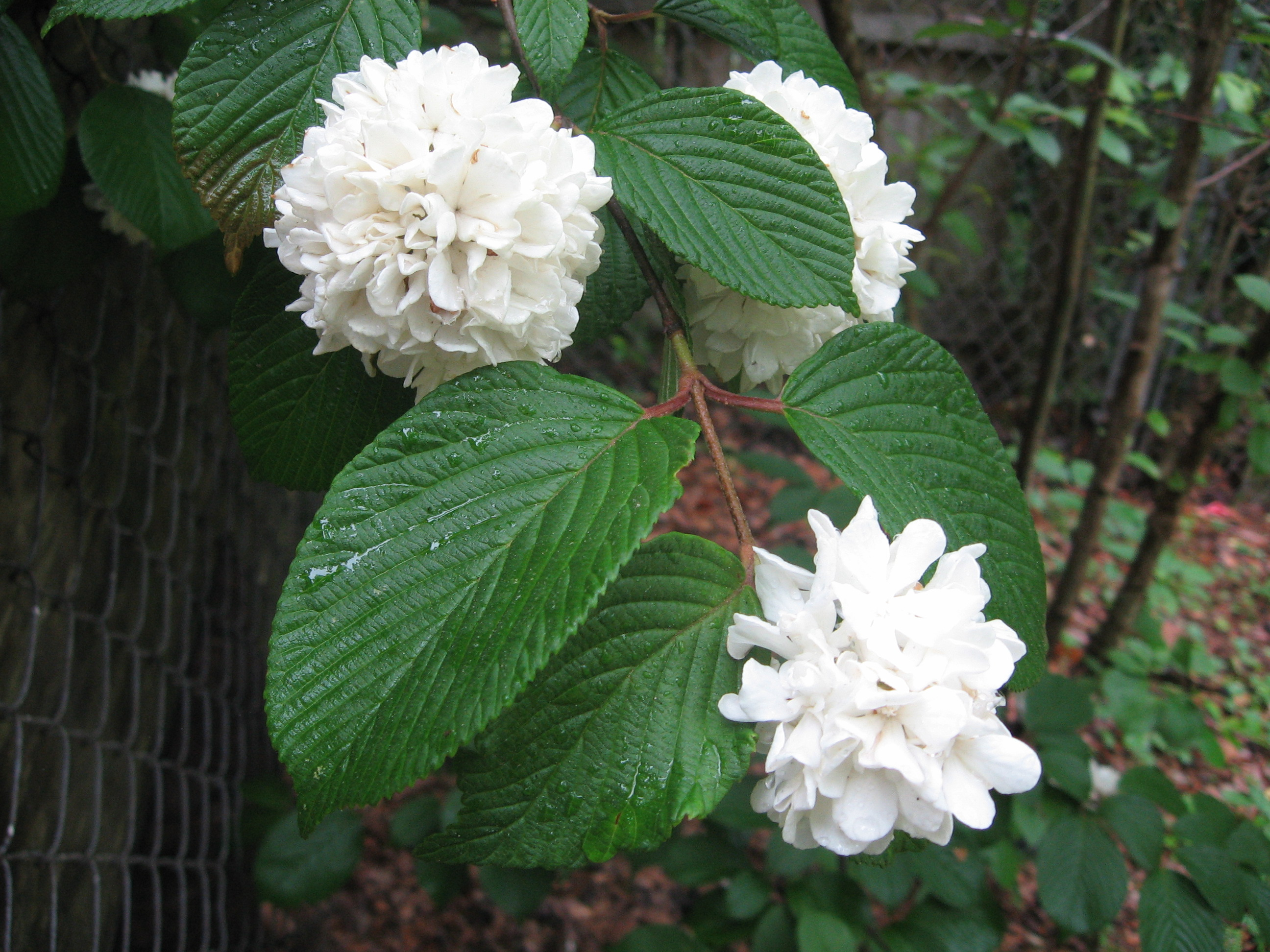
"Snowball" flowers of a sterile cultivar

Growing to 3 m (10 ft) tall, it is a deciduous shrub. The leaves are opposite, 5–10 cm (2–4 in) long and 3–6 cm (1–2 in) broad, simple ovate to oval, with a serrated margin.

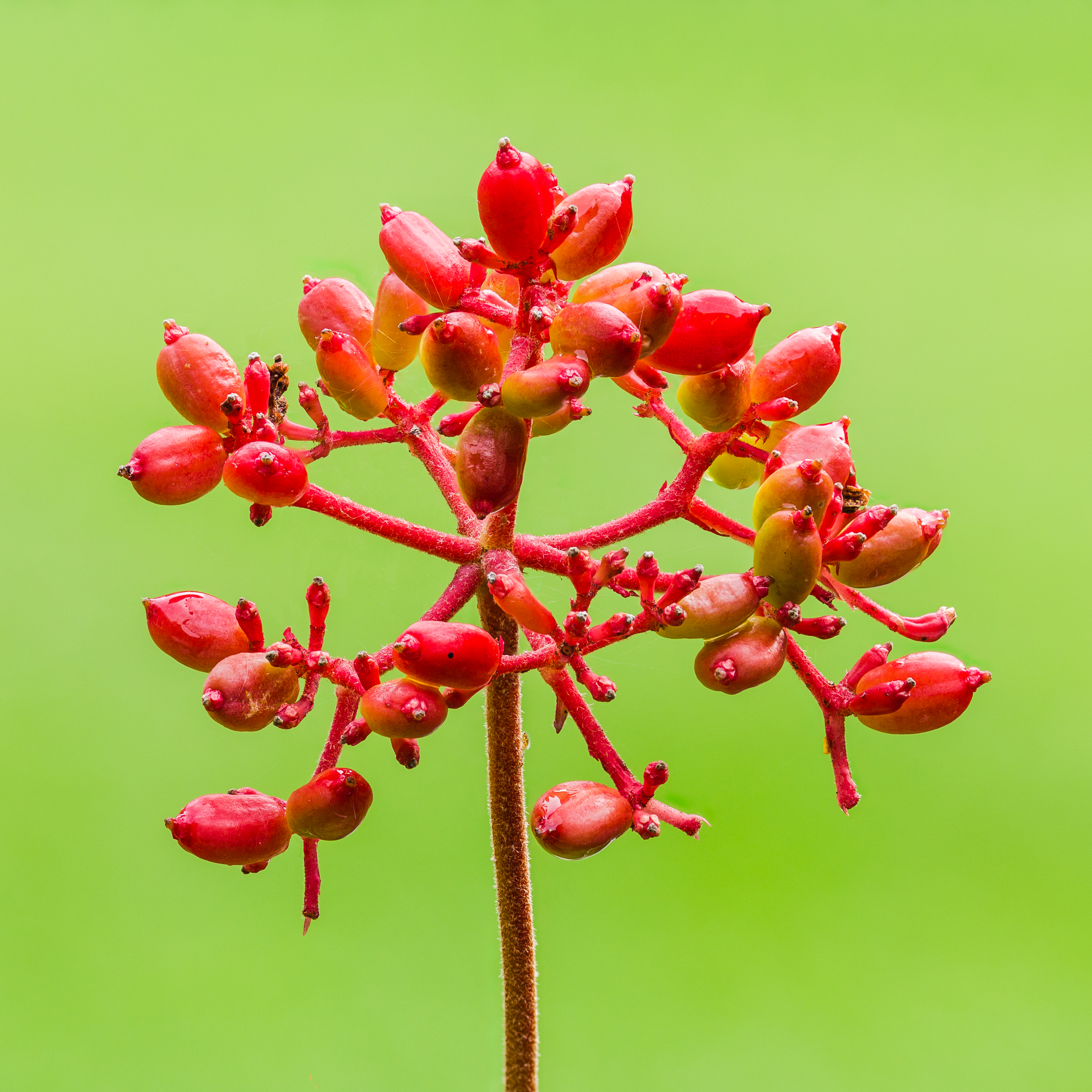
Ripening seeds of a Viburnum plicatum

Plants from Taiwan are sometimes distinguished as Viburnum plicatum var. formosanum Liu & Ou.

=== Inflorescences ===
The flowers are produced in flat corymbs 5–10 cm (2–4 in) in diameter, comprising a central cluster of fertile yellowish-white flowers 5 mm (0.20 in) in diameter, surrounded by a ring of showy, sterile flowers 2–3 cm (0.8–1.2 in) in diameter, which act as a target guide to pollinating insects. The fruit is an ovoid blue-black drupe 8–10 mm long.

== Cultivation ==
Viburnum plicatum is a popular ornamental plant, both in its native area and other temperate regions. Some of the more popular cultivars are selected for having all of their flowers large and sterile with few or no fertile flowers; their flowerheads resemble a snowball, giving them the popular name Japanese snowball bush. Cultivars of this type include 'Grandiflorum' and 'Rotundifolium'.

=== Cultivars ===
Cultivars with wild-type flowerhead structure are sometimes described as a separate botanical form V. plicatum f. tomentosum. They include 'Cascade', 'Lanarth' and 'Rowallane'.

The following cultivars in this group have received the Royal Horticultural Society's Award of Garden Merit:

- 'Cascade'
- 'Mariesii'
- 'Pink Beauty'
- 'Popcorn'
- 'Summer Snowflake'
