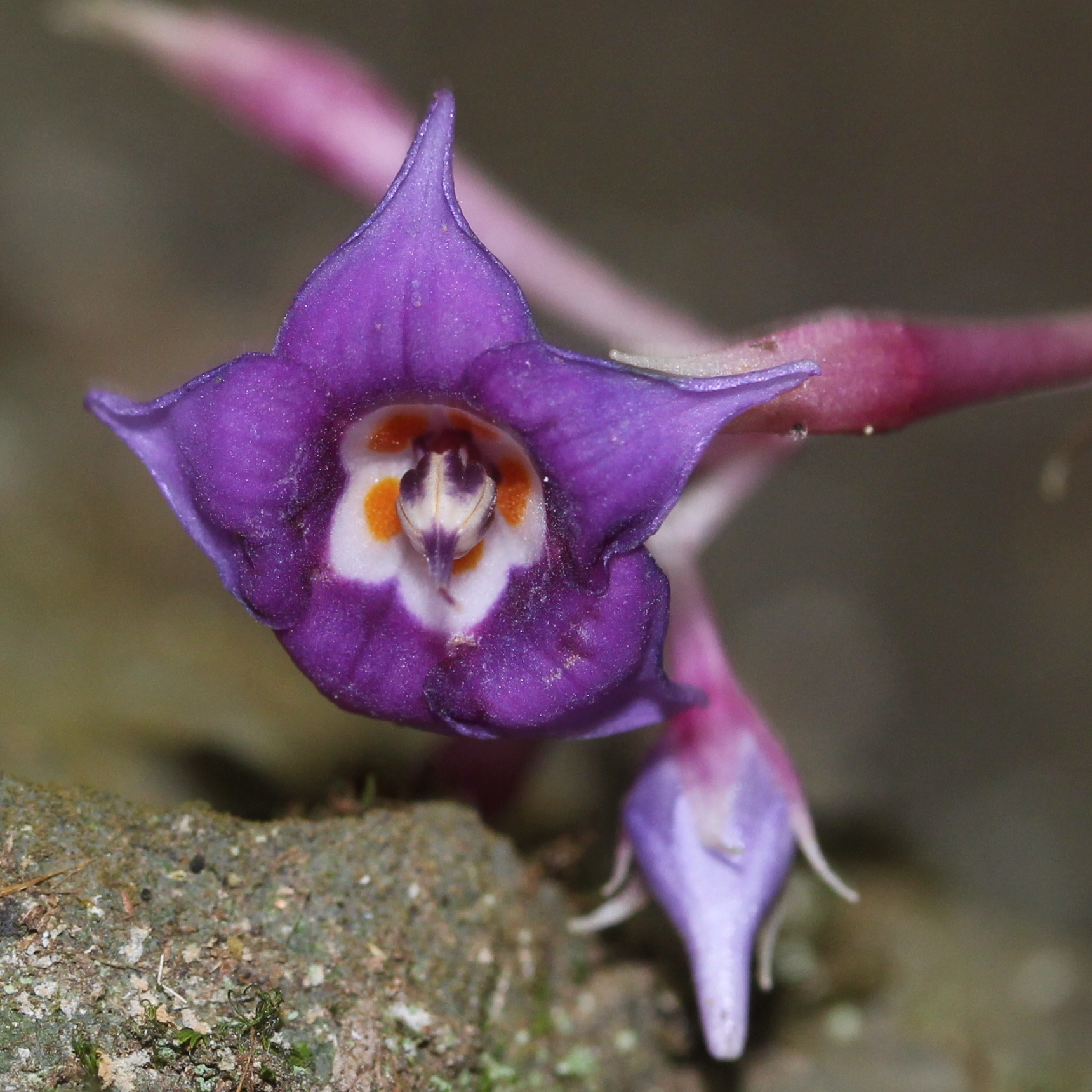

Scientific classification
- Kingdom: Plantae
- Clade: Tracheophytes
- Clade: Angiosperms
- Clade: Eudicots
- Clade: Asterids
- Order: Lamiales
- Family: Gesneriaceae
- Genus: Conandron; Siebold & Zuccarini (1843)
- Species: C. ramondioides

Binomial name
- Conandron ramondioides Siebold & Zucc. (1843)

Synonyms
- Conandron minor T.Itô (1908); Conandron ramondioides var. leucanthus Nakai (1928); Conandron ramondioides f. leucanthus (Nakai) Okuyama (1955); Conandron ramondioides var. pilosus Makino (1908); Conandron ramondioides f. pilosus (Makino) Ohwi (1953); Conandron ramondioides f. pilosus (Makino) Ohwi (1953); Conandron ramondioides var. pilosus Nakai (1928), nom. illeg.; Conandron ramondioides var. ryukyuensis Masam. (1970); Conandron ramondioides var. taiwanensis Masam. (1939); Conandron ramondioides f. variegatus Nakai (1928)

= Conandron =

Species of flowering plant

Conandron ramondioides is a species of flowering plant in the family Gesneriaceae. It is the sole species in genus Conandron. It is native to eastern Asia, where it is found in southeastern China, Japan, Taiwan, and Vietnam. Its natural habitat is on damp rock faces, in forests and along streamsides. It is a common species in Japan.

It is a perennial, growing to ~30 cm tall. It has large basal leaves. Flowers are purple and produced in the summer.

Its Japanese name (岩煙草) is "rock tobacco", in reference to the resemblance of its leaves to tobacco, and its preference to grow on exposed rock.

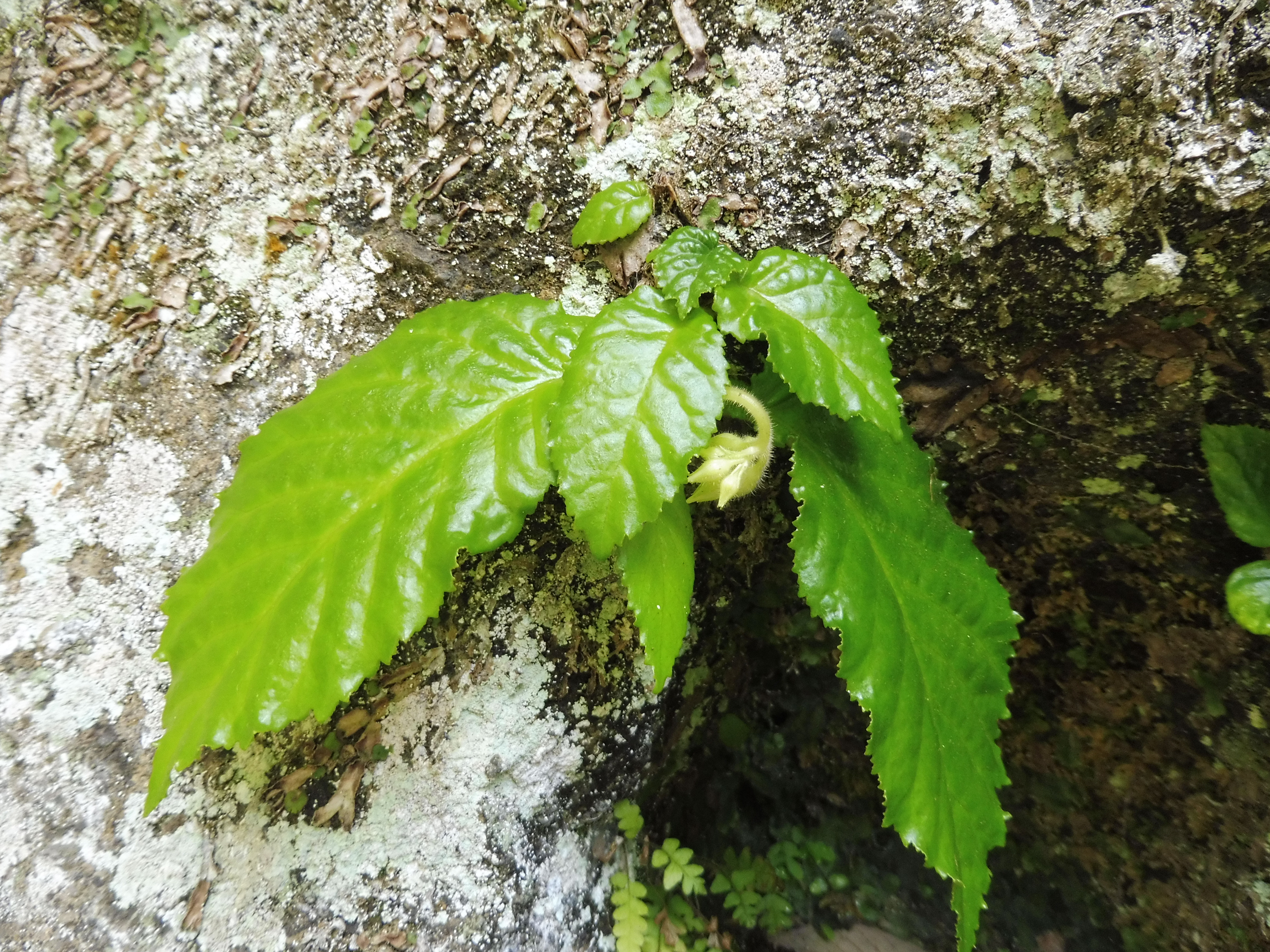
Basal leaves and young flower bud
