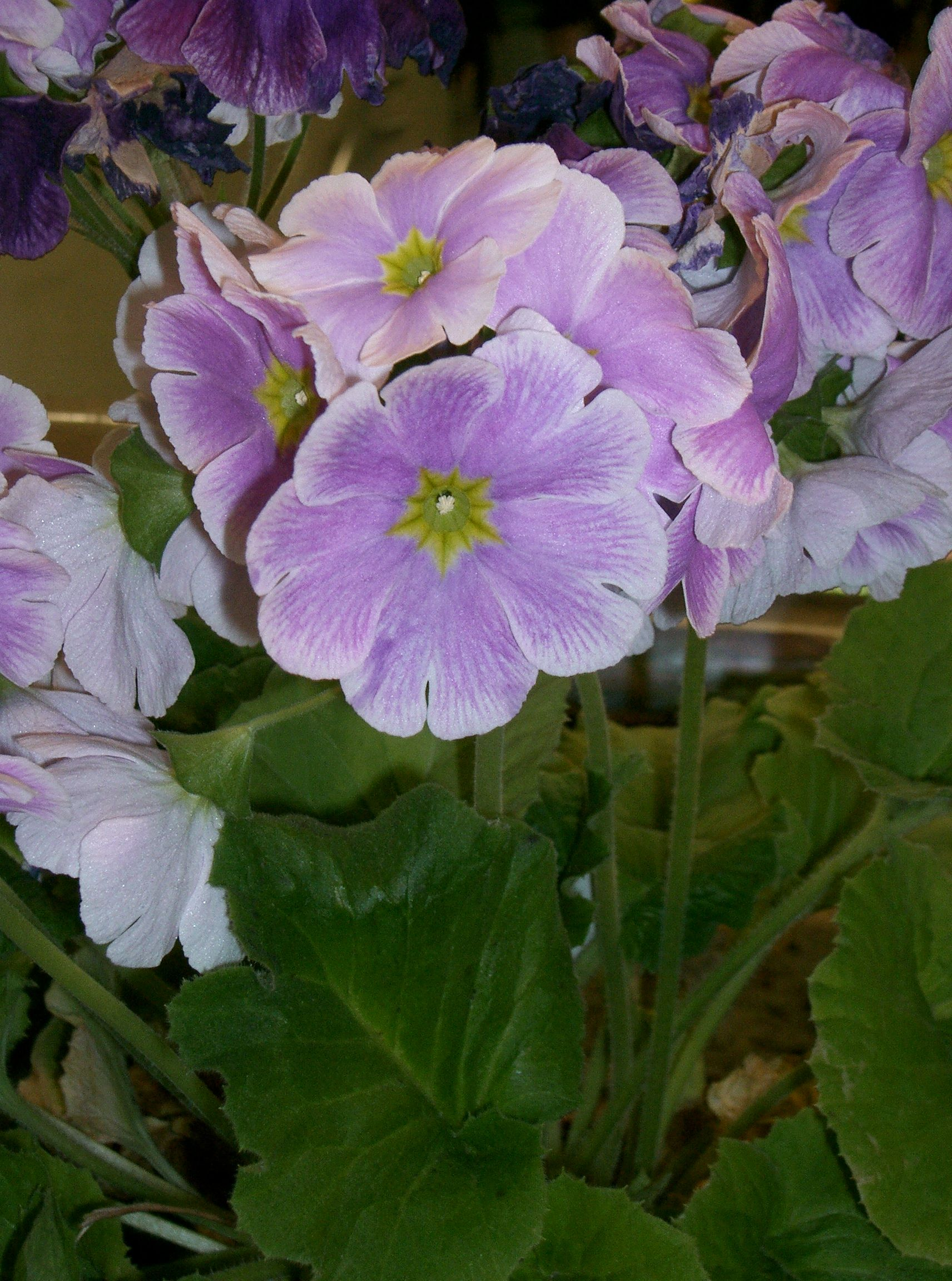

Scientific classification
- Kingdom: Plantae
- Clade: Tracheophytes
- Clade: Angiosperms
- Clade: Eudicots
- Clade: Asterids
- Order: Ericales
- Family: Primulaceae
- Genus: Primula
- Species: P. obconica

Binomial name
- Primula obconica Hance

= Primula obconica =

Species of flowering plant

Primula obconica commonly referred to as the German Primrose is a species of flowering plant in the family Primulaceae, native to China. It is a short-lived evergreen perennial growing to 40 cm (16 in) tall by 25 cm (10 in) broad, with rosettes of coarse, heart-shaped leaves, and thick stalks bearing umbels of lavender flowers in late winter and early spring.

The specific epithet obconica means "inverted cone", referring to the convex flowers.

This is a tender plant which us usually grown annually as a houseplant or in a cool greenhouse. Numerous cultivars have been developed, of which 'Libre Magenta' has gained the Royal Horticultural Society's Award of Garden Merit.

The hairs on the leaves may cause allergic reactions.
