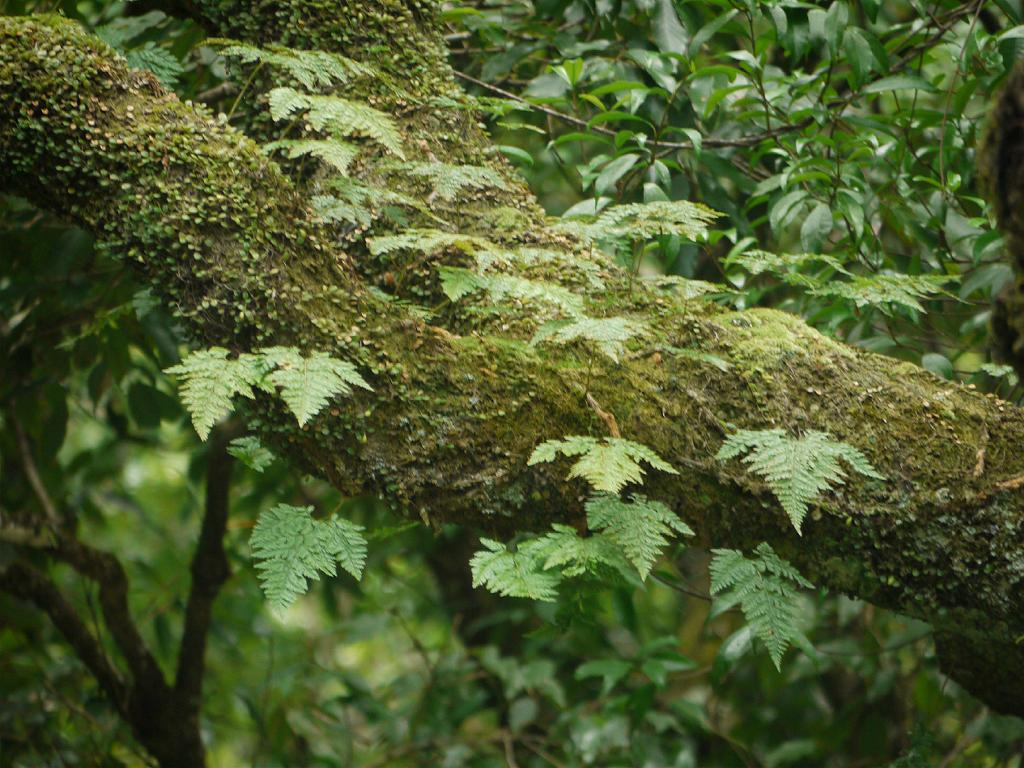

Scientific classification
- Kingdom: Plantae
- Clade: Tracheophytes
- Division: Polypodiophyta
- Class: Polypodiopsida
- Order: Polypodiales
- Suborder: Polypodiineae
- Family: Davalliaceae
- Genus: Davallia
- Species: D. mariesii

Binomial name
- Davallia mariesii T.Moore ex Baker

= Davallia mariesii =

Species of fern

Davallia mariesii, the squirrel's foot fern, is a species of epiphytic fern native to Japan and eastern Asia. It is deciduous, growing to 15 cm (6 in), with rhizomes covered in brown scales and finely-dissected, flat, triangular fronds. If provided with winter protection, it is hardy down to −7 °C (19 °F). In cultivation it is used as groundcover in moist, shady areas.

This plant has gained the Royal Horticultural Society's Award of Garden Merit.
