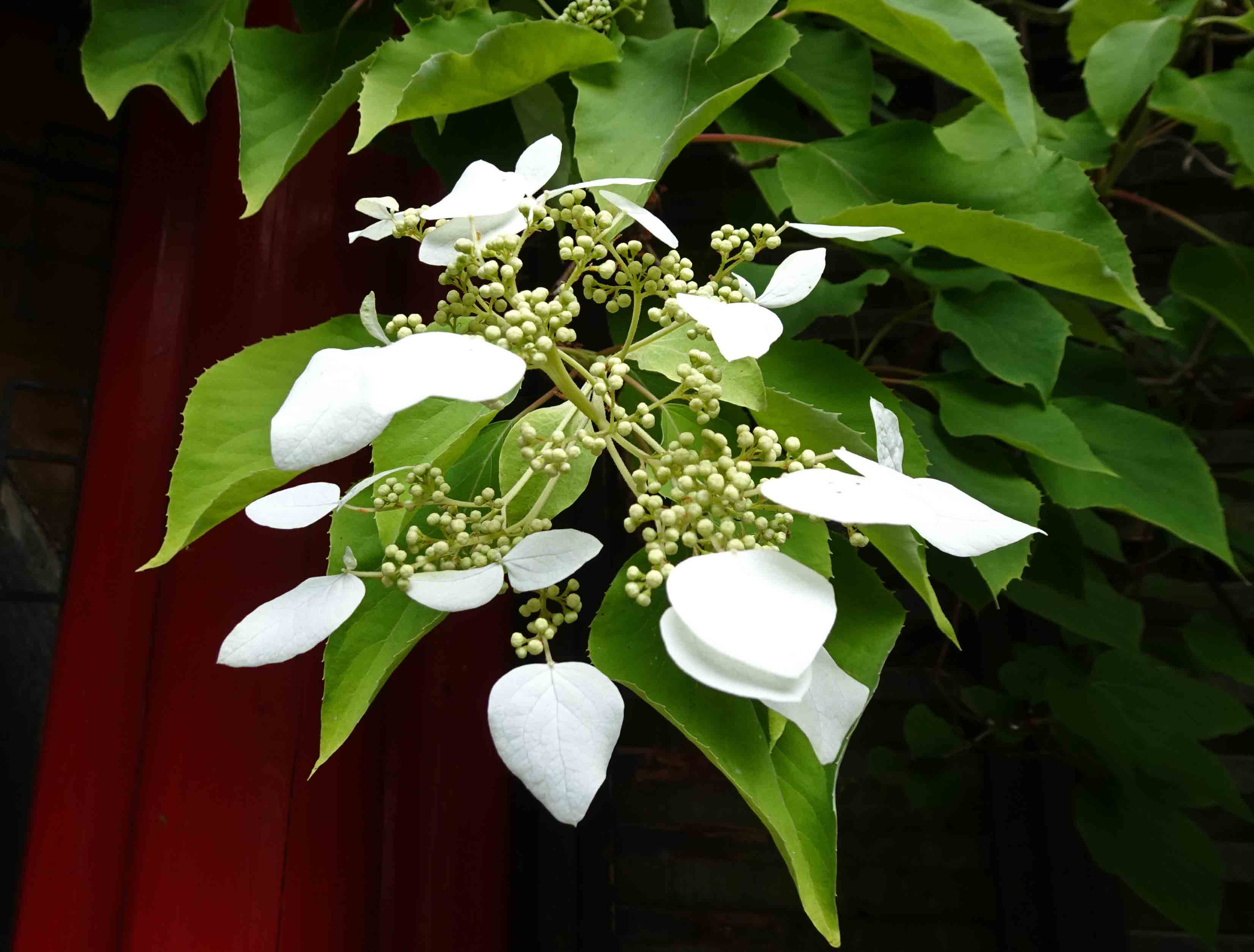
- Cultivated specimen at the UBC Botanical Garden, Canada
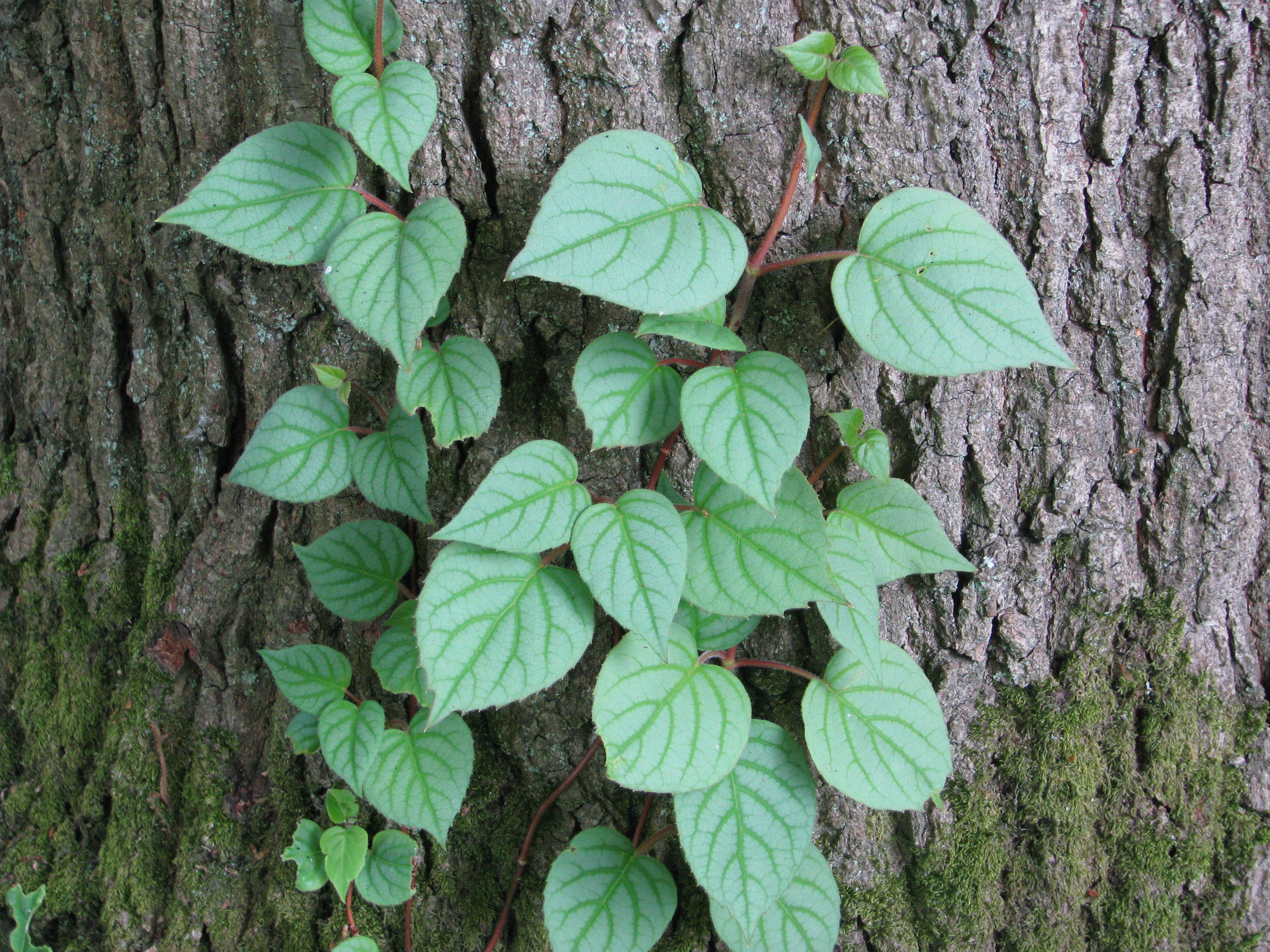
- Hydrangea hydrangeoides vine cultivated in the United Kingdom

Scientific classification
- Kingdom: Plantae
- Clade: Tracheophytes
- Clade: Angiosperms
- Clade: Eudicots
- Clade: Asterids
- Order: Cornales
- Family: Hydrangeaceae
- Genus: Hydrangea
- Species: H. hydrangeoides

Binomial name
- Hydrangea hydrangeoides (Siebold & Zucc.) Bernd Schulz

Synonyms
- List: Hydrangea taquetii H.Lév.; Schizophragma hydrangeoides Siebold & Zucc.; Schizophragma hydrangeoides f. concolor (Hatus.) H.Ohba; Schizophragma hydrangeoides f. molle (Honda) H.Hara ex H.Ohba; Schizophragma hydrangeoides var. taquetii (H.Lév.) J.M.H.Shaw; Schizophragma hydrangeoides var. ullungdoense J.M.H.Shaw; Schizophragma hydrangeoides var. yakushimense J.M.H.Shaw

= Hydrangea hydrangeoides =

Species of flowering plant

Hydrangea hydrangeoides, the Japanese hydrangea vine, is a species of flowering plant in the family Hydrangeaceae, native to Ulleungdo Island of South Korea, Japan, and the southern Kuril Islands.

== Etymology ==
The specific epithet hydrangeoides means "resembling Hydrangea" or "like a Hydrangea". This may appear strange considering the current position of this taxon within the genus Hydrangea. However, it was first described as a member of the genus Schizophragma and the specific epithet was chosen to express a morphological similarity to the previously separate genus Hydrangea.

== Horticulture ==
Under its synonym Schizophragma hydrangeoides its cultivars 'Roseum' and 'Moonlight' have gained the Royal Horticultural Society's Award of Garden Merit.

In cultivation this species is slow to establish.
