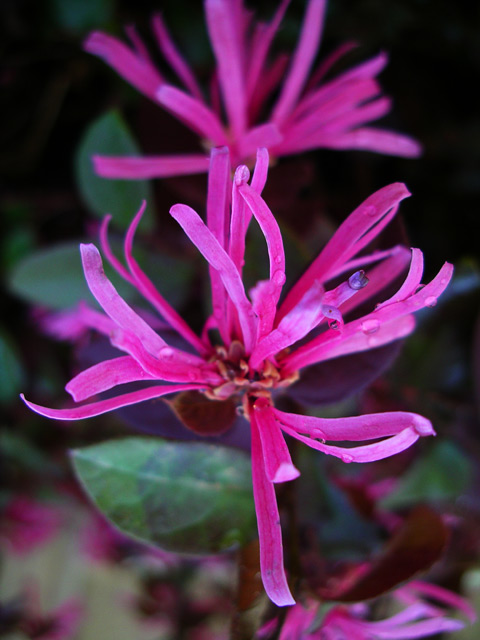
- Loropetalum chinense var. rubrum

Scientific classification
- Kingdom: Plantae
- Clade: Tracheophytes
- Clade: Angiosperms
- Clade: Eudicots
- Order: Saxifragales
- Family: Hamamelidaceae
- Genus: Loropetalum
- Species: L. chinense

Binomial name
- Loropetalum chinense (R.Br.) Oliv.

= Loropetalum chinense =

Species of flowering plant

Loropetalum chinense, commonly known as loropetalum, Chinese fringe flower and strap flower is a shrub or small tree in the witch-hazel family, Hamamelidaceae.

== Description ==
They are evergreen with branches forming horizontal layers. The leaves are alternately arranged, ovate 2.5 to 5 cm (1 to 2 in) long by 2.5 cm (1 in) wide, and have a slightly abrasive feel.

== Cultivation and uses ==
Loropetalum chinense grows best in fertile, slightly acidic soil in full sun for deepest foliage colour and is hardy down to -15 degrees Celsius (5 degrees Fahrenheit). It is a popular ornamental plant, grown for its prolific clusters of flowers and (in the case of the pink flowering variety) deeply coloured foliage that may contain various green, copper, purple and red tones. The leaves, flowers and roots of L. chinense (Chinese: 檵木; pinyin: jìmù) are all used in traditional Chinese medicine.

== Cultivars ==
Two forms of L. chinense exist; a white- (to pale-yellow-) flowering green-leafed variety and a pink-flowering variety with leaves varying from bronze-red when new to olive-green or burgundy when mature, depending on selection and growing conditions.

== Cultivar List ==
- Loropetalum chinense 'Pizazz'
- Loropetalum chinense 'Rubrum'
- Loropetalum chinense 'Ruby'
- Loropetalum chinense var. rubrum 'Blush'
- Loropetalum chinense var. rubrum 'Burgundy'
- Loropetalum chinense var. rubrum 'Fire Dance'
- Loropetalum chinense var. rubrum 'Hines Purpleleaf'
- Loropetalum chinense var. rubrum 'Purple Majesty'
- Loropetalum chinense var. rubrum 'Raspberry Fringe'
- Loropetalum chinense var. rubrum 'Razzle-Dazzle'
- Loropetalum chinense var. rubrum 'Zhuzhou Fuchsia'
- Loropetalum chinense Black Pearl (PBR)
- Loropetalum chinense 'Chang Nian Hong'
- Loropetalum chinense 'China Pink'
- Loropetalum chinense 'Emerald Snow'
- Loropetalum chinense Ever Red
- Loropetalum chinense 'Griffcrl'
- Loropetalum chinense Hot Spice
- Loropetalum chinense 'Ming Dynasty'
- Loropetalum chinense 'Nci 002'
- Loropetalum chinense 'Rose Blush'
- Loropetalum chinense 'Snowdance'
- Loropetalum chinense 'Song'
- Loropetalum chinense 'Tang Dynasty'
- Loropetalum chinense var. rubrum 'Fire Glow'
- Loropetalum chinense var. rubrum 'Monraz'
- Loropetalum chinense var. rubrum 'Pearl'(PBR)
- Loropetalum chinense var. rubrum 'Pipa's Red'
- Loropetalum chinense var. rubrum 'Daybreak's Flame'
- Loropetalum chinense 'Dazzle'
- Loropetalum chinense 'Peack'
- Loropetalum chinense var. rubrum 'Purple Pixie'
- Loropetalum chinense var. rubrum 'Shang-hi'
- Loropetalum chinense var. rubrum 'Shang-lo'
- Loropetalum chinense ‘Shang-Red’

== Gallery ==
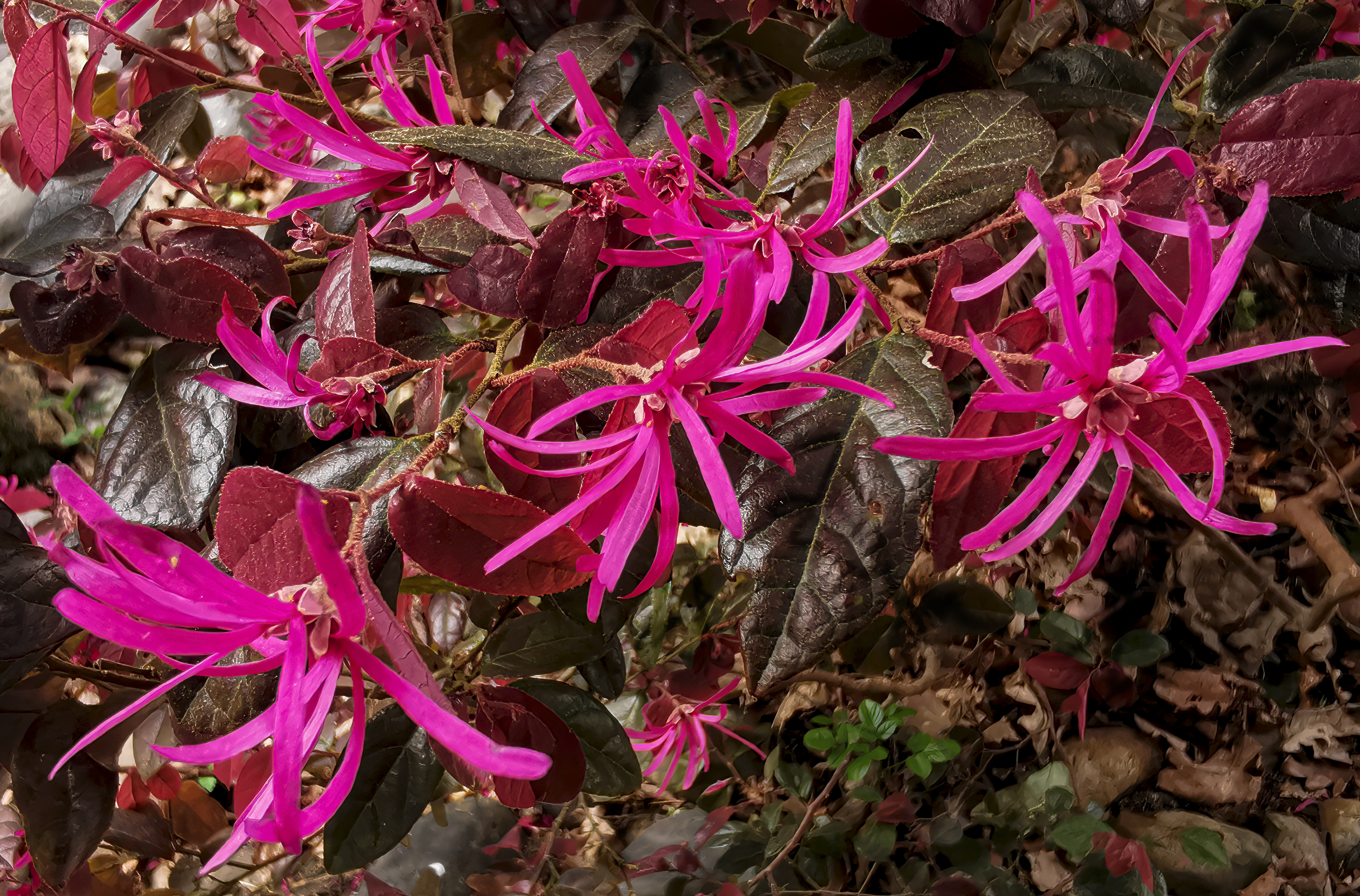
Chinese fringe flower (Loropetalum chinense)

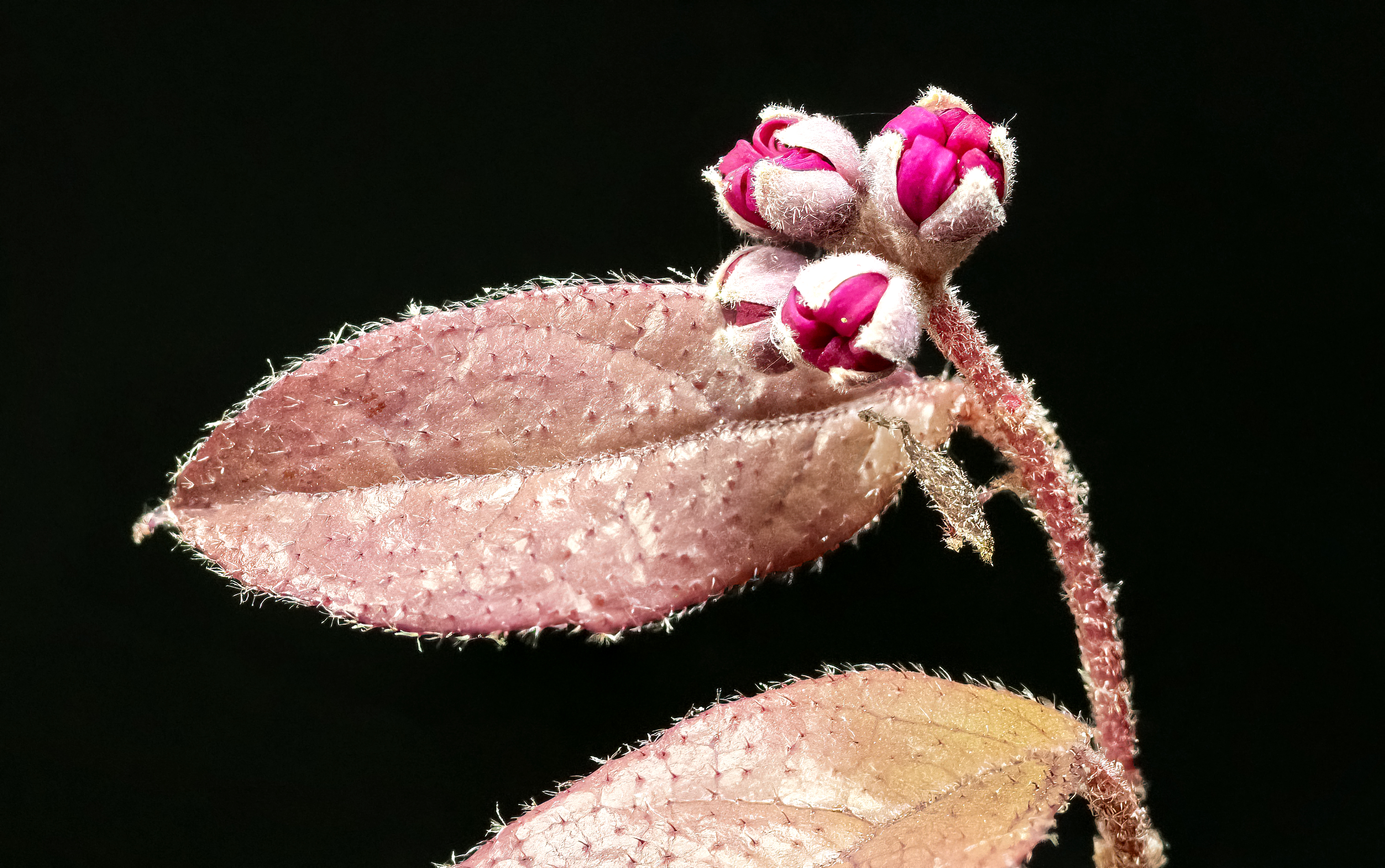
L. chinense var. rubrum leaves and buds

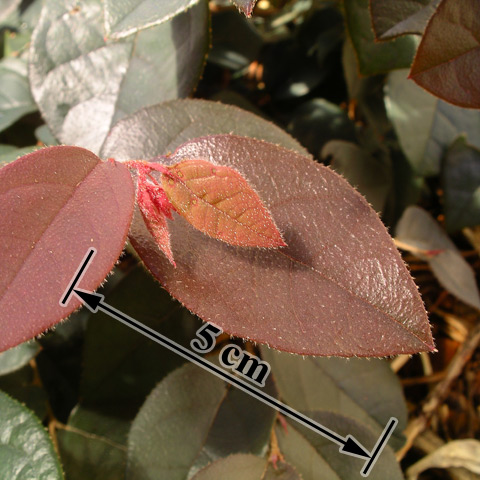
L. chinense var. rubrum leaves

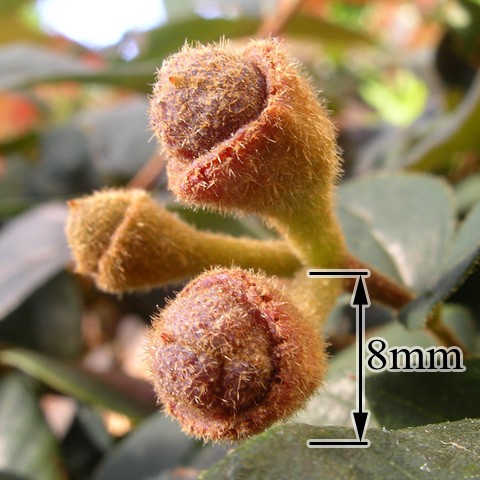
L. chinense var. rubrum fruit

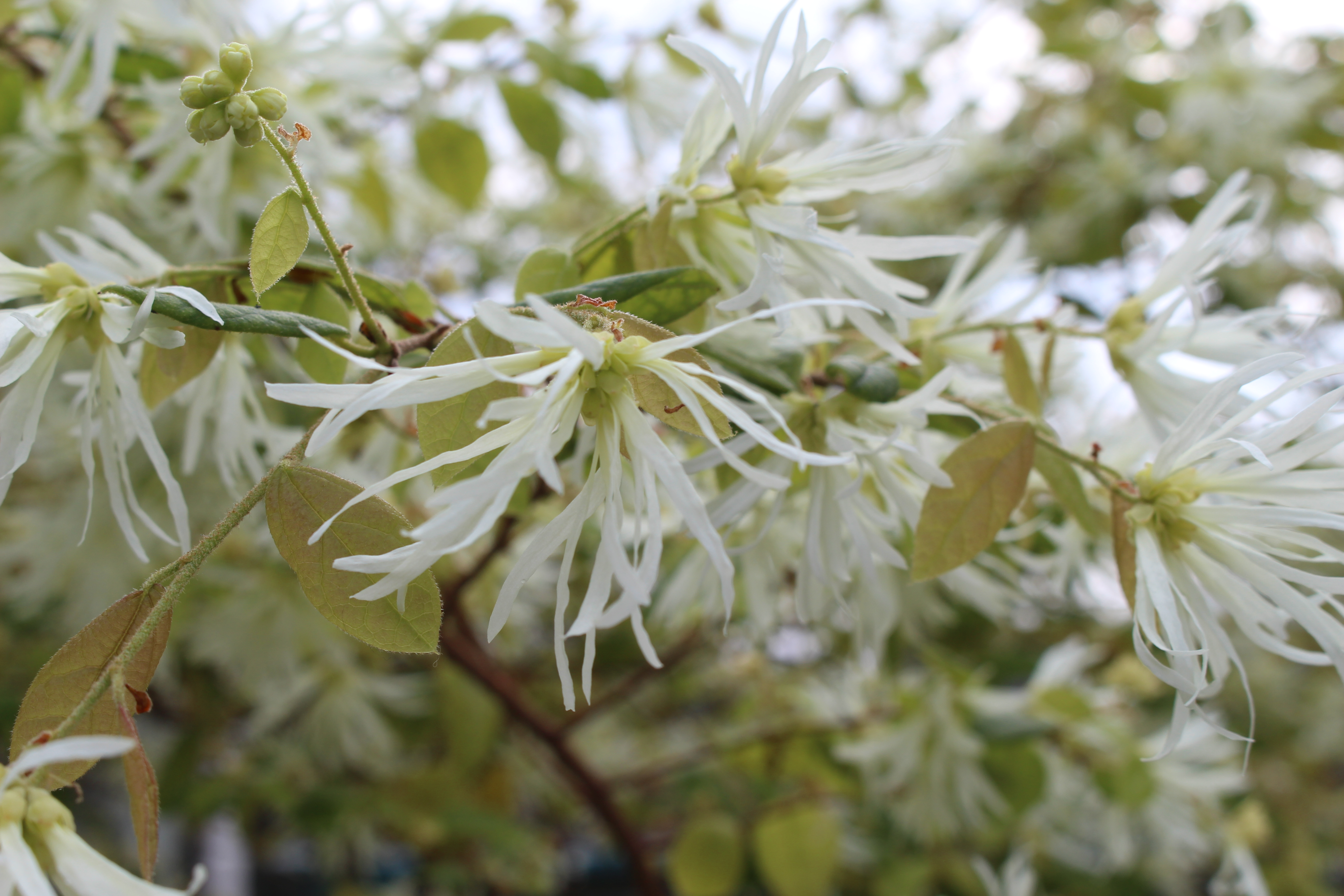
The white-flowering, green-leaved variety
