= Climbing hydrangea =

Climbing hydrangea is a common name for several species in the genus Hydrangea, and also of related species in other genera:

- Decumaria barbara
- Hydrangea anomala
- Hydrangea hydrangeoides
- Hydrangea petiolaris
- Pileostegia viburnoides

== See also ==
- Hydrangea serratifolia a climbing species from Chile
