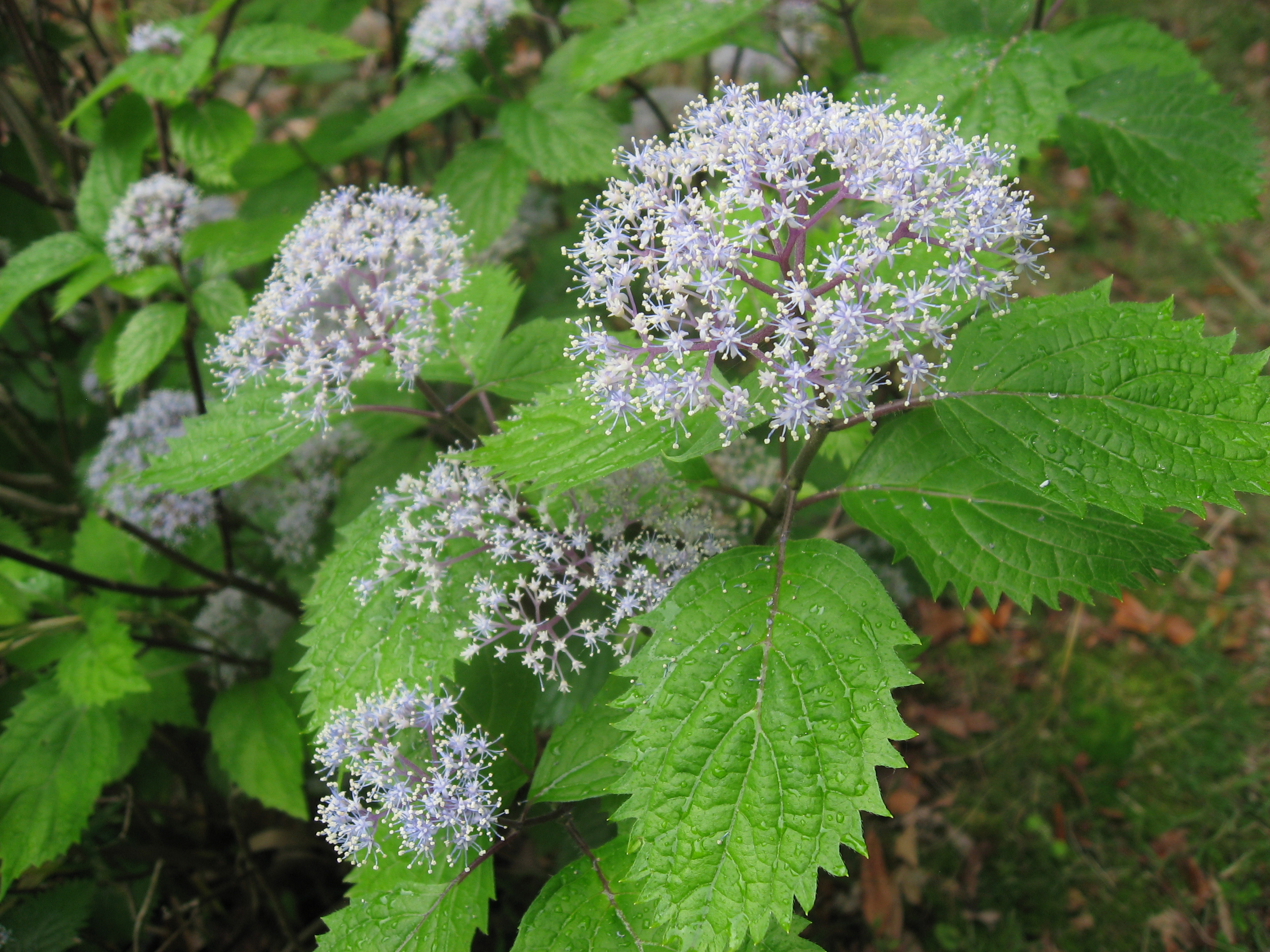

Scientific classification
- Kingdom: Plantae
- Clade: Tracheophytes
- Clade: Angiosperms
- Clade: Eudicots
- Clade: Asterids
- Order: Cornales
- Family: Hydrangeaceae
- Genus: Hydrangea
- Species: H. hirta

Binomial name
- Hydrangea hirta (Thunb.) Siebold

Synonyms
- Hydrangea hirta f. albiflora; Hydrangea hirta f. lamalis; Hydrangea hirta var. albiflora.

= Hydrangea hirta =

Species of flowering plant

Hydrangea hirta, also known as the nettle-leaved hydrangea, is a species of flowering plant in the family Hydrangeaceae that is native to East Asia. Due to the beauty and sturdiness of the species' flowers it can be found outside of its range being used for horticultural and landscaping purposes, and is found in gardens in countries including the United Kingdom and the United States.

== Taxonomy ==
Hydrangea is Greek in origin, and comes from Greek hydro meaning "water" and angeion meaning "vessel" describing to the shape of the cup shaped fruit and the capsule the fruit is contained in. The hirta portion of this species name means "hairy". Another name for this species is Hortensia hirta. Hortensia is a Latinised version of the French given name Hortense, referring to the wife of Jean-André Lepaute. In Japan the name for this species is ko-ajisai meaning small hydrangea.

Natural hybrids between hydrangea species are rare, but these have been found in the Izu Peninsula of Japan between Hydrangea hirta and H. scadens.

== Description ==
A small deciduous shrub reaching 3 to 4 ft (0.9 to 1.2 m) in height. The shrub grows numerous stems from the base, with a canopy consisting of a single uniform layer. The leaves on this shrub are deep toothed, and are covered in hairs. Hydrangea hirta has alternating leaves that are 5 to 8 cm (2.0 to 3.1 in) long with an ovate shape that end in a pointed tip. Yellowing and dropping of the leaves commences in August. As the branches become older, the initially hairy branches become glabrous due to the loss of the hairs.

The flowers of this shrub grow in small clusters that are light blue to white in color. An individual flower of this species measures 5 mm in diameter with 5 petals and 10 stamens; this species lacks the ornamental bracts that many other hydrangea species possess. Each flower is fertile. The flower clusters contain a central stem bearing a single terminal flower that develops first, the other flowers in the cluster developing as terminal buds of lateral stems. The fruit contains urceolate seeds which swell in the middle and narrow at the top.

== Distribution ==
This shrub is native to the mountain ranges of Japan, and extends from the Himalayas through China to Taiwan.

== Ecology ==
In Japan Hydrangea hirta is located in a belt of montane cool-temperate rainforest. This rainforest belt had a range of 1,200 meters in elevation in Kyushu, at 1,000–1,800 m (3,300–5,900 ft) in Shikoku, 800–1,650 m (2,600–5,400 ft) in Chūbu and the lowlands of south Hokkaido. An example of where this species grows is in the Tsuga sieboldii forest that covers the Pacific side of Honshu and Shikoku where this shrub composes 20–40% shrub cover.

Hydrangea hirta is a slow growing deciduous species that prefers podosolic soils that are acidic, heavily leached, and moist, with temperate climate conditions. This species is shade tolerant and prefers areas of light shade with partial or full shade. This species is pollinated by bees. The blooming season starts in June or late spring and ends in the early summer. Bee pollination is not the only way this species reproduces, another form of reproduction includes the ability to form new plants from buried aerial stems that will eventually break off and make new plants. Cuttings can also be made from woody stems, semi-woody stems, and softwood stems.

== Uses ==
This species is used in horticulture, gardening and landscaping. Seeds for this species can be purchased. In the European countries that this species can be found in it is notably susceptible to honey fungus. The leaves of this species have been said to be edible after they have been cooked.
