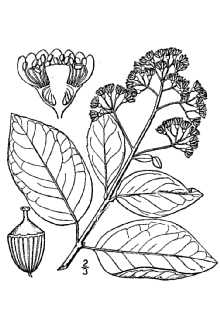

Scientific classification
- Kingdom: Plantae
- Clade: Tracheophytes
- Clade: Angiosperms
- Clade: Eudicots
- Clade: Asterids
- Order: Cornales
- Family: Hydrangeaceae
- Subfamily: Hydrangeoideae
- Tribe: Hydrangeeae
- Genus: Decumaria; L.

Species
- Decumaria barbara Decumaria sinensis

= Decumaria =

Woodvamp

Genus of plants

Decumaria, the woodvamps, is a genus of two species of flowering plants in the family Hydrangeaceae, one (D. barbara) native to the southeastern United States, and the other (D. sinensis) native to central China.

They are shrubby lianas growing to 4–10 m high through shrubs and trees, climbing by means of aerial adhesive rootlets. The leaves are variably deciduous to evergreen (with D. barbara tending to be more often deciduous, D. sinensis more evergreen), 3–10 cm long, ovate with an acute apex, and a smooth to obscurely toothed margin. The flowers are 5–10 mm diameter, white to creamy colored, fragrant, produced in dense panicles 3–8 cm broad. The fruit is a dry capsule containing several seeds.

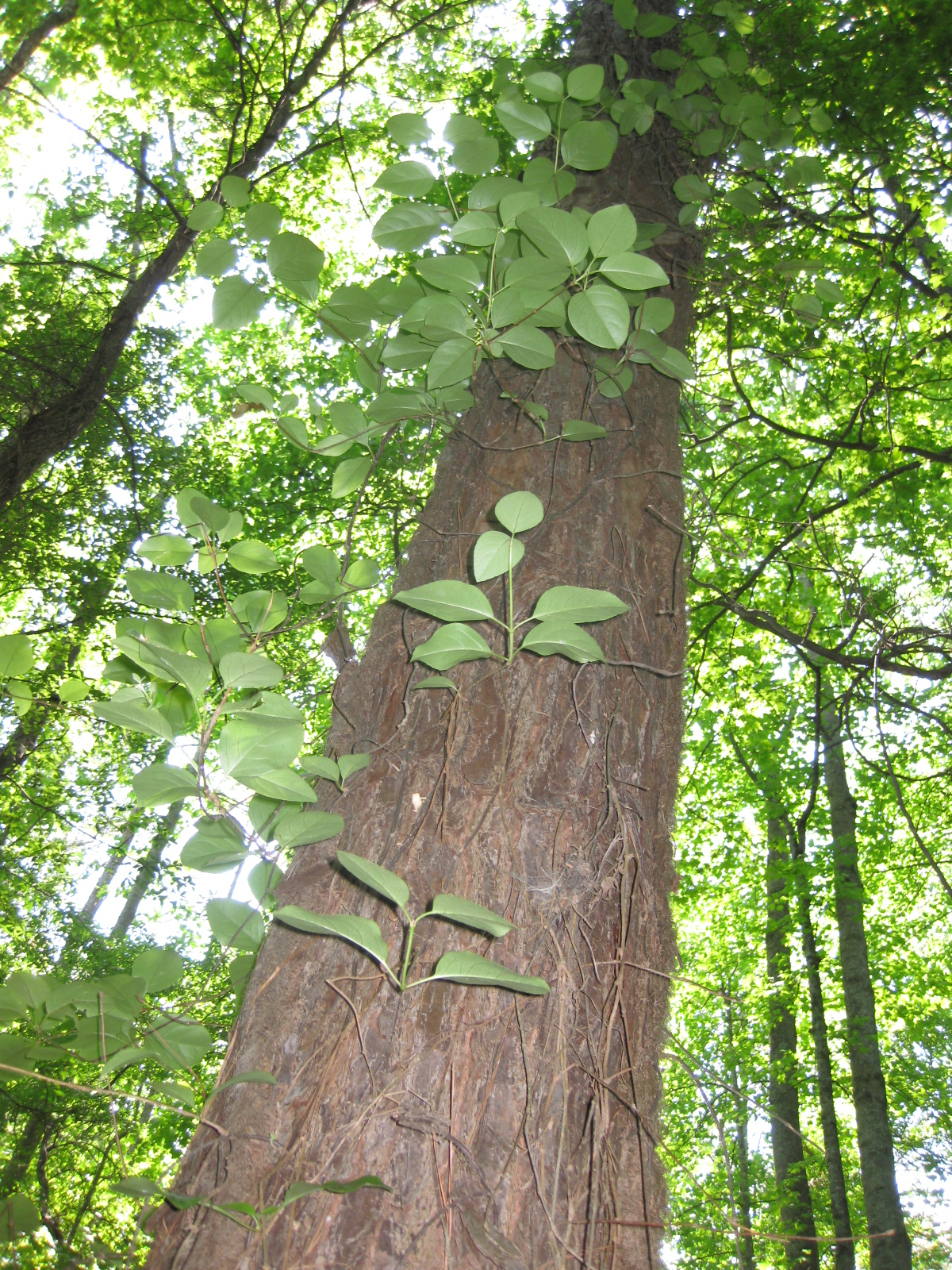
Decumaria barbara

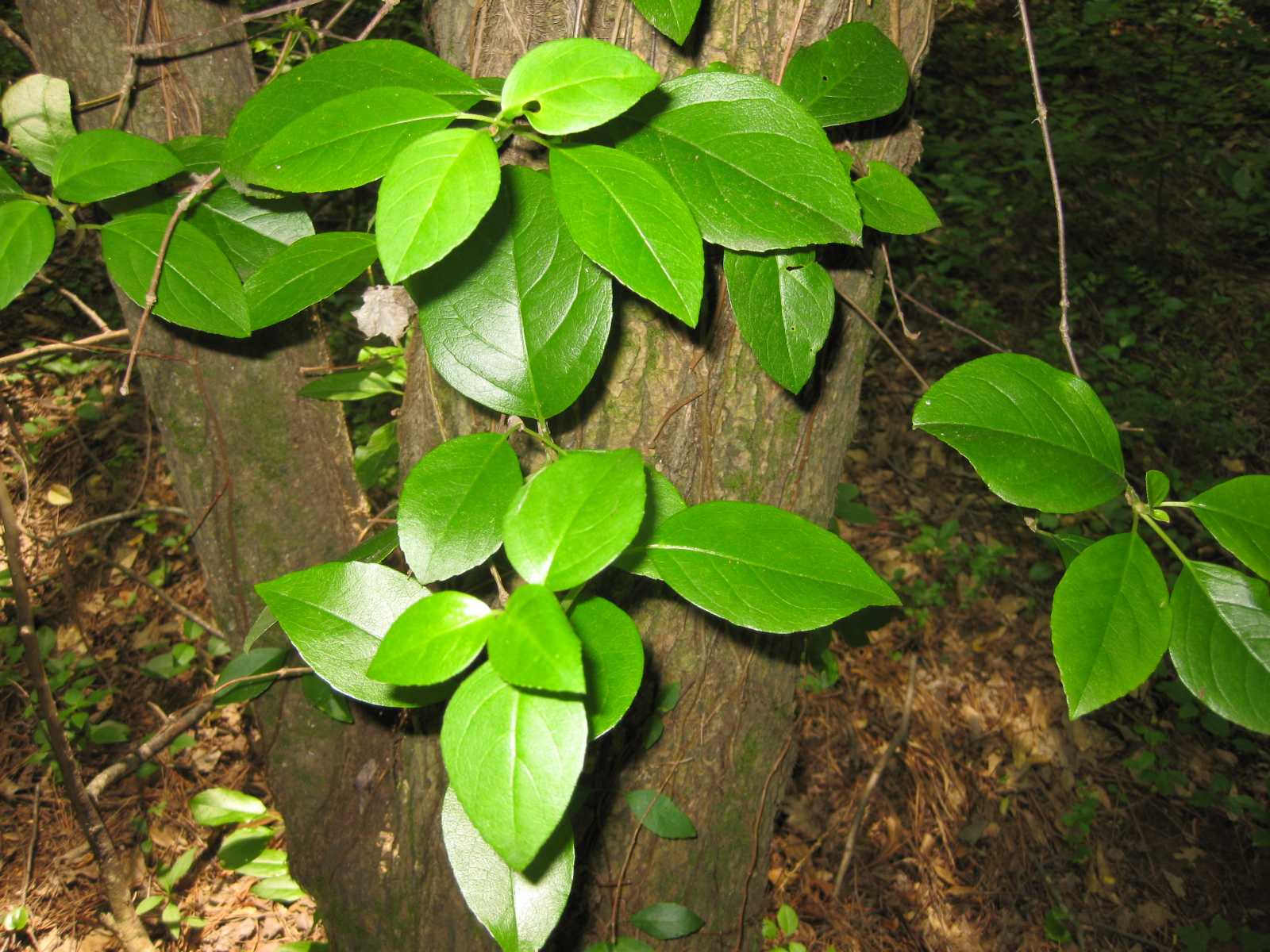
Decumaria barbara
