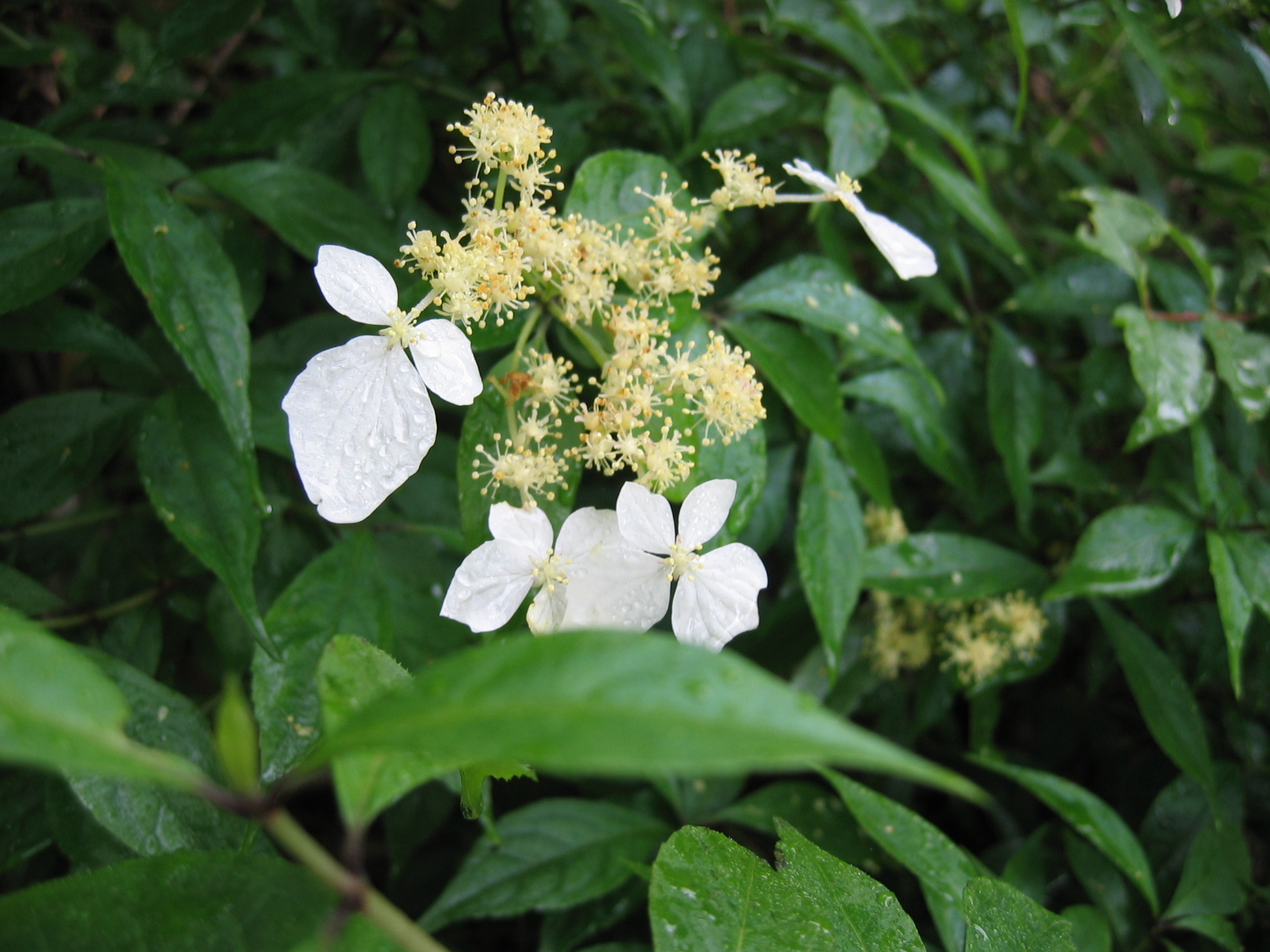

Scientific classification
- Kingdom: Plantae
- Clade: Tracheophytes
- Clade: Angiosperms
- Clade: Eudicots
- Clade: Asterids
- Order: Cornales
- Family: Hydrangeaceae
- Genus: Hydrangea
- Species: H. scandens

Binomial name
- Hydrangea scandens Maxim.

= Hydrangea scandens =

Species of flowering plant

Hydrangea scandens is a species of shrub in the flowering plant family Hydrangeaceae. It is native to Japan, where it is found from the Kantō region southward.

Its leaves are 4–7 cm (1.6–2.8 in) long, toothed, and have acuminate tips. Flowers are produced in May through June.

It is sometimes considered to be a subspecies of Hydrangea anomala, under synonymy with Hydrangea petiolaris.
