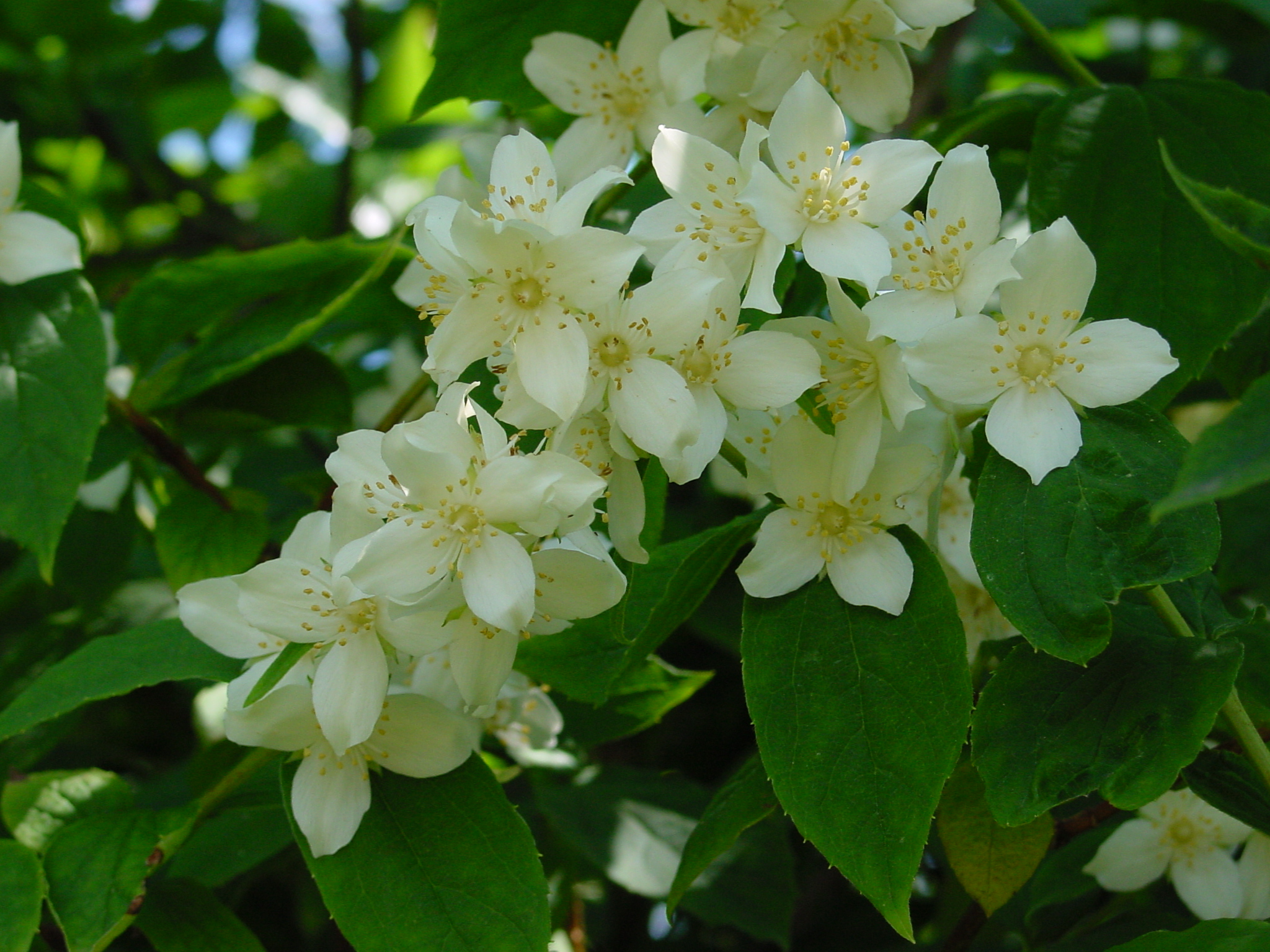
- Philadelphus coronarius

Scientific classification
- Kingdom: Plantae
- Clade: Tracheophytes
- Clade: Angiosperms
- Clade: Eudicots
- Clade: Asterids
- Order: Cornales
- Family: Hydrangeaceae
- Subfamily: Hydrangeoideae; Burnett

Type genus
- Hydrangea

Tribes
- Hydrangeeae DC. Philadelpheae DC. ex Duby

Synonyms
- Kirengeshomoideae Engl. Philadelphoideae Burnett

= Hydrangeoideae =

Subfamily of plants

Hydrangeoideae is a subfamily of the hydrangea family (Hydrangeaceae). It contains two tribes, Hydrangeeae and Philadelpheae. The subfamily was described by Gilbert Thomas Burnett in 1835. Molecular phylogenetic studies support the recognition of these two major lineages within Hydrangeoideae.

== Description ==
Pollen grains from species within the subfamily are often subprolate to subspherical. The leaf venation is largely camptodromous.

Members of Hydrangeoideae are predominantly woody plants, including shrubs, vines and small trees. Members of the wider family Hydrangeaceae generally have simple, opposite leaves and flowers that are usually bisexual. The flowers commonly have four or five petals, although floral parts can vary considerably among genera. The fruit is usually a capsule and, less commonly, a berry.

Some members of Hydrangeoideae are particularly notable for their inflorescences. In species of Hydrangea, the inflorescences may contain small fertile flowers surrounded by enlarged sterile flowers, which can be conspicuous and function in attracting pollinators. Several species are widely cultivated as ornamental plants.

== Taxonomy ==
Hydrangeeae DC.

- Broussaisia
- Cardiandra
- Decumaria
- Deinanthe
- Dichroa
- Hydrangea
- Pileostegia

Philadelpheae DC. ex Duby

- Carpenteria
- Deutzia
- Fendlerella
- Kirengeshoma
- Philadelphus
- Whipplea
