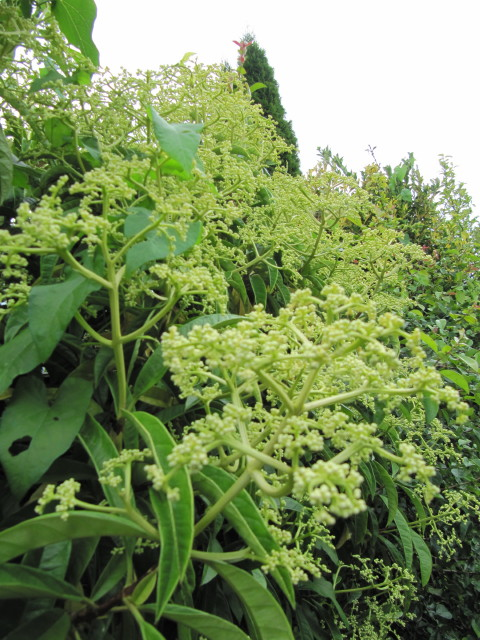

Scientific classification
- Kingdom: Plantae
- Clade: Tracheophytes
- Clade: Angiosperms
- Clade: Eudicots
- Clade: Asterids
- Order: Cornales
- Family: Hydrangeaceae
- Subfamily: Hydrangeoideae
- Tribe: Hydrangeeae
- Genus: Pileostegia; Turcz.

Species
- See text

= Pileostegia =

Genus of flowering plants

Pileostegia is a genus of 4 species of flowering plants in the family Hydrangeaceae, native to India and eastern Asia. They are evergreen climbers bearing dense clusters of creamy white flowers in late summer.

The genus name Pileostegia comes from the Greek for "cap covering", referring to the corollas.

The species known in cultivation is Pileostegia viburnoides (climbing hydrangea).
