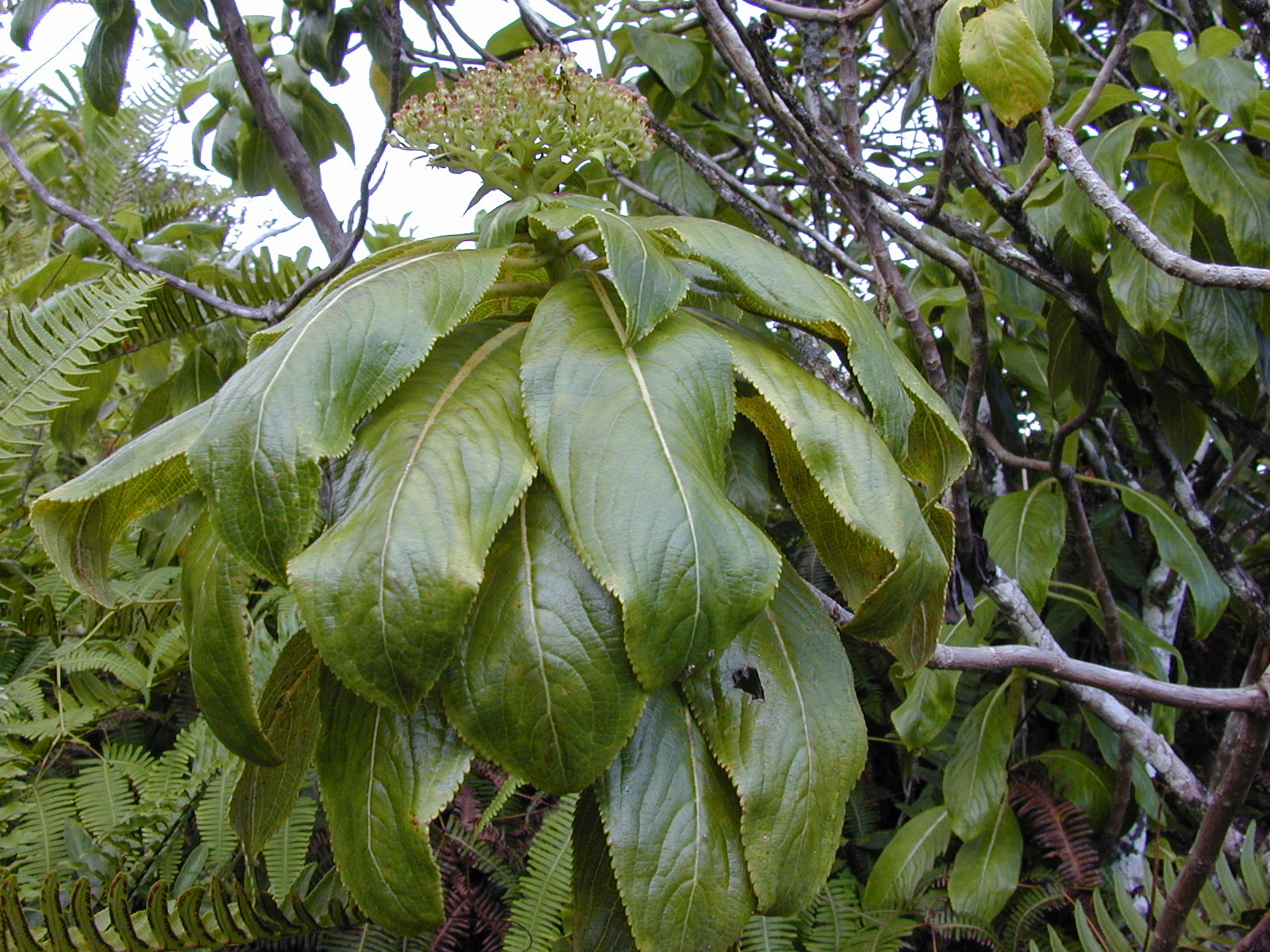

Conservation status
- Least Concern (IUCN 3.1)

- Vulnerable (NatureServe)

Scientific classification
- Kingdom: Plantae
- Clade: Tracheophytes
- Clade: Angiosperms
- Clade: Eudicots
- Clade: Asterids
- Order: Cornales
- Family: Hydrangeaceae
- Subfamily: Hydrangeoideae
- Tribe: Hydrangeeae
- Genus: Broussaisia; Gaud.
- Species: B. arguta

Binomial name
- Broussaisia arguta Gaud.

= Broussaisia =

Kanawao

Species of plant

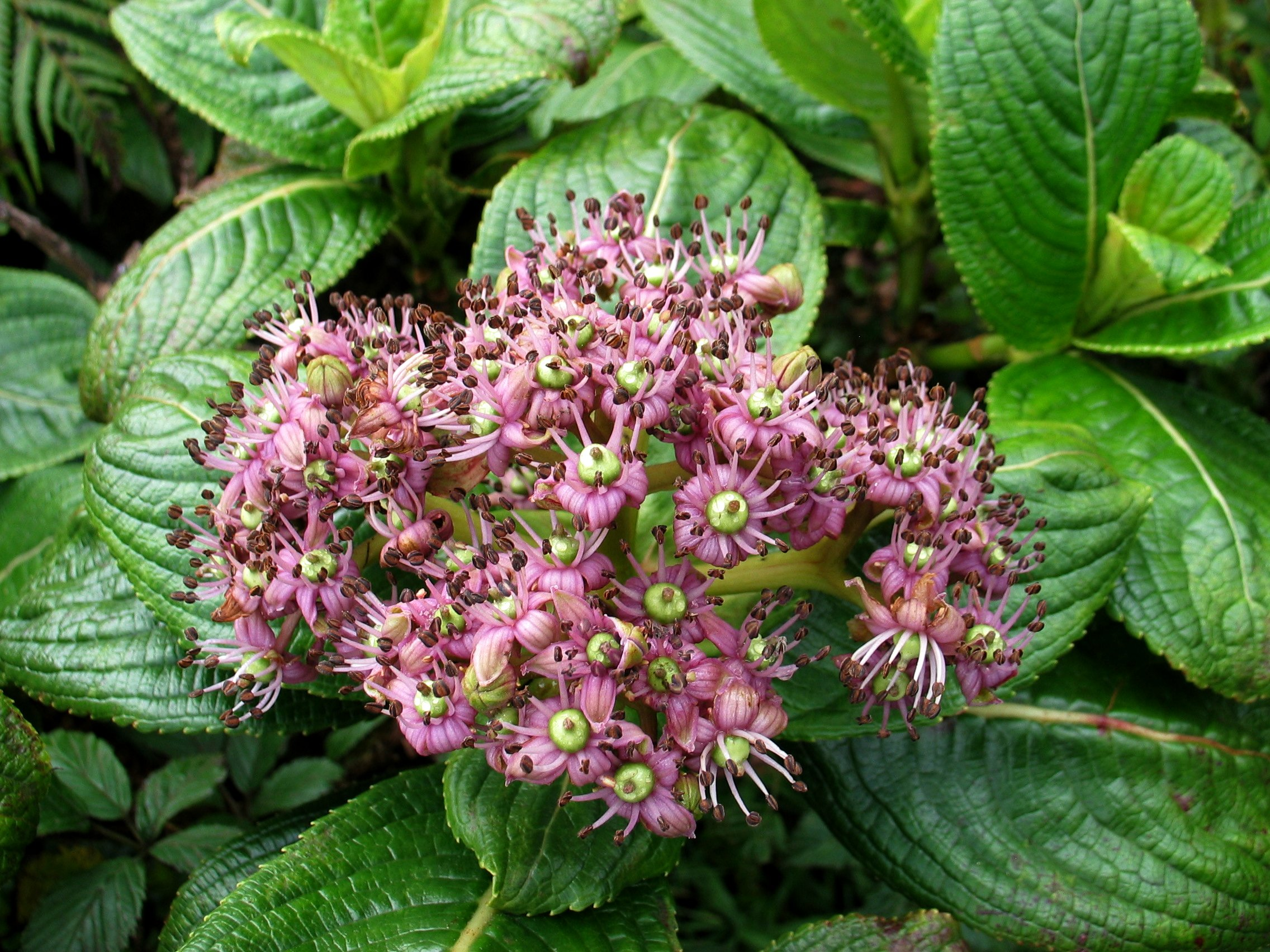
Staminate (male) flowers

Broussaisia arguta, the kanawao, is a species of perennial flowering plant in the Hydrangea family, Hydrangeaceae, that is endemic to Hawaiʻi. It is the only species in the monotypic genus Broussaisia.

== Etymology, Taxonomy and Classification ==
Broussaisia derives its name from Francois Joseph Victor Broussais, a physiologist from France. Arguta is a latin epitaph, which in biology, means “sharply toothed”, referring to the serrated margins of the leaf. Another commonly used scientific name is Hydrangea arguta.

The common Hawaiian name is Kanawao, but it is also referred to as: Puʻahaʻnui, Akiahala, Kupuwao, and Piʻohiʻa.

== Morphology ==
It is a dioecious, evergreen plant that either grows as a 1.5–3 metres (4.9–9.8 ft) shrub or a 6 metres (20 ft) tree. The obovate leaves are 10–25 centimetres (3.9–9.8 in) long and 4–9 centimetres (1.6–3.5 in) wide with finely serrated margins

The flowers are arranged in a corymb, with male flowers being slightly longer than female flowers. Fertilized female flowers develop reddish blue berries about 10 mm (0.39 in) in diameter.

== Ecology and Range ==
Kanawao is a widespread species occurring in mesic and wet forests on all of the main Hawaiian Islands, typically between 305–1,829 m (1,000–6,000 ft) elevation.

Orthotylus broussaisia (O. broussaisiae) from Kauaʻi feeds on Broussaisia arguta. Although there has been extensive research on Broussaisia arguta, only the Orthotylus broussaisiae species has been found feeding on it.

The leaves of B. arguta provides an advantageous habitat for the Hawaiian Happyface Spider as well as several species of native Hawaiian leafhoppers and several threatened species of endemic land snails. The Poʻouli, declared extinct in 2019 and whose diet consisted of primarily insects and land snails, could be found foraging on B. arguta.

== Traditional Uses ==
The flowers and fruit can be eaten. Medicinally, the fruit was traditionally used to aid in conception and in the treatment of thrush and latent childhood disease. Certain varieties could only be consumed by men, while others could only be consumed by women and children.
