= Deinanthe caerulea =

Scientific classification
- Kingdom: Plantae
- Clade: Embryophytes
- Clade: Tracheophytes
- Clade: Angiosperms
- Clade: Eudicots
- Clade: Asterids
- Order: Cornales
- Family: Hydrangeaceae
- Genus: Deinanthe
- Species: D. caerulea

Binomial name
- Deinanthe caerulea Stapf, 1911

Species of flowering plant

Deinanthe caerulea, the false hydrangea, is a species of plant from the genus Deinanthe in the family Hydrangeaceae. It was first described by Otto Stapf in 1911.

The blue false hydrangea is a perennial, herbaceous plant that reaches heights of 30 to 50 cm (12 to 20 in). It forms a rhizome. The leaves are opposite. The leaf blade is broadly elliptical, ovate, or obovate, and measures 10 to 25 cm (3.9 to 9.8 in) by 6 to 16 cm (2.4 to 6.3 in), has two columns at the top and serrated on the edge. The inflorescence consists of fertile and sterile flowers. The fertile flowers have 6 to 8 blue, lilac blue or light red petals. Stamens are numerous. The stamens and anthers are light blue.

The flowering time is in July and August.

== Occurrence ==
The blue false hydrangea occurs in China in western Hubei in damp forests at altitudes of 700 to 1,600 meters (2,300 to 5,200 ft).

== Use ==
The blue false hydrangea is rarely used as an ornamental plant for groups of trees. It needs a partially shaded, cool location with humus soil.
