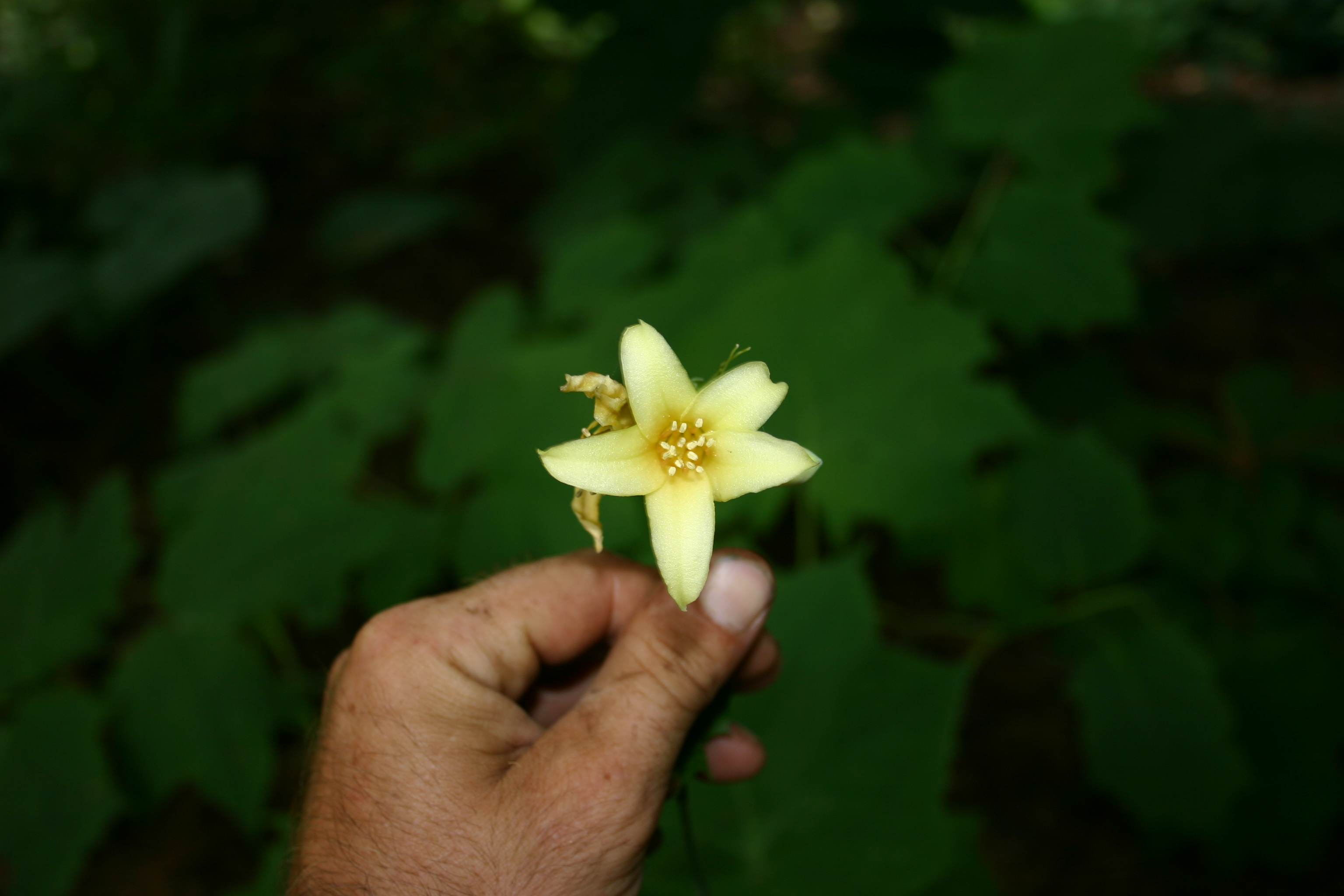
- Flower

Scientific classification
- Kingdom: Plantae
- Clade: Tracheophytes
- Clade: Angiosperms
- Clade: Eudicots
- Clade: Asterids
- Order: Cornales
- Family: Hydrangeaceae
- Genus: Kirengeshoma
- Species: K. koreana

Binomial name
- Kirengeshoma koreana Nakai

= Kirengeshoma koreana =

Korean kirengeshoma

Species of flowering plant

Kirengeshoma koreana, the Korean kirengeshoma, is a plant in the family Hydrangeaceae.

== Description ==
Kirengeshoma koreana is a herbaceous plant with opposite, simple, palmately lobed leaves, on stout, green stems. The flowers are yellow, borne in midsummer.
