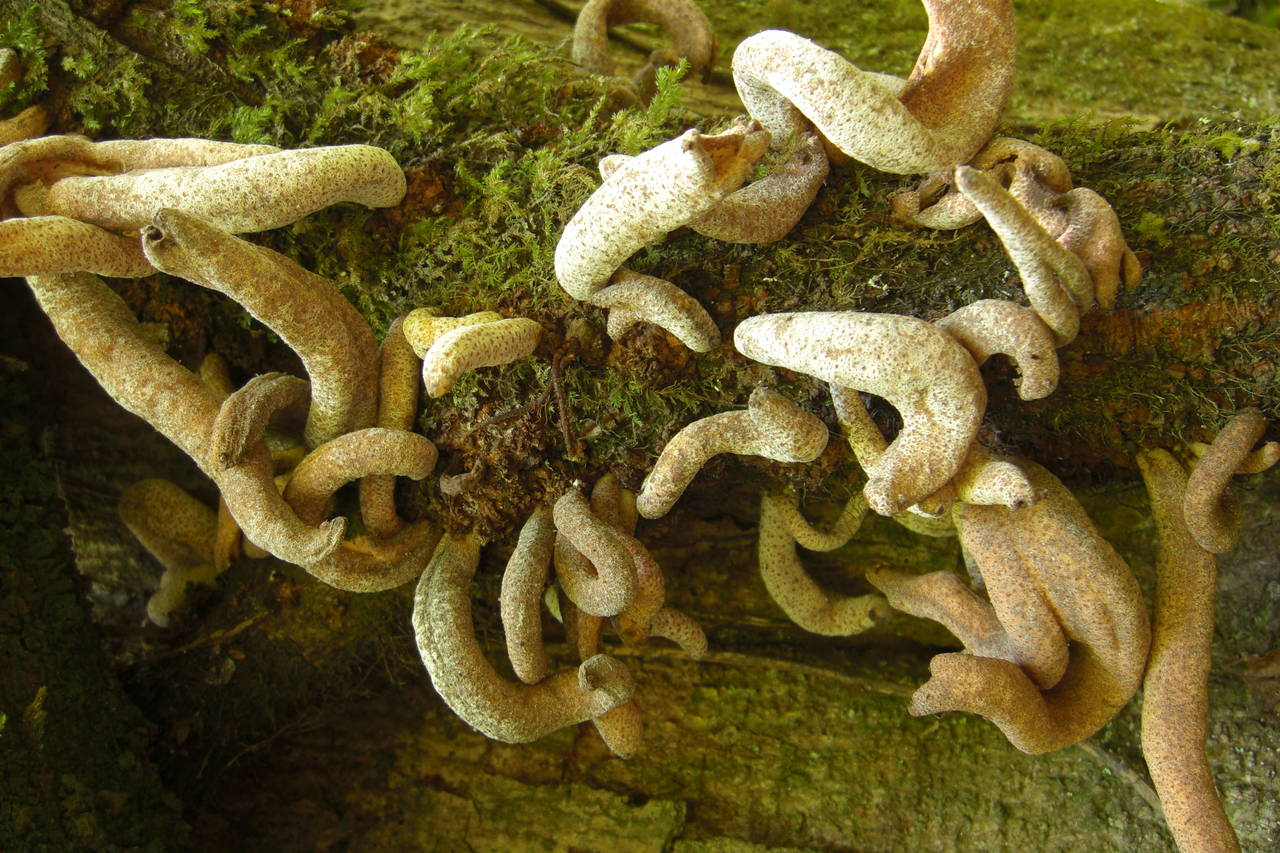
- Austrobasidium pehueldeni

Scientific classification
- Kingdom: Fungi
- Division: Basidiomycota
- Class: Exobasidiomycetes
- Order: Exobasidiales
- Family: Exobasidiaceae
- Genus: Austrobasidium; Palfner

Type species
- Austrobasidium pehueldeni Palfner

= Austrobasidium =

Genus of fungi

Austrobasidium is a genus of fungi in the Exobasidiaceae family. The genus is monotypic and contains the single species Austrobasidium pehueldeni, found parasitizing the woody plant Hydrangea serratifolia in Chile.
