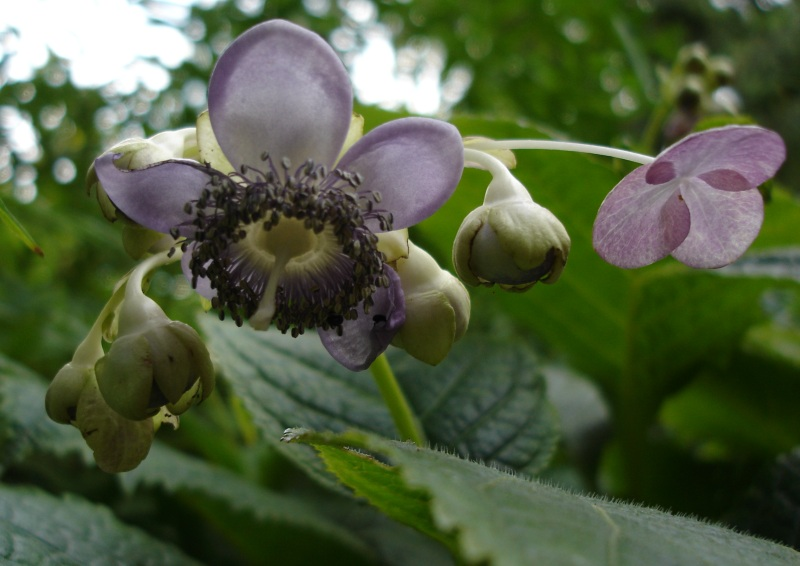
- Deinanthe caerulea

Scientific classification
- Kingdom: Plantae
- Clade: Embryophytes
- Clade: Tracheophytes
- Clade: Angiosperms
- Clade: Eudicots
- Clade: Asterids
- Order: Cornales
- Family: Hydrangeaceae
- Subfamily: Hydrangeoideae
- Tribe: Hydrangeeae
- Genus: Deinanthe; Maxim.

Species
- See text

= Deinanthe =

Genus of flowering plants

Deinanthe is a genus consisting of a few species of rare herbaceous-habit rhizomatous plants found in the mountain woodlands of East Asia, ranging from China to Japan. They are handsome clump-forming perennials good for shade, woodland and rock gardens. These attractive deciduous plants have relatively large "fishtail" leaves (cleft at the apex). Deinanthes grow at a slow rate to be bushy and shrub-like, 2 ft (0.61 m) tall and wide. The leaves attain 3 to 4 inches (76 to 102 mm) in length, being deep green, roughly textured, deep veined, cordate at their bases and with serrate margins. The shoots emerge from stout, knobby rhizomes. Leaves are easily damaged in direct sun exposure. Flowering occurs in late summer to early fall. The delicate, waxy, nodding cup-shaped flowers in rich to pale purple-blue, rose or white, are borne in loose terminal clusters. Resembling gargantuan fertile hydrangea flowers, with numerous yellowish to pale blue anthers, they are occasionally accompanied by sterile flowers, as in the lacecap hydrangeas. Roots and leaves are edible.

== Species ==
- Deinanthe bifida Maxim. (false hydrangea)
- Deinanthe caerulea
