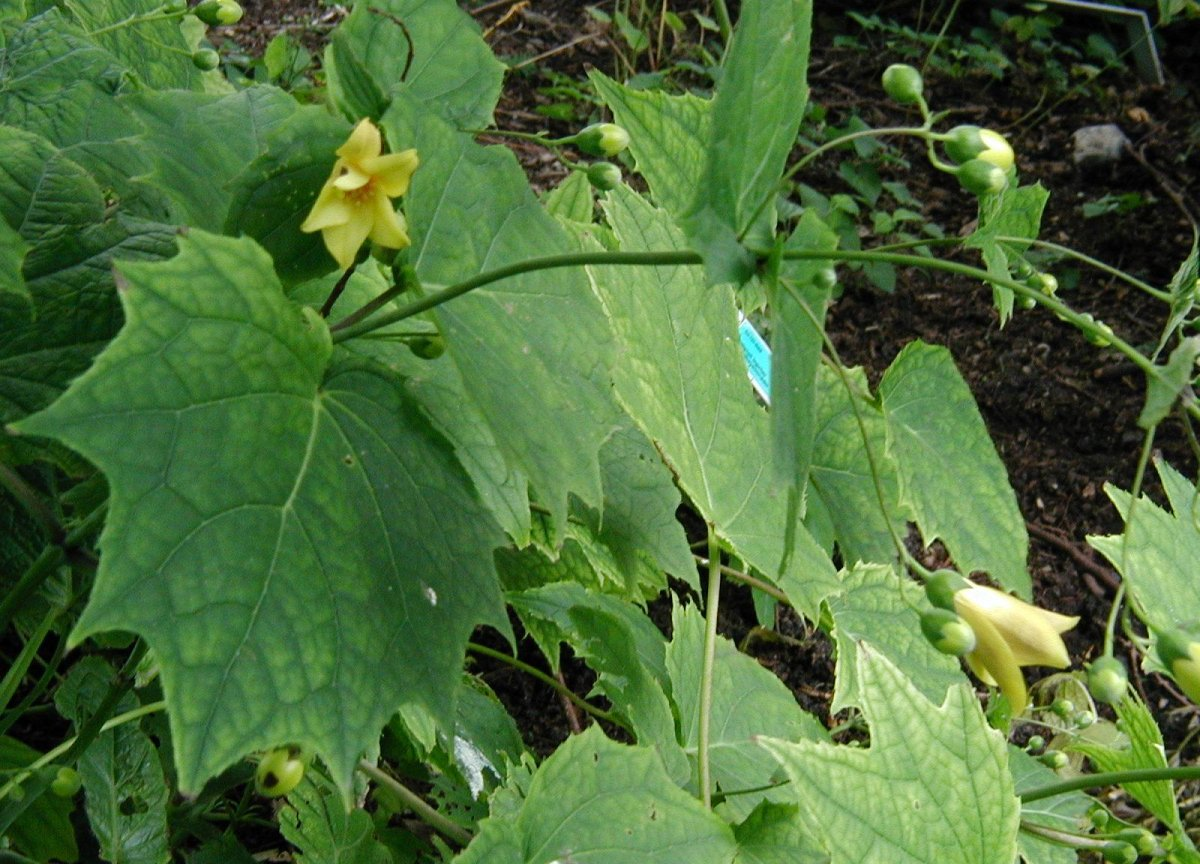
- Kirengeshoma palmata

Scientific classification
- Kingdom: Plantae
- Clade: Embryophytes
- Clade: Tracheophytes
- Clade: Spermatophytes
- Clade: Angiosperms
- Clade: Eudicots
- Clade: Asterids
- Order: Cornales
- Family: Hydrangeaceae
- Subfamily: Hydrangeoideae
- Tribe: Philadelpheae
- Genus: Kirengeshoma; Yatabe

Type species
- Kirengeshoma palmata

Species
- 2, see text

= Kirengeshoma =

Genus of flowering plants

Kirengeshoma is a genus containing two species of plants in the hydrangea family. Both are clump-forming perennials native to Eastern Asia, with sycamore-like palmate leaves and nodding, waxy yellow flowers on slender stalks, growing in shady environments. They are grown as garden plants in temperate regions of the world.

The genus name is Japanese, ki-rengeshōma (黄蓮華升麻); ki means ‘yellow’ and rengeshōma is a somewhat similar plant, the false anemone (Anemonopsis).

== Species ==
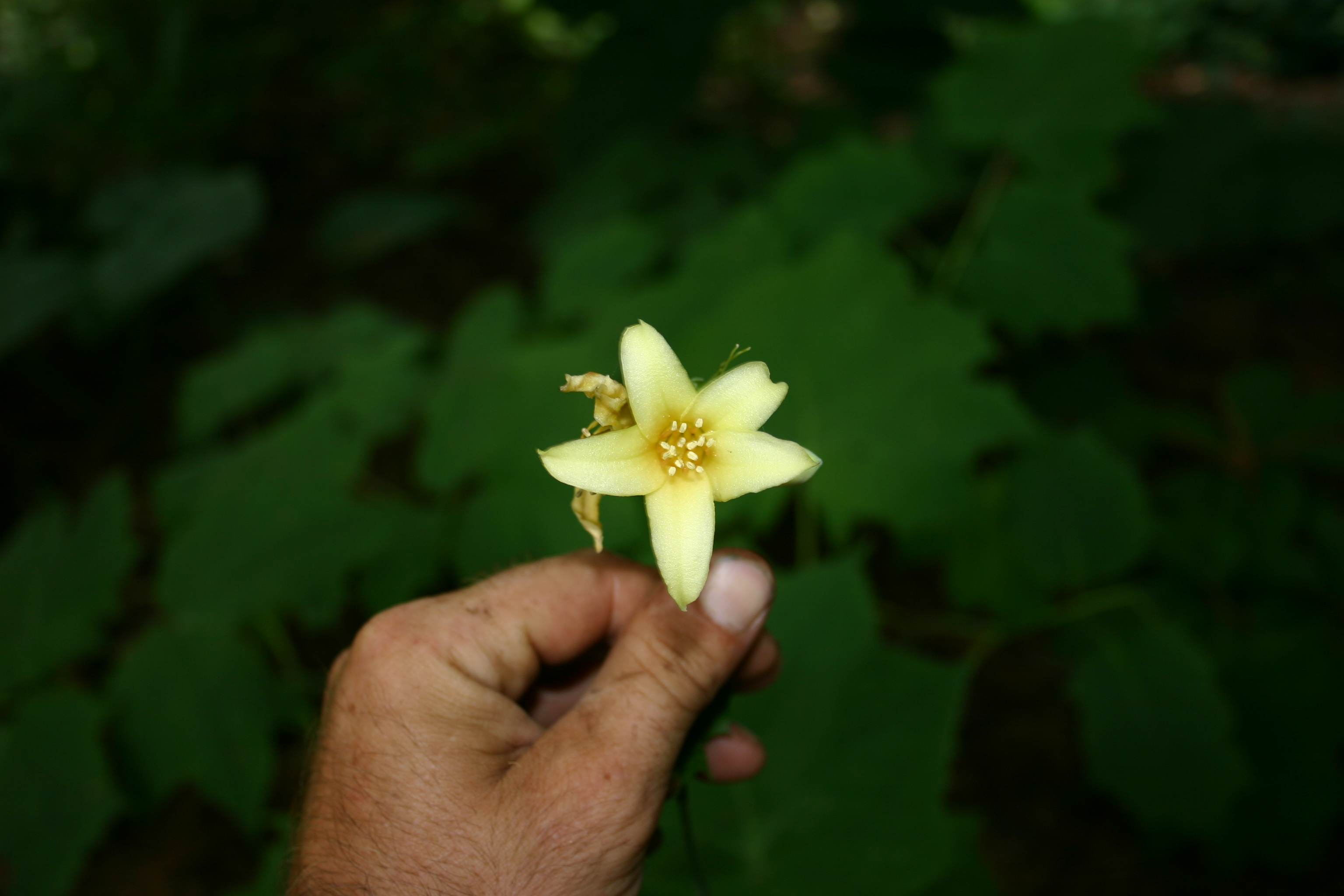
Kirengeshoma koreana

Image	Scientific name	Common name	Distribution
	Kirengeshoma koreana Nakai	Korean kirengeshoma	Korea
	Kirengeshoma palmata Yatabe	yellow waxbell	Japan and eastern China (Huangshan and Tianmushan).
