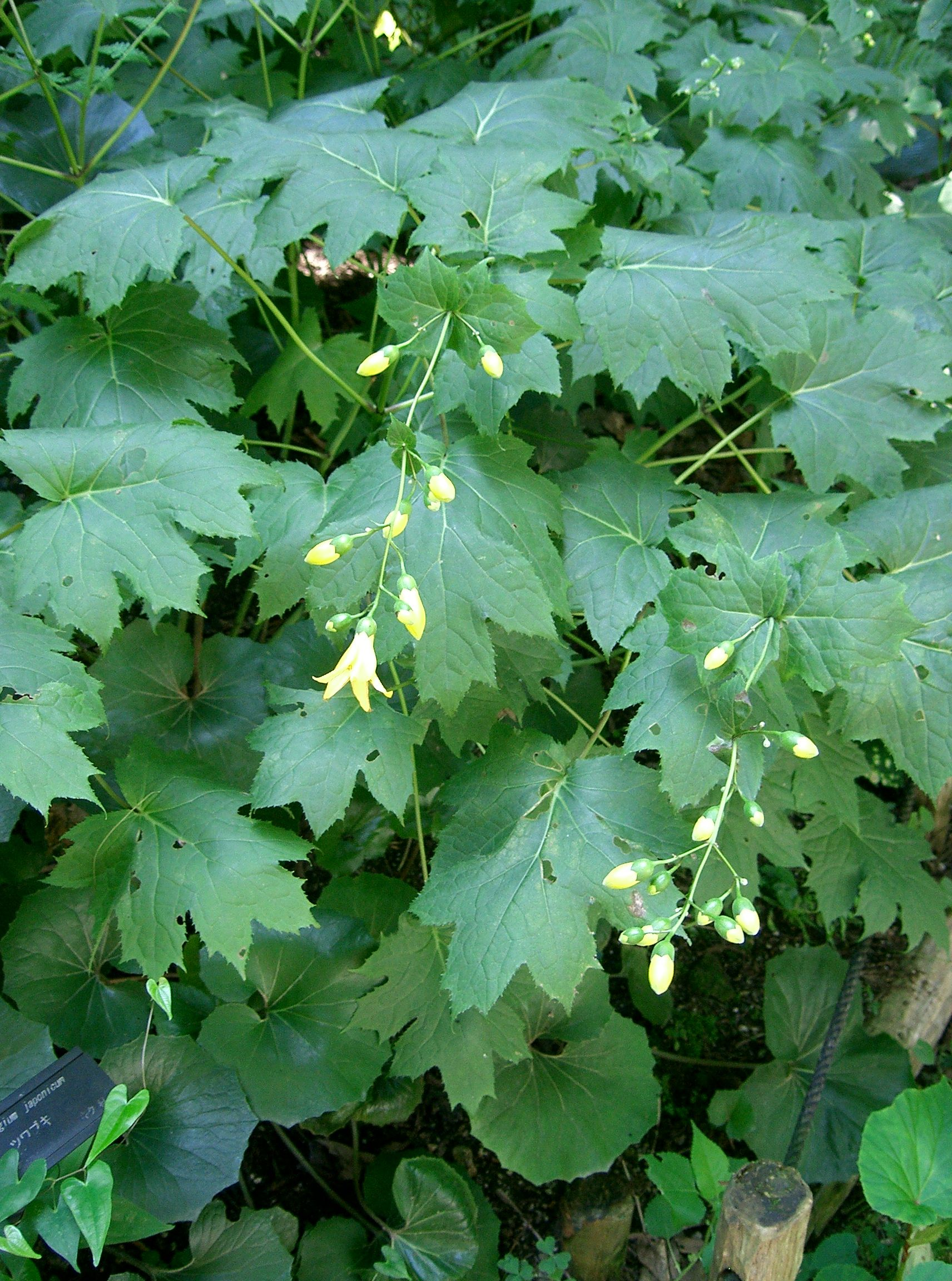

Conservation status
- Endangered (IUCN 3.1)

Scientific classification
- Kingdom: Plantae
- Clade: Tracheophytes
- Clade: Angiosperms
- Clade: Eudicots
- Clade: Asterids
- Order: Cornales
- Family: Hydrangeaceae
- Genus: Kirengeshoma
- Species: K. palmata

Binomial name
- Kirengeshoma palmata Yatabe

= Kirengeshoma palmata =

Species of flowering plant

Kirengeshoma palmata, the yellow wax-bells, is a species of flowering plant in the family Hydrangeaceae, native to Japan and eastern China (Huangshan and Tianmushan). It is a clump-forming herbaceous perennial growing to 60–120 cm (24–47 in) tall by 75 cm (30 in) broad, with sycamore-like palmate leaves, and fleshy, pale yellow flowers borne on slender maroon stems in late summer. It is a calcifuge, suitable for cultivation in a shady, moist location in acid soil.

The Koreana Group of Kirengeshoma palmata has received the Royal Horticultural Society's Award of Garden Merit.

== Gallery ==
Kirengeshoma palmata

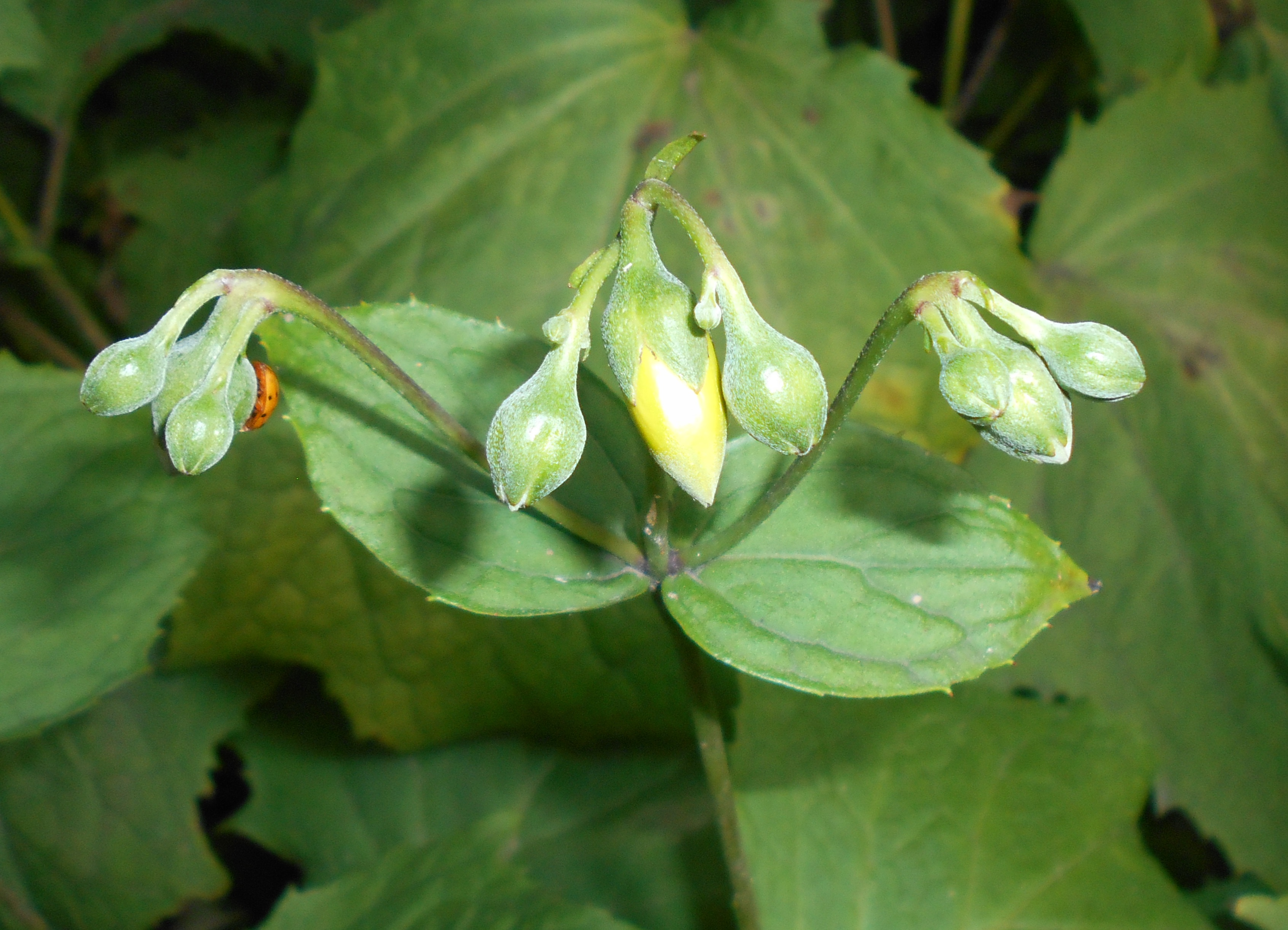
Buds

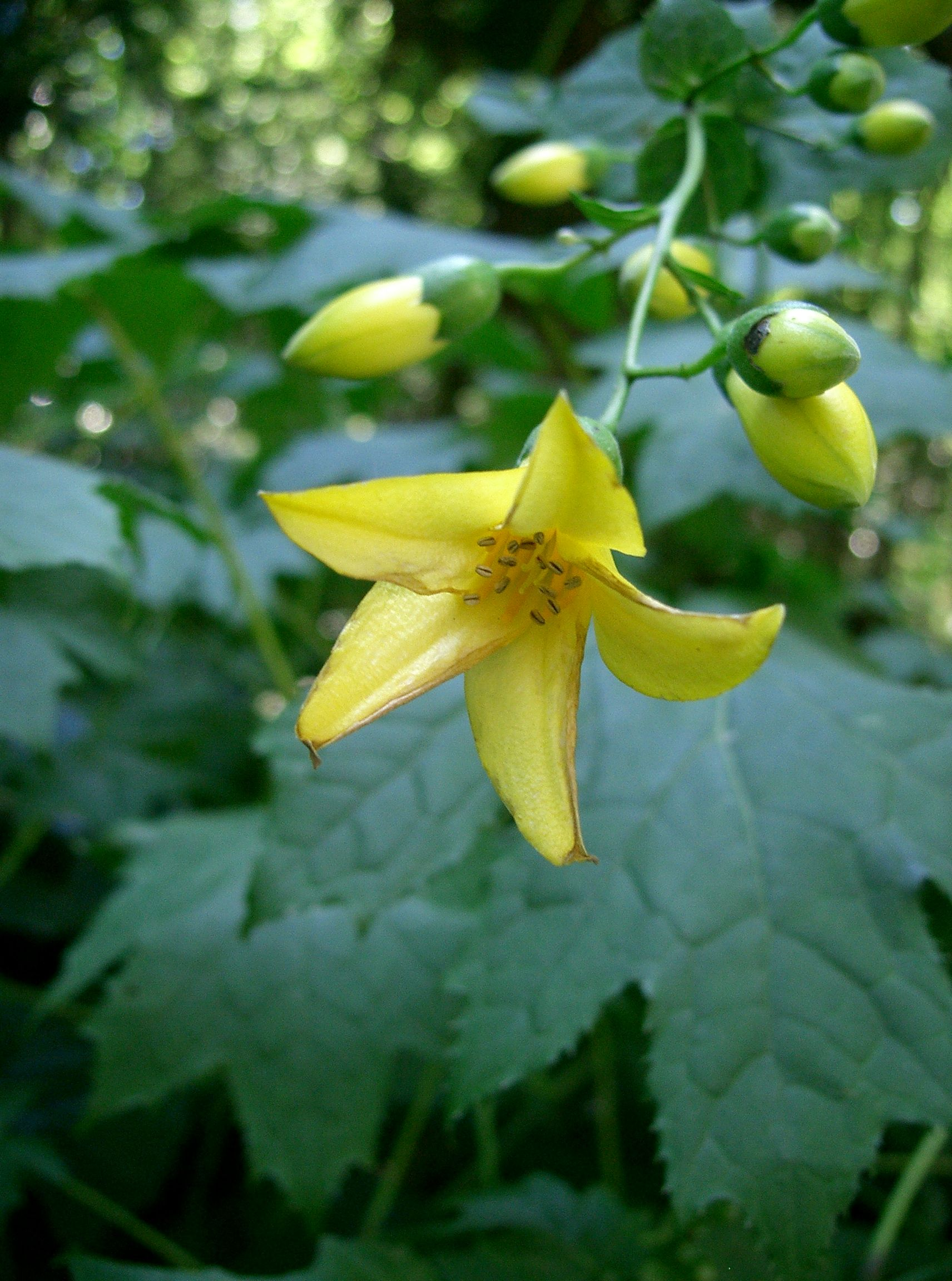
Flowers

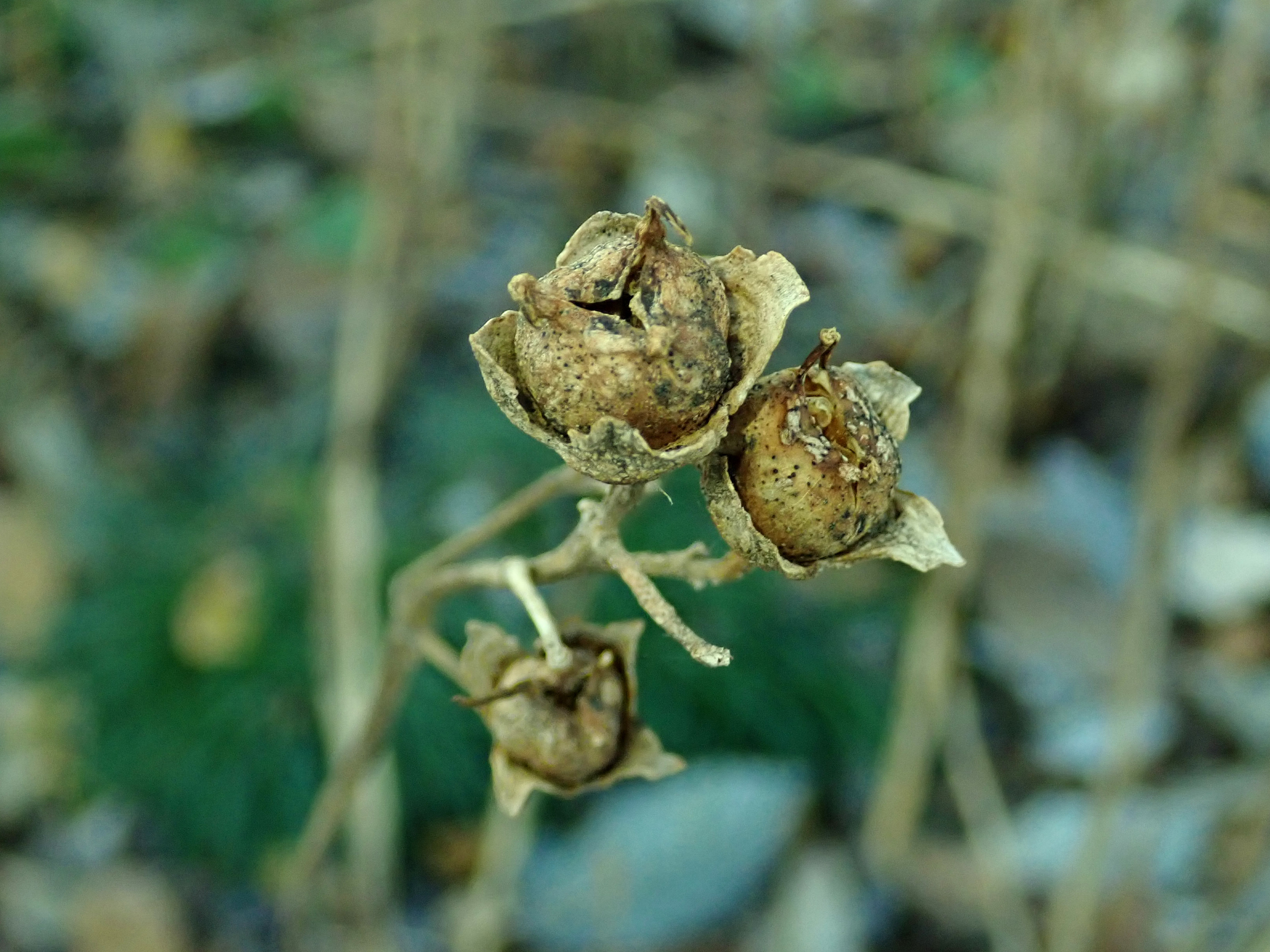
Fruits

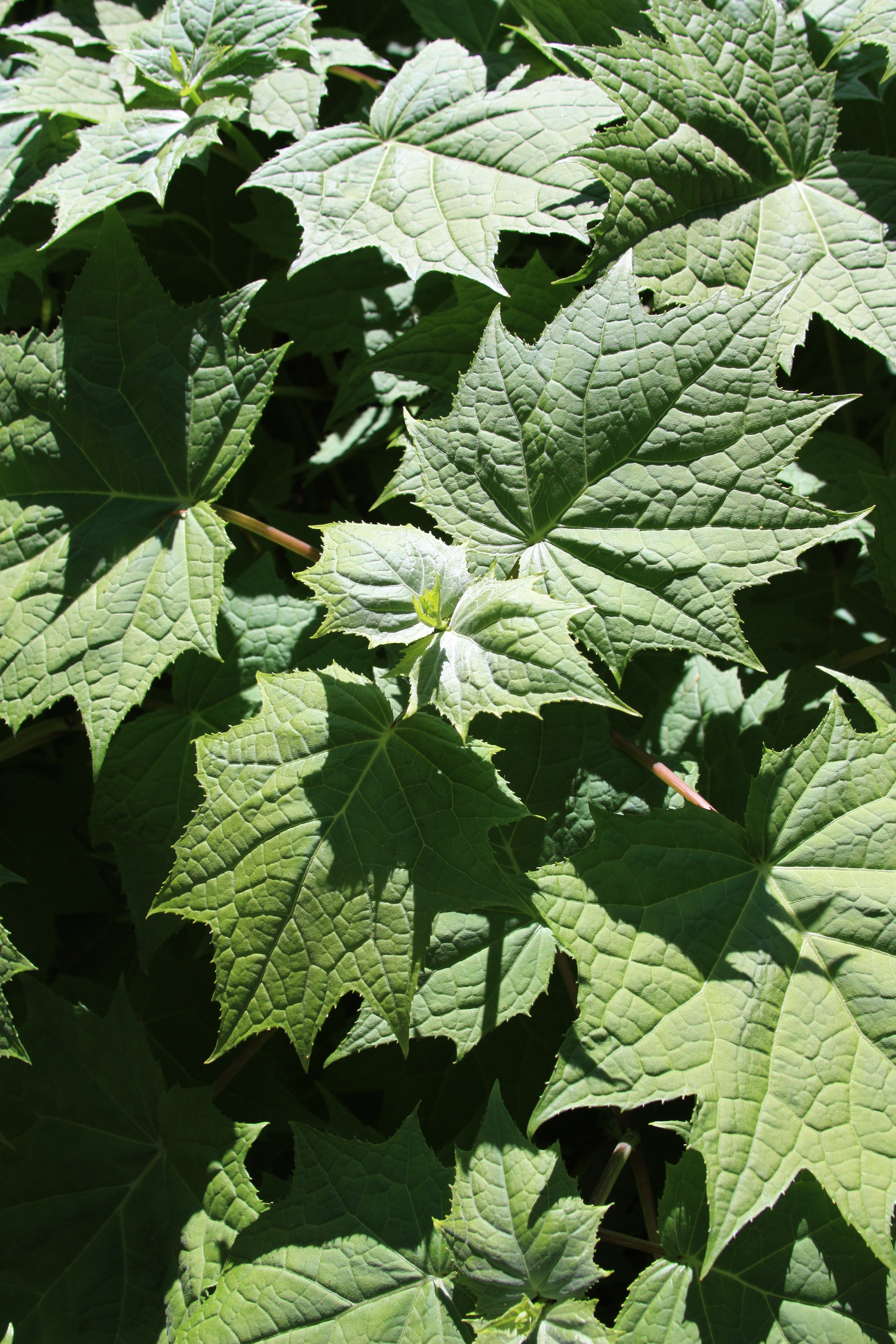
Foliage

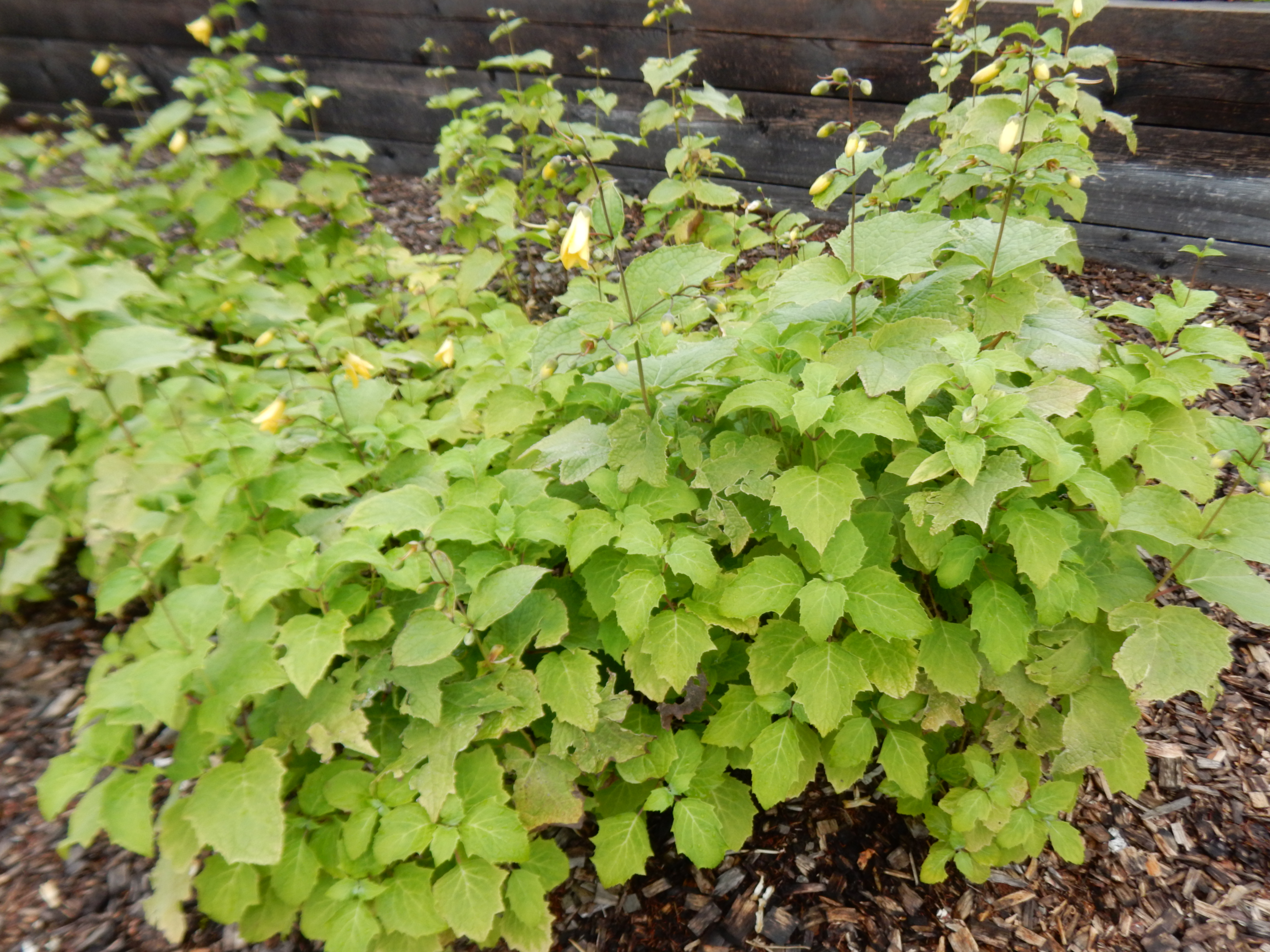
Blooming plants
