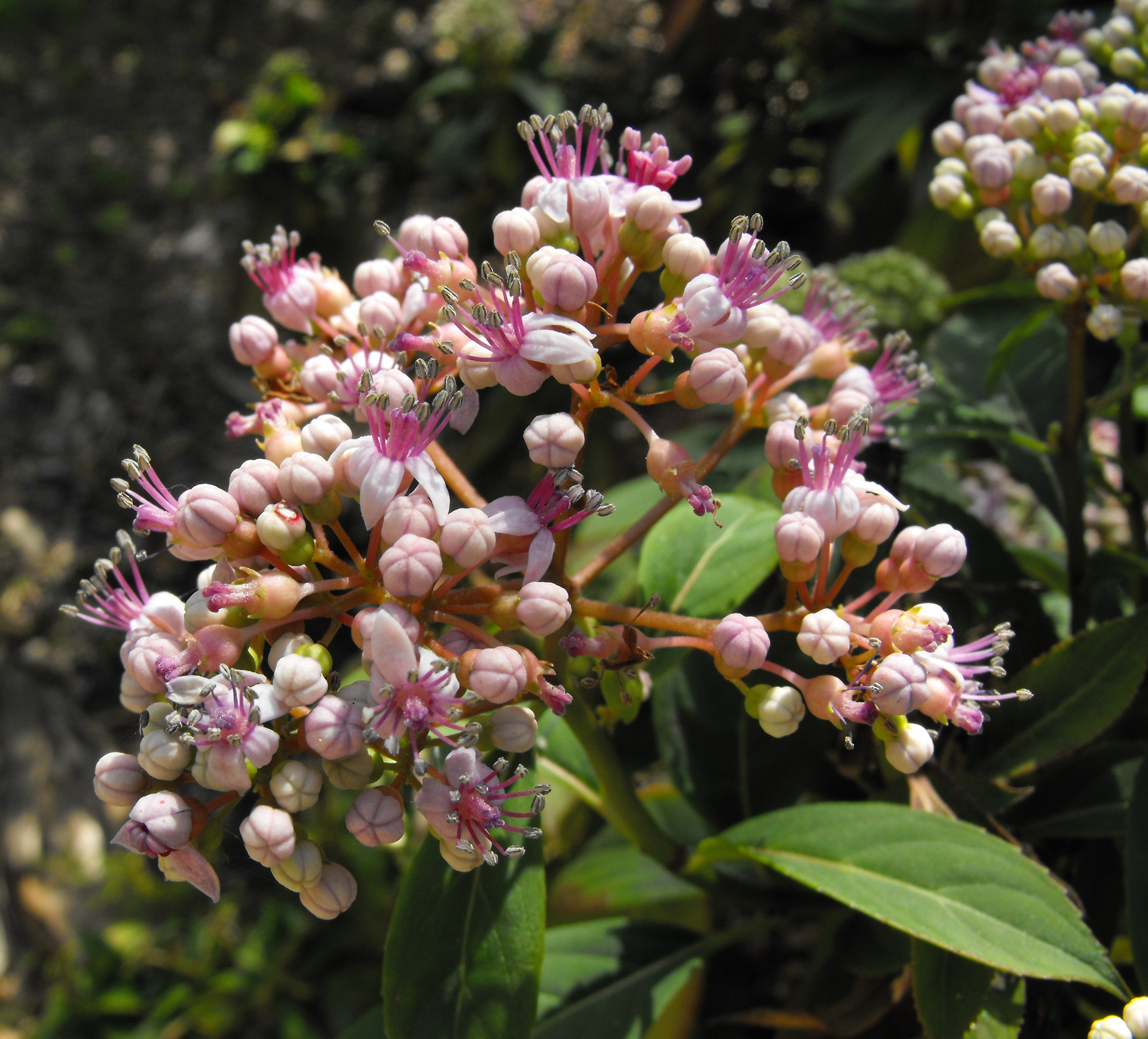
- Dichroa versicolor

Scientific classification
- Kingdom: Plantae
- Clade: Tracheophytes
- Clade: Angiosperms
- Clade: Eudicots
- Clade: Asterids
- Order: Cornales
- Family: Hydrangeaceae
- Subfamily: Hydrangeoideae
- Tribe: Hydrangeeae
- Genus: Dichroa; Lour.

Species
- See text

= Dichroa =

Genus of plants

Dichroa was a genus of 12 species of flowering plants in the family Hydrangeaceae, native to eastern and southeastern Asia. It is now included in genus Hydrangea. These are deciduous shrubs growing to 1–3 m tall, with their leaves arranged in opposite pairs. The flowers are produced in a broad inflorescence similar to that of the related genus Hydrangea. The fruit is a glossy metallic purple-blue berry.

Dichroa febrifuga (Chinese: 常山; pinyin: chángshān) is an important herb in traditional Chinese medicine, where it is considered one of the 50 fundamental herbs.

Selected species

- Dichroa daimingshanensis Y.C.Wu
- Dichroa febrifuga Lour.
- Dichroa hirsuta Gagnep.
- Dichroa mollissima Merrill
- Dichroa versicolour
- Dichroa yaoshanensis Y.C.Wu
- Dichroa yunnanensis S.M.Hwang
