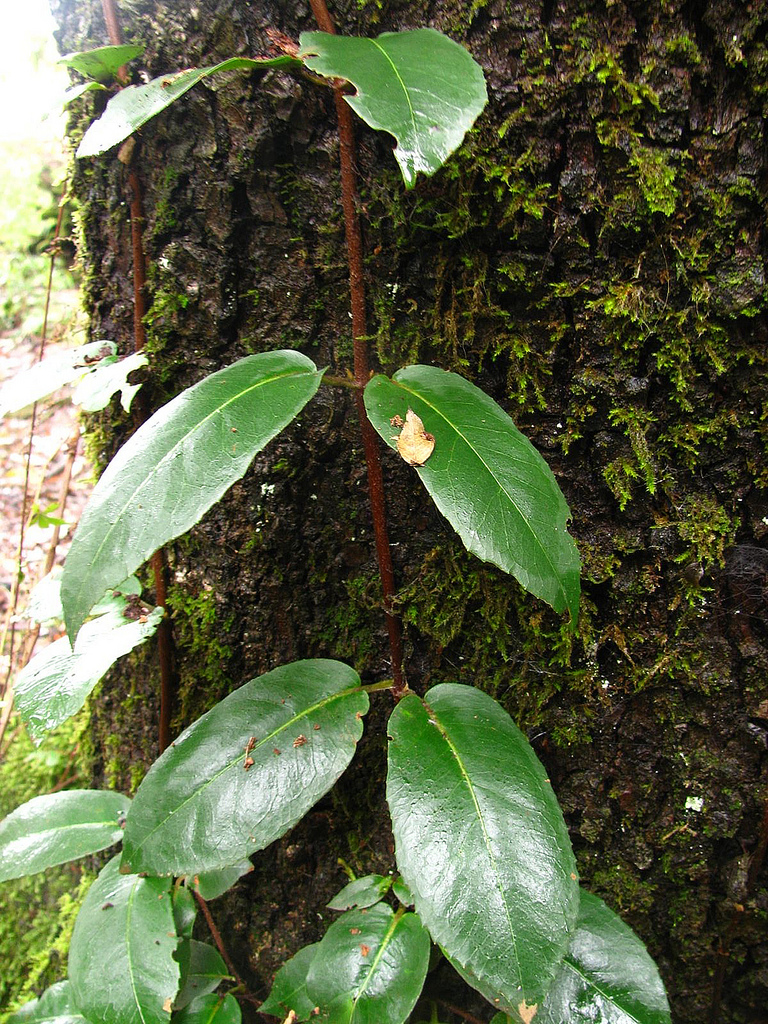

Scientific classification
- Kingdom: Plantae
- Clade: Tracheophytes
- Clade: Angiosperms
- Clade: Eudicots
- Clade: Asterids
- Order: Cornales
- Family: Hydrangeaceae
- Genus: Hydrangea
- Species: H. serratifolia

Binomial name
- Hydrangea serratifolia (Hook. & Arn.) F.Phil.

Synonyms
- List: Cornidia integerrima Hook. & Arn.; Hydrangea integerrima (Hook. & Arn.) Engl.; Hydrangea scandens Poepp.

= Hydrangea serratifolia =

Species of flowering plant

Hydrangea serratifolia is a species of climbing flowering plant in the family Hydrangeaceae. It is native to Chile and Argentina.

In its natural habitat, it is parasitized by the gall-forming fungus Austrobasidium pehueldeni.
