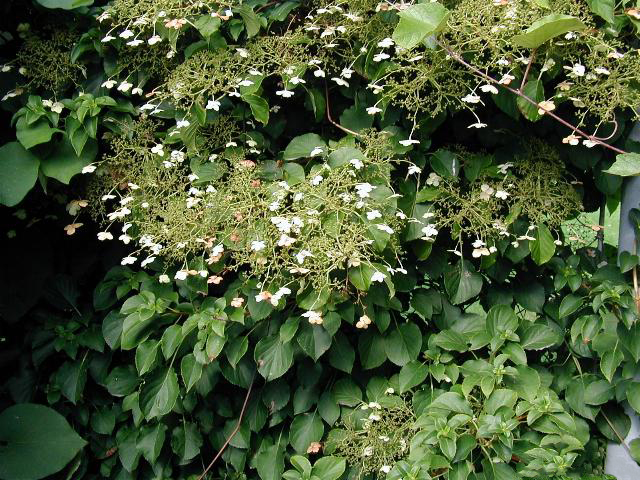
- 'Climbing hydrangea' – foliage and flowers

Scientific classification
- Kingdom: Plantae
- Clade: Tracheophytes
- Clade: Angiosperms
- Clade: Eudicots
- Clade: Asterids
- Order: Cornales
- Family: Hydrangeaceae
- Genus: Hydrangea
- Species: H. petiolaris

Binomial name
- Hydrangea petiolaris Siebold & Zucc.

= Hydrangea petiolaris =

Species of flowering plant

Hydrangea petiolaris, a climbing hydrangea (syn: Hydrangea anomala subsp. petiolaris), is a species of flowering plant in the family Hydrangeaceae native to the woodlands of Japan, the Korean Peninsula, and on Sakhalin island of easternmost Siberia in the Russian Far East.

Hydrangea petiolaris is sometimes treated as a subspecies of the closely related Hydrangea anomala from China, Myanmar, and the Himalaya, as Hydrangea anomala subsp. petiolaris. The Hydrangea anomala species differs in being smaller (to 12 metres (39 ft) ) and having flower corymbs up to 15 cm (5.9 in) diameter. The common name climbing hydrangea is applied to both species, or to species and subspecies.

== Description ==
Hydrangea petiolaris is a vigorous woody climbing vine plant, growing to 30 to 50 ft (9 to 15 m) height and 5 to 6 ft (2 to 2 m) wide. It grows up trees and rock faces in its native Asian habitats, climbing by means of small aerial roots on the stems. The leaves are deciduous, ovate, 4–11 cm (1.6–4.3 in) long and 3–8 cm (1.2–3.1 in) broad, with a heart-shaped base, coarsely serrated margin and acute apex.

The flowers are produced in flat corymbs 15–25 cm (5.9–9.8 in) diameter in mid-summer; each corymb includes a small number of peripheral sterile white flowers 2.5–4.5 cm (1.0–1.8 in) across, and numerous small, off-white fertile flowers 1–2 mm diameter. The fruit is a dry urn-shaped capsule 3–5 mm diameter containing several small winged seeds.

== Cultivation ==
Hydrangea petiolaris is cultivated as an ornamental plant in Europe and North America. Climbing hydrangea is grown either on masonry walls or on sturdy trellises or fences. It is at its best where it gets morning sun and afternoon shade, however it can tolerate dense shade, and is therefore often selected for shady, north-facing areas with little or no sun. Its clinging rootlets are not as strong as some other wall-climbing vines, and so is often anchored with supplemental gardening ties. Its outward-reaching side shoots can be pruned back to a pair of buds to espalier it flatter against its support. When pruned during flowering, the blooms are useful in bouquets.

It can also be grown as a ground cover, to eventually grow over an area of up to 200 square feet (19 m^{2}).

It is an USDA climatic Zone 4a plant, so it can resist temperatures down to between -34.4 °C (-30 °F) and -31.7 °C (-25 °F).

The young leaves of climbing hydrangea are edible when cooked. Tasting like cucumber, they are sometimes added to miso in Japan.

== Gallery ==
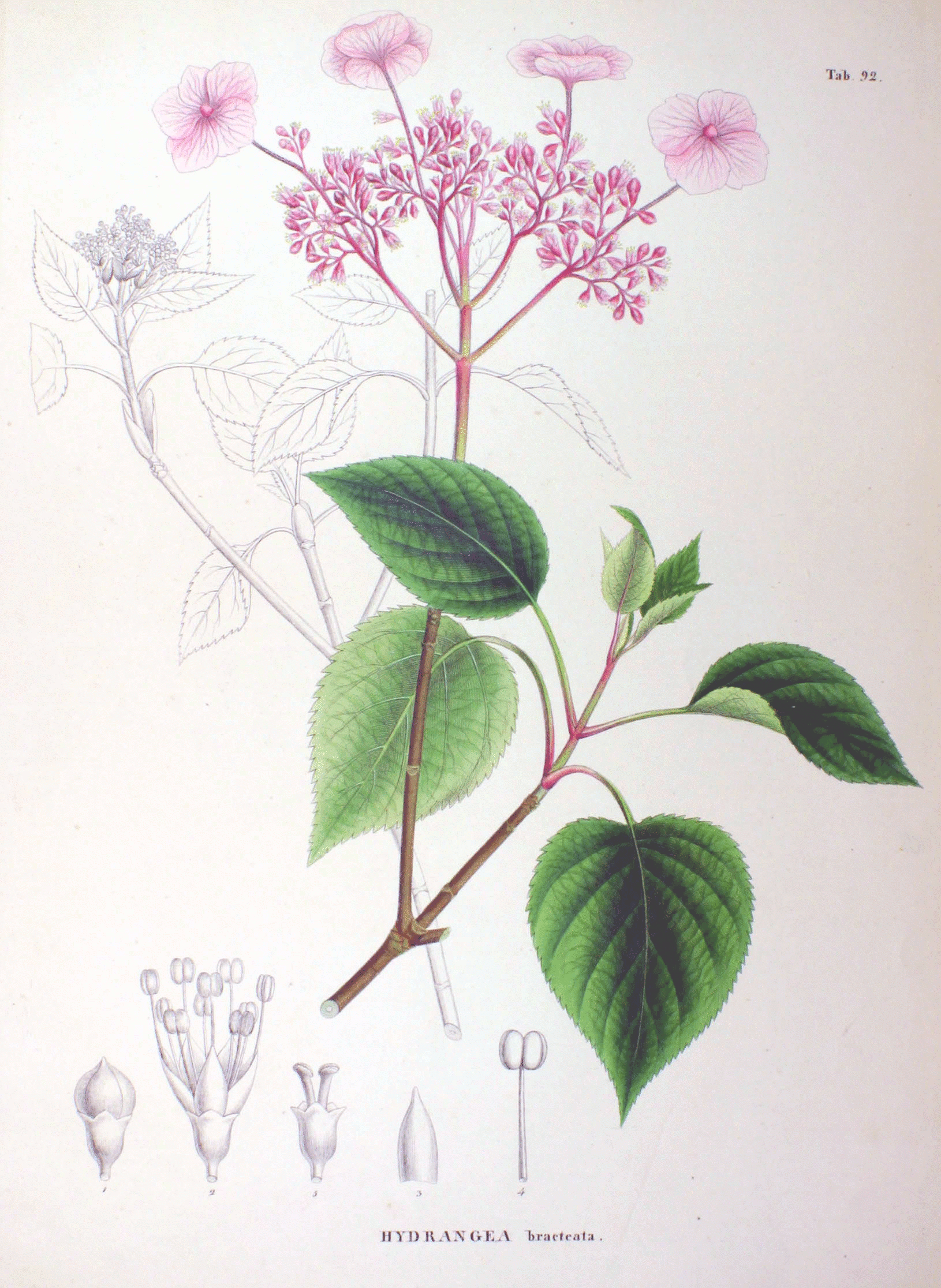
Botanical illustration

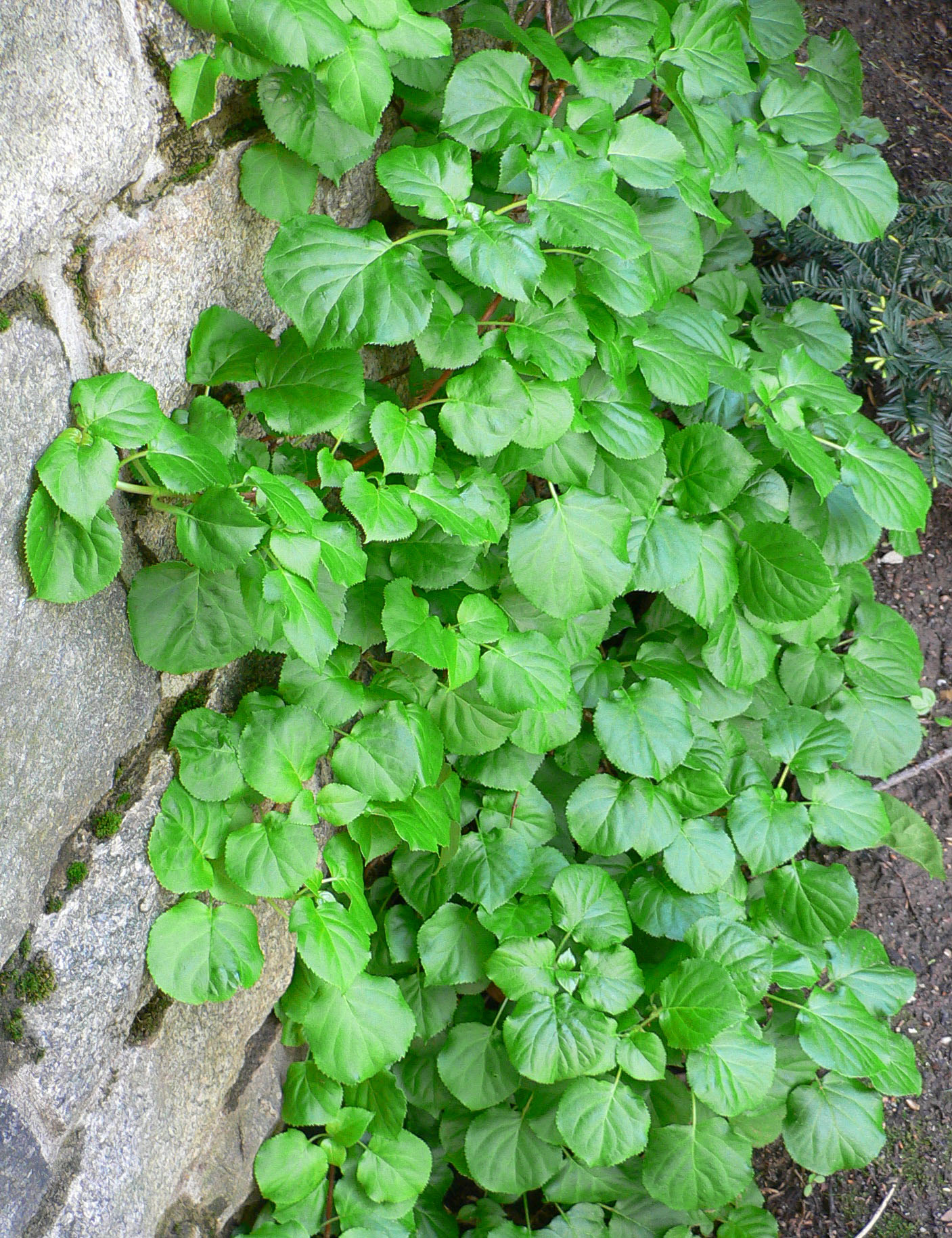
Plant form on garden wall

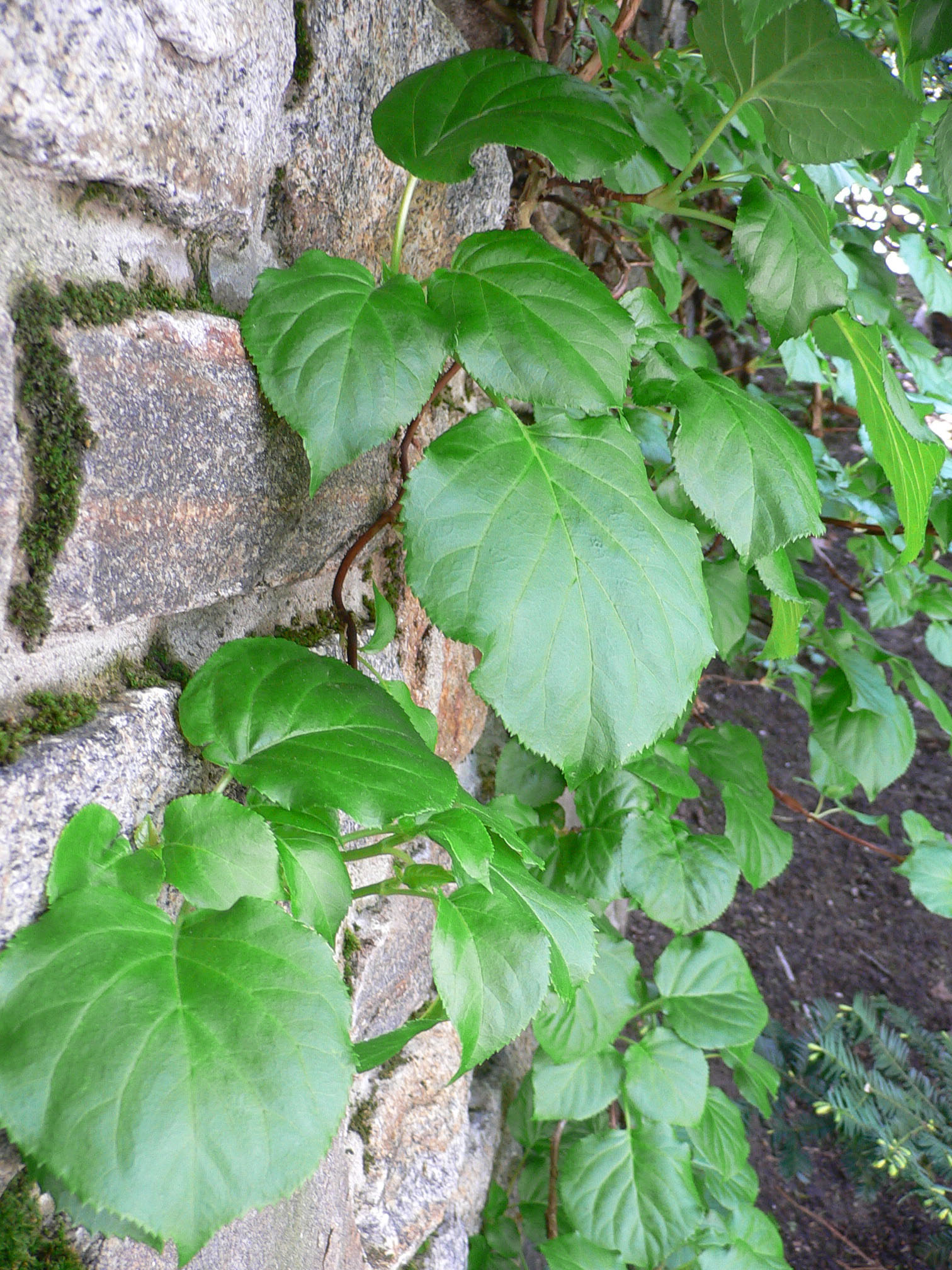
Foliage close-up

== Etymology ==
'Hydrangea' is derived from Greek and means 'water vessel', which is in reference to the shape of its seed capsules.

== See also ==
- Hydrangea anomala
