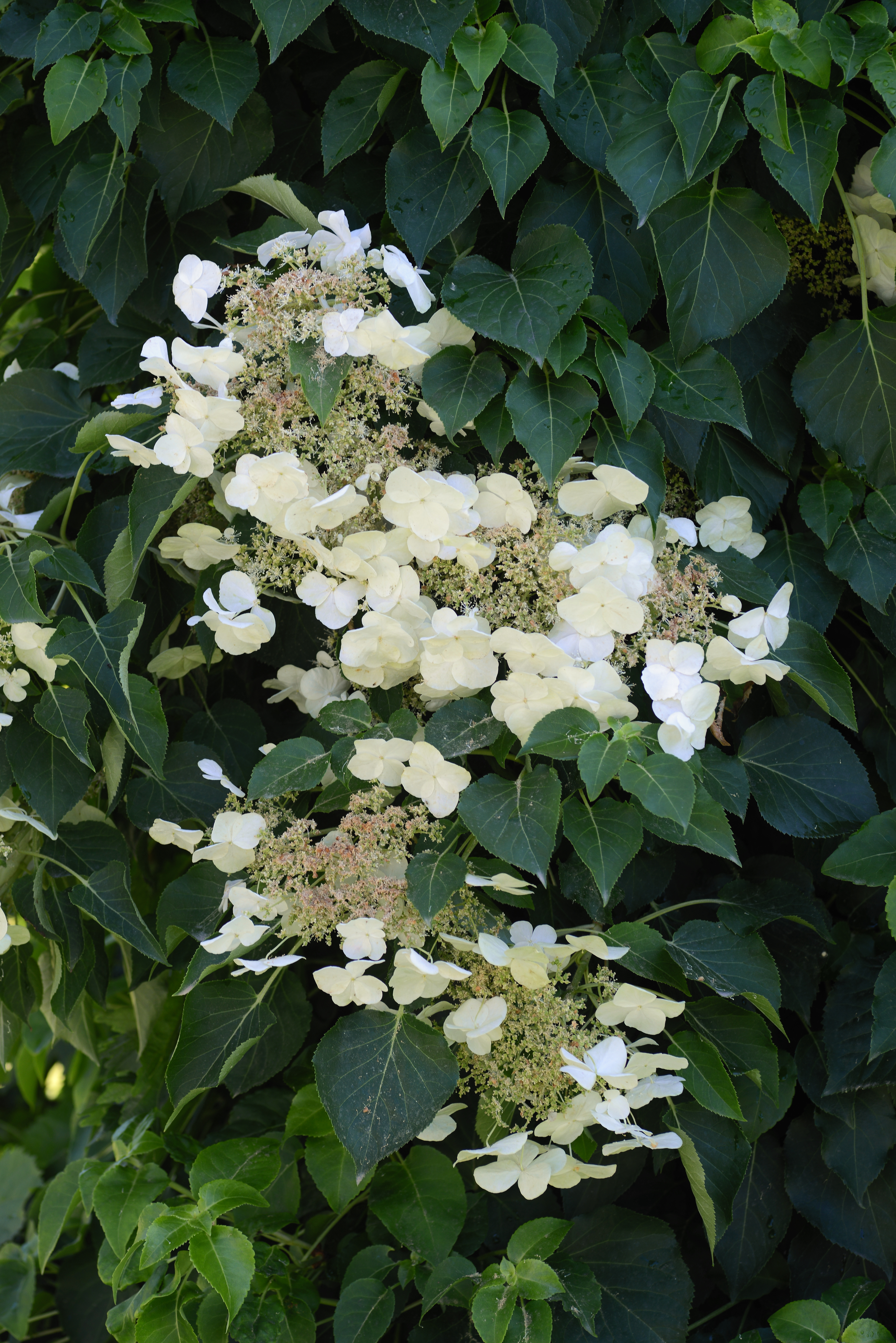
- Hydrangea anomala

Scientific classification
- Kingdom: Plantae
- Clade: Tracheophytes
- Clade: Angiosperms
- Clade: Eudicots
- Clade: Asterids
- Order: Cornales
- Family: Hydrangeaceae
- Genus: Hydrangea
- Species: H. anomala

Binomial name
- Hydrangea anomala D.Don

Synonyms
- List: Hydrangea altissima Wall.; Hydrangea glabra Hayata; Hydrangea glaucophylla C.C. Yang

= Hydrangea anomala =

Species of flowering plant

Hydrangea anomala, the Japanese climbing-hydrangea, is a species of flowering plant in the family Hydrangeaceae native to the woodlands of the Himalaya, southern and central China and northern Myanmar.

It is a woody climbing plant, growing to 12 m (39 ft) height up trees or rock faces, climbing by means of small aerial roots on the stems. The leaves are deciduous, ovate, 7–13 cm (2.8–5.1 in) long and 4–10 cm (1.6–3.9 in) broad, with a heart-shaped base, coarsely serrated margin and acute apex. The flowers are produced in flat corymbs 5–15 cm (2.0–5.9 in) diameter in mid-summer; each corymb includes a small number of peripheral sterile white flowers 2–3.5 cm (0.8–1.4 in) across, and numerous small, creamy-white fertile flowers 1–2 mm diameter. The fruit is a dry urn-shaped capsule 3–5 mm diameter containing several small winged seeds.

The closely related Hydrangea petiolaris from eastern Siberia, Japan, and Korea, is sometimes treated as a subspecies of H. anomala; it differs in growing larger (to 20 m or 66 ft) and flower corymbs up to 25 cm (9.8 in) diameter. The common name Climbing hydrangea is applied to both species.

== Cultivation and uses ==
Hydrangea anomala is grown as an ornamental plant. The subspecies H. anomala subsp. petiolaris has received the Royal Horticultural Society's Award of Garden Merit.

== Etymology ==
'Hydrangea' is derived from Greek and means 'water vessel', which is in reference to the shape of its seed capsules.

'Anomala' means 'anomalous' or 'unlike its fellows'.
