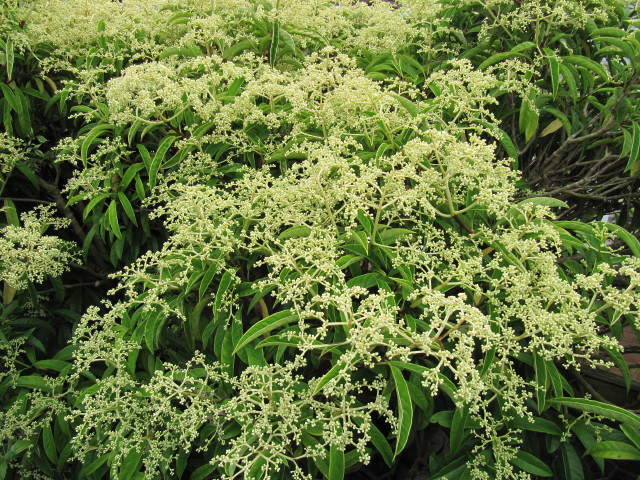

Scientific classification
- Kingdom: Plantae
- Clade: Tracheophytes
- Clade: Angiosperms
- Clade: Eudicots
- Clade: Asterids
- Order: Cornales
- Family: Hydrangeaceae
- Genus: Pileostegia
- Species: P. viburnoides

Binomial name
- Pileostegia viburnoides Hook.f. & Thomson

= Pileostegia viburnoides =

Species of flowering plant

Pileostegia viburnoides, a climbing plant related to the hydrangea, is a species of flowering plant in the family Hydrangeaceae, native to India and eastern Asia. It is a slow-growing, self-clinging, evergreen climber eventually growing to 6 m (20 ft) in length, with long narrow leaves and dense panicles of creamy white flowers in late summer.

The specific epithet viburnoides means "like a viburnum", though viburnums belong to a different family of plants.
