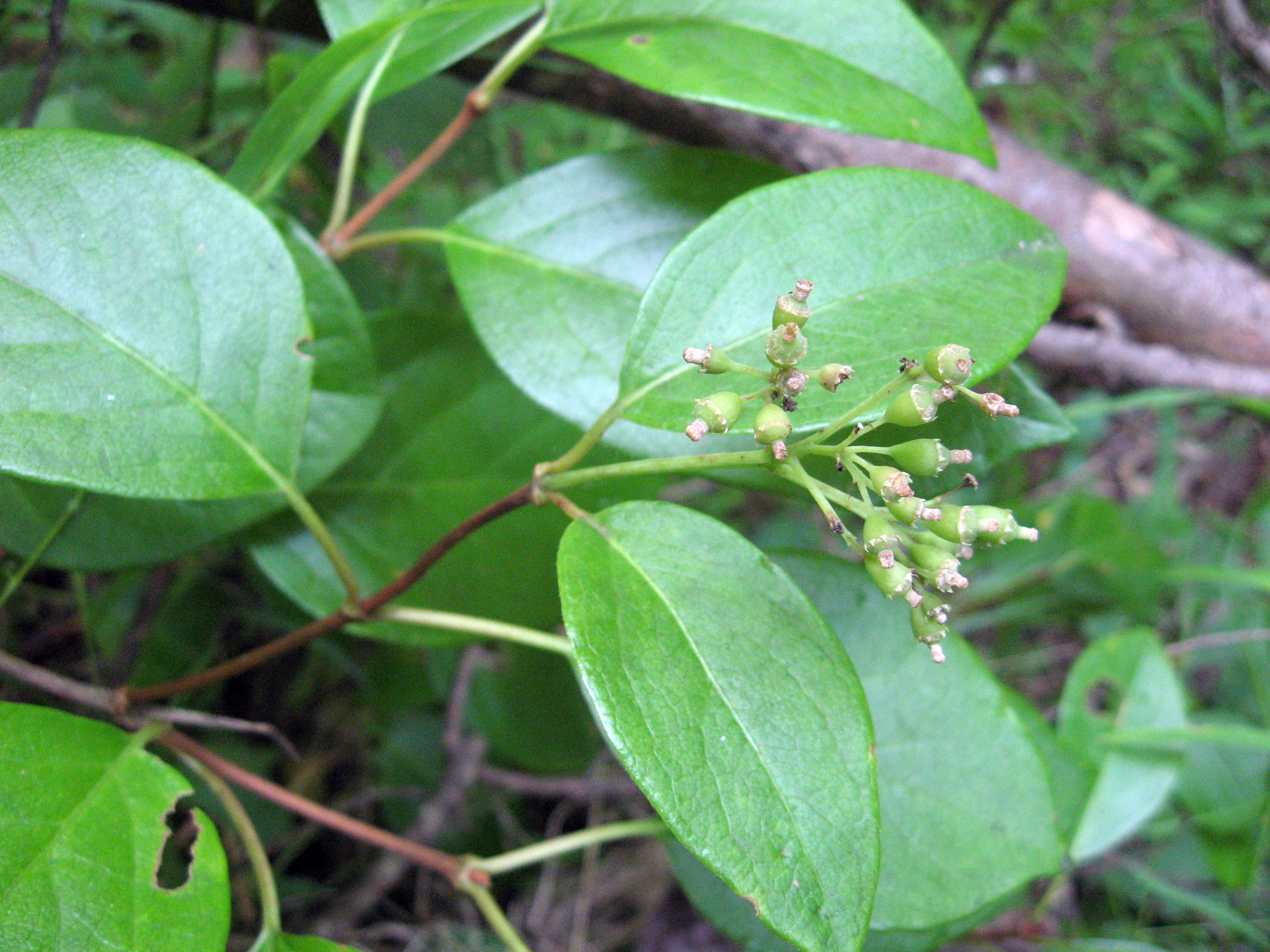
- Fruits of Hydrangea barbara

Conservation status
- Secure (NatureServe)

Scientific classification
- Kingdom: Plantae
- Clade: Tracheophytes
- Clade: Angiosperms
- Clade: Eudicots
- Clade: Asterids
- Order: Cornales
- Family: Hydrangeaceae
- Genus: Hydrangea
- Species: H. barbara

Binomial name
- Hydrangea barbara (L.) Bernd Schulz

Synonyms
- Decumaria barbara L.; Decumaria barbara var. sarmentosa (Bosc) DC.; Decumaria forsythia Michx.; Decumaria prostrata Lodd. ex G.Don; Decumaria radicans Moench; Decumaria sarmentosa Bosc; Decumaria scandens Salisb.; Forsythia scandens Walter

= Hydrangea barbara =

Species of flowering plant

Hydrangea barbara (formerly Decumaria barbara), commonly called climbing hydrangea or woodvamp, is a species plant in the Hydrangea family. It is native to southeastern United States, where it is widespread. Its typical natural habitat is wet bottomland forest, although it is also found in rich mesic forests in the Appalachian Mountains.

Hydrangea barbara is a high-climbing woody vine that clings to trees with hairy aerial roots. It has adventitious roots and glossy, opposite leaves. It produces small white flowers in late spring and early summer.

It was formerly placed in the same genus as Decumaria sinensis, of central China.

== Gallery ==
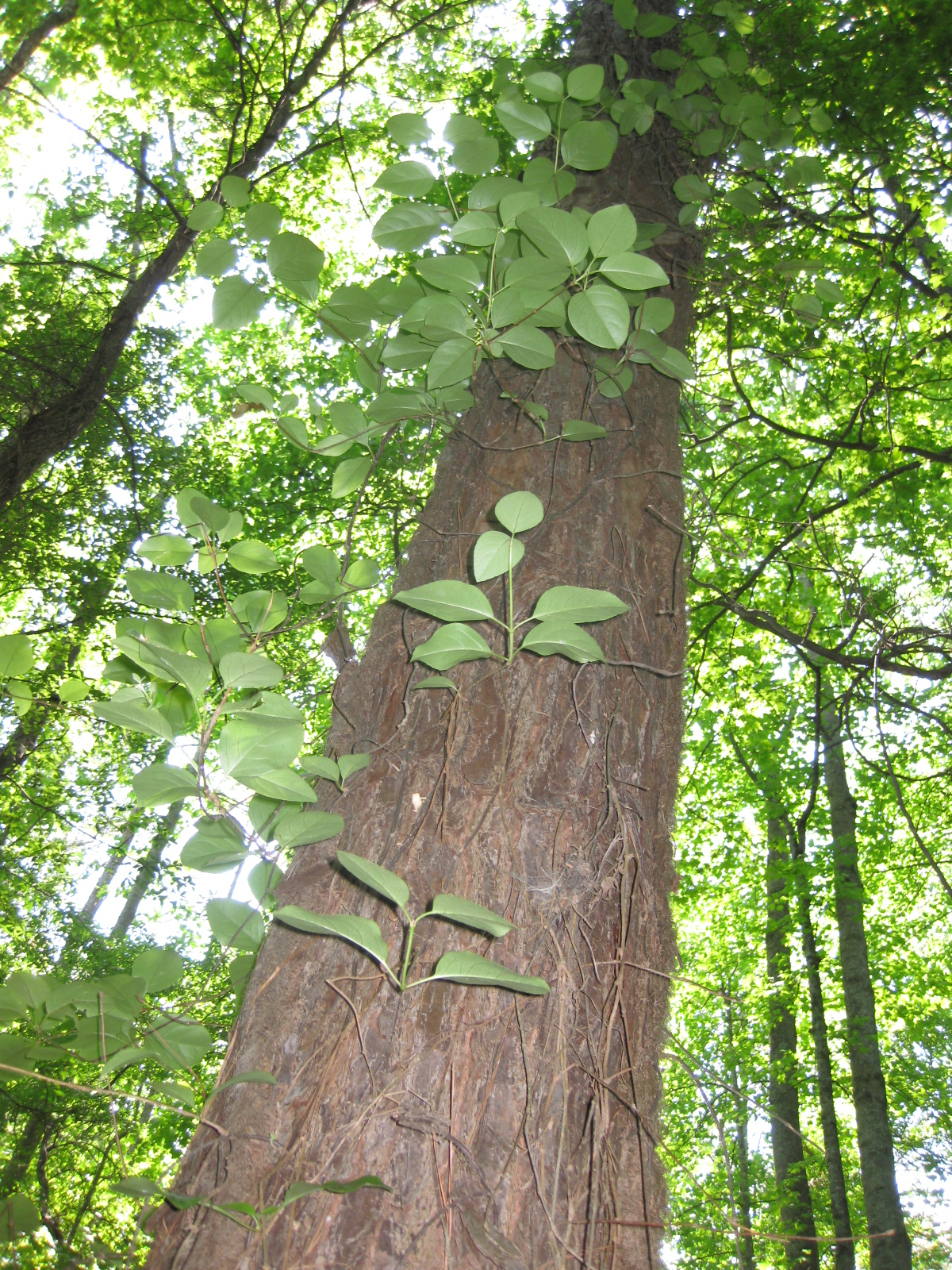
Hydrangea barbara climbing a tree.
