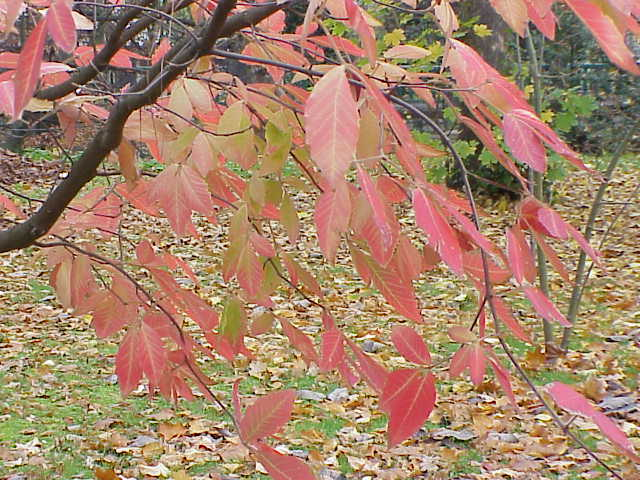
- Foliage in autumn

Conservation status
- Least Concern (IUCN 3.1)

Scientific classification
- Kingdom: Plantae
- Clade: Tracheophytes
- Clade: Angiosperms
- Clade: Eudicots
- Clade: Rosids
- Order: Sapindales
- Family: Sapindaceae
- Genus: Acer
- Section: Acer sect. Trifoliata
- Series: Acer ser. Grisea
- Species: A. maximowiczianum

Binomial name
- Acer maximowiczianum Miq.

Synonyms
- Acer nikoense

= Acer maximowiczianum =

Species of maple

Acer maximowiczianum (Nikko maple; syn. A. nikoense Maxim.), is a species of maple widely distributed in China (Anhui, Hubei, Hunan, Jiangxi, Sichuan, Zhejiang) and Japan (Honshū, Kyūshū, Shikoku).

== Description ==
It is a slender deciduous tree that reaches a height of 15–20 m (49–66 ft) but is usually smaller. It is a trifoliate maple, related to such other species as threeflower maple (Acer triflorum) and paperbark maple (Acer griseum) but has dark gray to blackish bark dissimilar to the exfoliating bark of either.

The leaves have a 3–5 centimeters (1.2–2.0 in) petiole and three leaflets; the leaflets are oblong, 5–15 centimeters (2.0–5.9 in) long and 3–6 centimeters (1.2–2.4 in) broad, with dense, soft pubescence and smooth margins. The hard, horizontally spreading samaras are 3.5–6 centimeters (1.4–2.4 in) long and 1.2 centimeters (0.47 in) broad, and have the same parthenocarpic tendencies as those of A. griseum.

== Taxonomy ==
The Chinese populations are sometimes treated as a separate subspecies A. maximowiczianum subsp. megalocarpum (Rehder) A.E.Murray, but this is not recognised as distinct by the Flora of China.

Many older texts refer to the species under its synonym A. nikoense Maxim., but as Maximowicz had also cited the name Negundo nikoense Miq. in synonymy, his new name had to be regarded as the same as that under the ICBN. Miquel pointed out that his Negundo nikoense was actually a different plant to the maple Maximowicz had intended to describe, and therefore gave the Nikko Maple a new name, honouring Maximowicz in the process.

Acerogenin M, a cyclic diarylheptanoid, can be found in A. nikoense.

== Cultivation ==
Nikko maple was first introduced to cultivation in 1881, when seeds were imported by the Veitch Nurseries in England, after they were discovered by Charles Maries in the forests of Hokkaidō. It is rarely seen in cultivation outside of arboreta. The largest specimens in England are up to 17 meters (56 ft) tall and 70 centimeters (28 in) trunk diameter. In the United States, a mature specimen may be seen at Arnold Arboretum in Boston, Massachusetts.
