= Stilpnolepis =

Scientific classification
- Kingdom: Plantae
- Clade: Tracheophytes
- Clade: Angiosperms
- Clade: Eudicots
- Clade: Asterids
- Order: Asterales
- Family: Asteraceae
- Subfamily: Asteroideae
- Tribe: Anthemideae
- Genus: Stilpnolepis; Krasch.
- Species: S. centiflora

Binomial name
- Stilpnolepis centiflora (Maxim.) Krasch.

Synonyms
- Homotypic Synonyms: Artemisia centiflora Maxim.; Heterotypic Synonyms: Artemisia centiflora var. pilifera Y.Ling; Stilpnolepis centiflora var. pilifera (Y.Ling) H.C.Fu

Genus of plants

Stilpnolepis is a genus of Asian plants in the chamomile tribe within the daisy family.

The only known species is Stilpnolepis centiflora, native to Mongolia and to China (Gansu, Nei Mongol, Ningxia, Shaanxi).

formerly included

see Elachanthemum

- Stilpnolepis intricata - Elachanthemum intricatum
