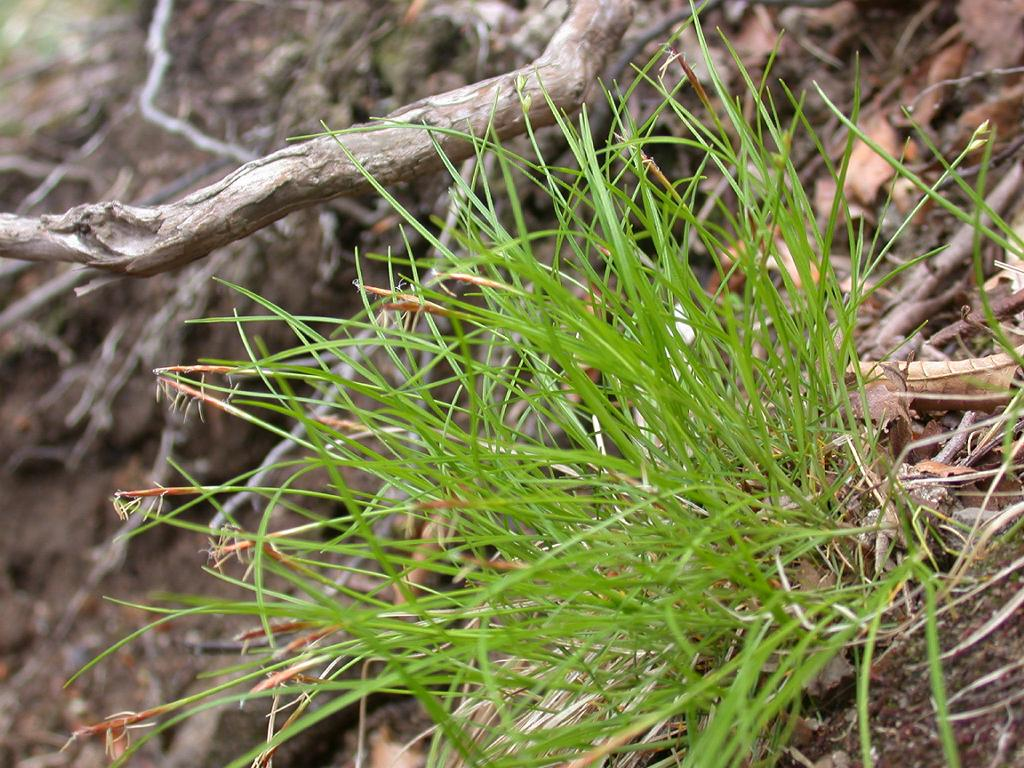

Scientific classification
- Kingdom: Plantae
- Clade: Tracheophytes
- Clade: Angiosperms
- Clade: Monocots
- Clade: Commelinids
- Order: Poales
- Family: Cyperaceae
- Genus: Carex
- Species: C. grallatoria

Binomial name
- Carex grallatoria Maxim.

= Carex grallatoria =

Species of grass-like plant

Carex grallatoria is a sedge that is native to Japan and Taiwan.

== Taxonomy ==
The species was first described by Karl Maximovich in 1886 in the Bulletin de l'Académie impériale des sciences de St.-Pétersbourg.

== See also ==
- List of Carex species
