= Carex neurocarpa =

Scientific classification
- Kingdom: Plantae
- Clade: Embryophytes
- Clade: Tracheophytes
- Clade: Spermatophytes
- Clade: Angiosperms
- Clade: Monocots
- Clade: Commelinids
- Order: Poales
- Family: Cyperaceae
- Genus: Carex
- Species: C. neurocarpa

Binomial name
- Carex neurocarpa Maxim.

Species of grass-like plant

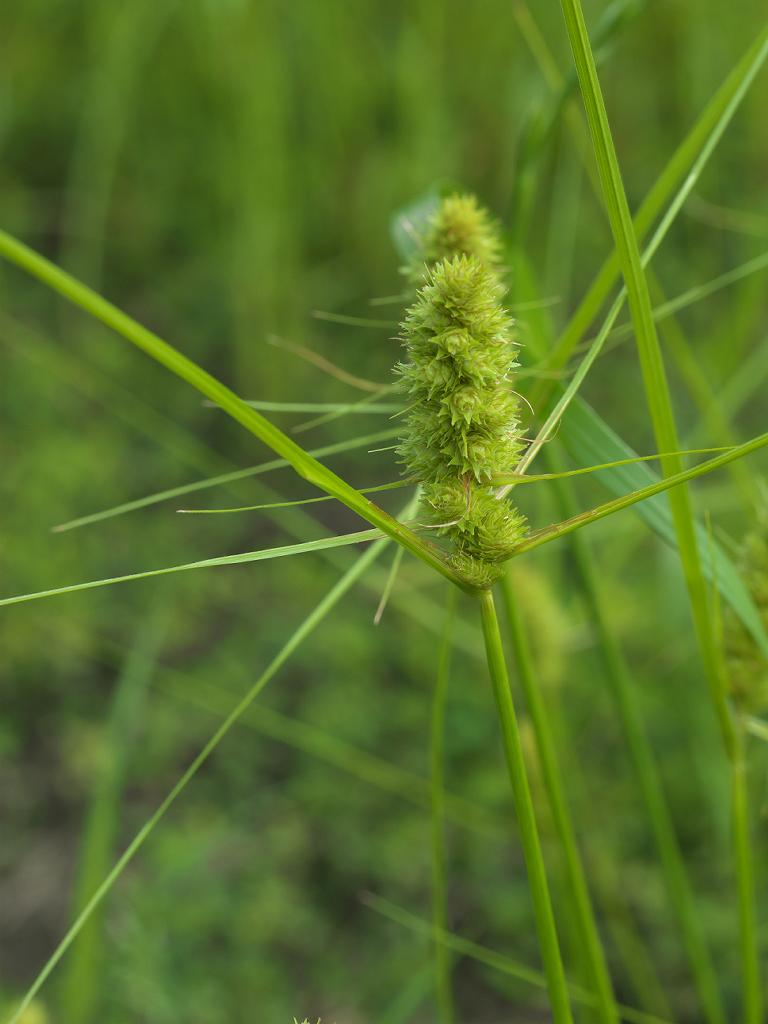
Carex neurocarpa. Mie Prefecture, Japan

Carex neurocarpa, also known as nerve-fruited sedge, is a sedge that is native to parts of Japan, Korea, eastern parts of China, Mongolia and south eastern parts of Russia.

== Taxonomy ==
The species was first described by Karl Maximovich in 1859 in the Bulletin de l'Académie impériale des sciences de St.-Pétersbourg.

== See also ==
- List of Carex species
