= Herminium biporosum =

Scientific classification
- Kingdom: Plantae
- Clade: Tracheophytes
- Clade: Angiosperms
- Clade: Monocots
- Order: Asparagales
- Family: Orchidaceae
- Subfamily: Orchidoideae
- Genus: Herminium
- Species: H. biporosum

Binomial name
- Herminium biporosum Maxim.

Synonyms
- Porolabium biporosum (Maxim.) Tang & F.T.Wang; Monorchis biporosa (Maxim.) O.Schwarz

Species of flowering plant

Herminium biporosum is a species of flowering plant in the family Orchidaceae, native to China (south-central, north-central and Qinghai). It was first described by Karl Maximovich.
