= Salvia piasezkii =

Scientific classification
- Kingdom: Plantae
- Clade: Tracheophytes
- Clade: Angiosperms
- Clade: Eudicots
- Clade: Asterids
- Order: Lamiales
- Family: Lamiaceae
- Genus: Salvia
- Species: S. piasezkii

Binomial name
- Salvia piasezkii Maxim.

Species of flowering plant

Salvia piasezkii is an herb that is native to Gansu and Shaanxi provinces in China. It grows approximately 18 cm (7.1 in) tall. Inflorescences are 6-flowered widely spaced verticillasters in few branched panicles. The corolla is purple, and approximately 7 mm (0.28 in).
