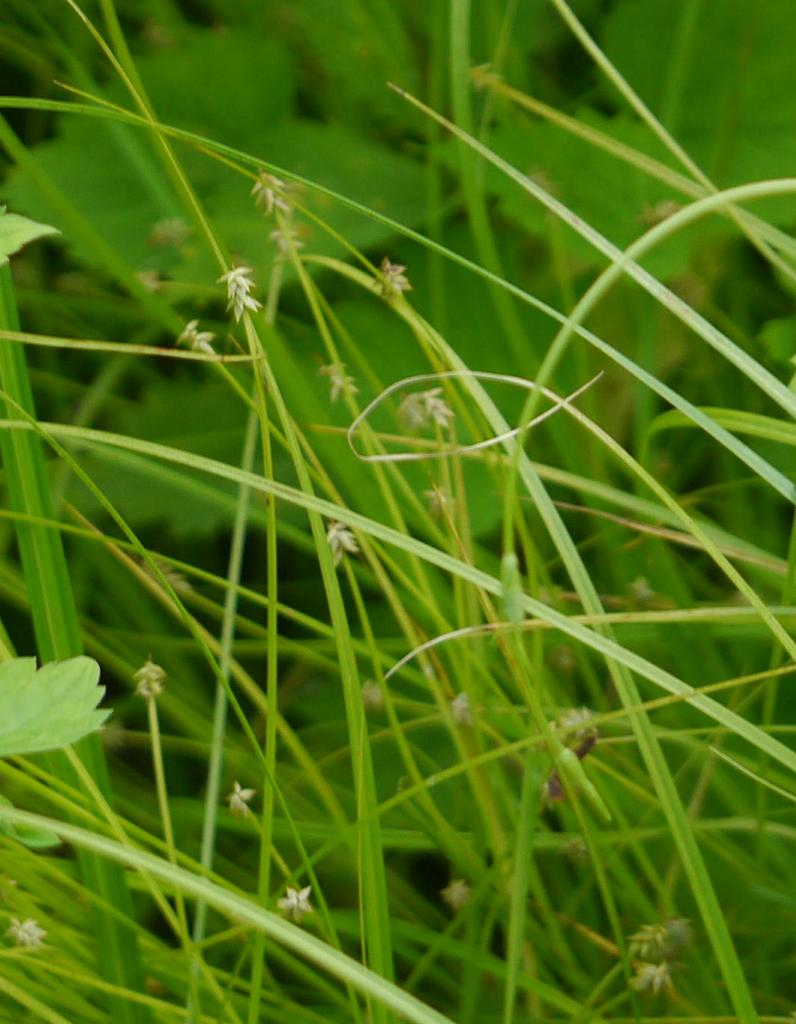
- Flowers

Scientific classification
- Kingdom: Plantae
- Clade: Tracheophytes
- Clade: Angiosperms
- Clade: Monocots
- Clade: Commelinids
- Order: Poales
- Family: Cyperaceae
- Genus: Carex
- Species: C. uda

Binomial name
- Carex uda Maxim.

= Carex uda =

Species of flowering plant

Carex uda, the Uda needle sedge, is a species of flowering plant in the family Cyperaceae. It is native to the southern Russian Far East, Manchuria, Korea, and Japan. It is a widespread species, found in meadows.
