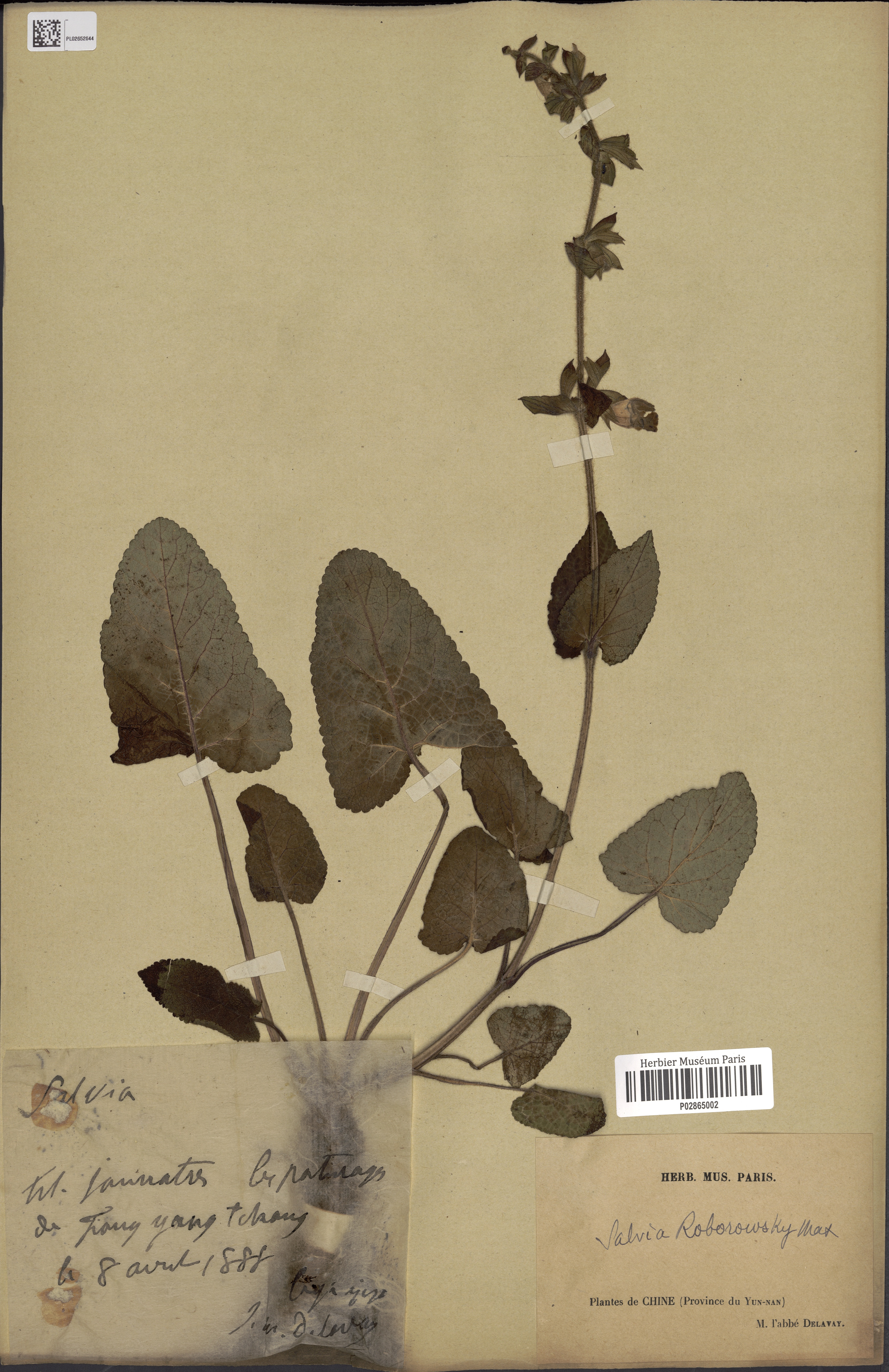

Scientific classification
- Kingdom: Plantae
- Clade: Tracheophytes
- Clade: Angiosperms
- Clade: Eudicots
- Clade: Asterids
- Order: Lamiales
- Family: Lamiaceae
- Genus: Salvia
- Species: S. roborowskii

Binomial name
- Salvia roborowskii Maxim.

= Salvia roborowskii =

Species of herb

Salvia roborowskii is an annual or sometimes biennial herb that is native to a wide area that includes Tibet, Sikkim, and five provinces in China, growing on wet stream banks, grasslands, and hillsides between 8,000 and 12,000 feet elevation.

Growing up to 3 feet tall in the wild, Salvia roborowskii has triangular rosemary-green leaves that cover the upright plant. The leaves have scalloped edges, have a hairy surface, and are indented with veins. The 0.25 inch lemon-yellow flowers grow out from a rosemary-green calyx, with 8-12 flowers per whorl. Only a few flowers are in bloom at a time.
