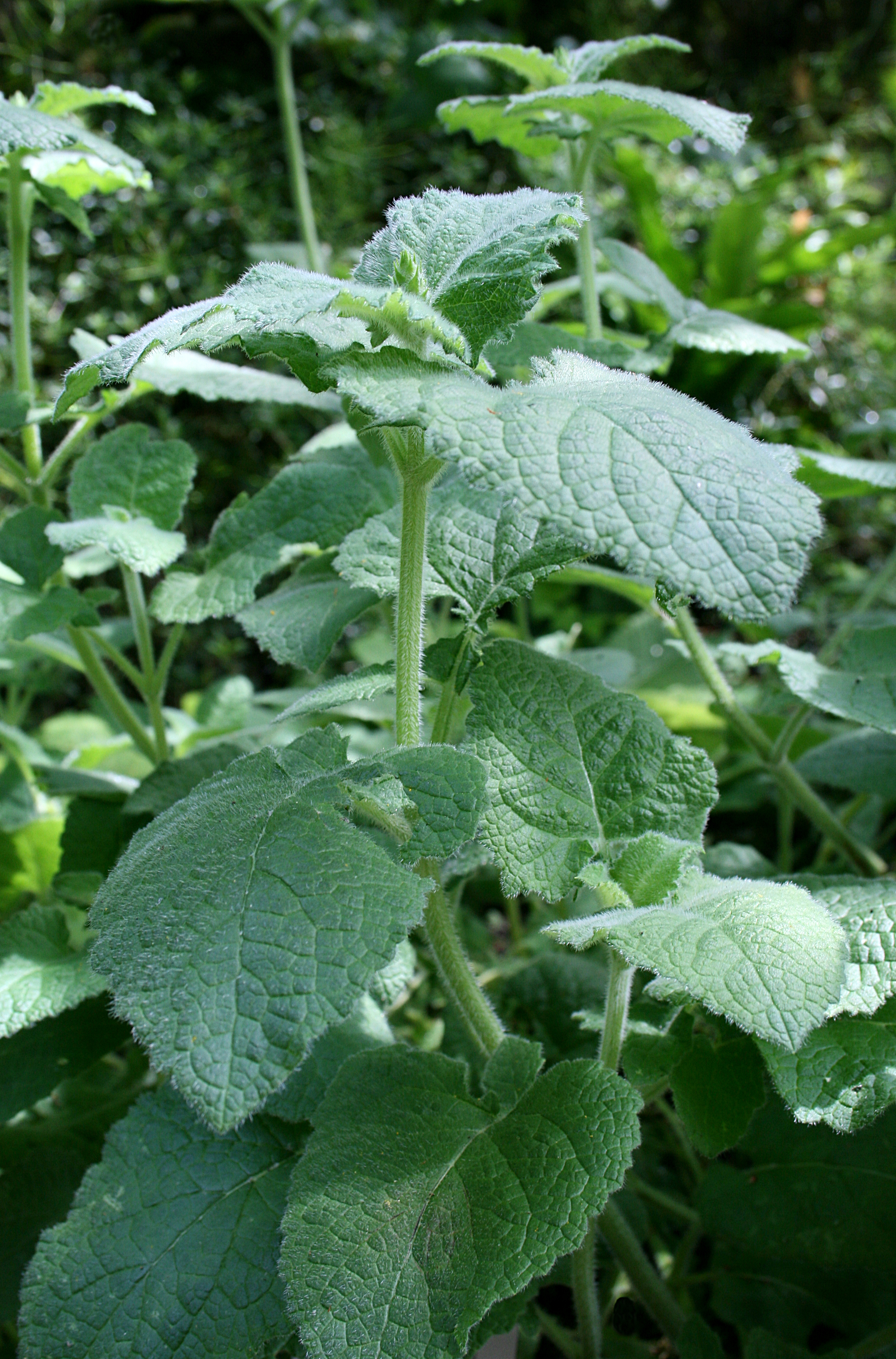

Scientific classification
- Kingdom: Plantae
- Clade: Tracheophytes
- Clade: Angiosperms
- Clade: Eudicots
- Clade: Asterids
- Order: Lamiales
- Family: Lamiaceae
- Genus: Salvia
- Species: S. przewalskii

Binomial name
- Salvia przewalskii Maxim.

= Salvia przewalskii =

Species of flowering plant

Salvia przewalskii (Ganzi sage) is a herbaceous perennial plant native to the Chinese provinces of Gansu, Hubei, Sichuan, Xizang, and Yunnan, typically growing along stream banks, forest edges, among shrubs, and on granitic hillsides. It was described and named in 1881 by the Russian botanist Carl Maximowicz after the Russian explorer and botanist Nikolai Przhevalsky, who made several collecting trips to China in the 19th century. The plant is widely known throughout its native habitat for its medicinal properties.

Salvia przewalskii forms a basal clump of yellow-green leaves 1 to 2 feet (30 to 61 cm) high and wide, with flowering stalks rising 3 feet (91.4 cm) above the plant. The 6-12 inch (15 to 30 cm) leaves, with long petioles, have distinct veins on the underside. The inflorescence is branched, with widely spaced whorls of flowers opening a few at once. The 1 inch (2.54 cm) flowers are fat, with an unusual purple-red or red-brown color. The calyx is hairy and glandular, red-brown and two-lipped. It is usually seen only in botanical gardens, though seeds have become available for gardeners since the 1980s. Botanists have segregated the species into four varieties, distinguished by leaf shape and differences in the hairs covering the foliage.
