= Carex hancockiana =

Scientific classification
- Kingdom: Plantae
- Clade: Tracheophytes
- Clade: Angiosperms
- Clade: Monocots
- Clade: Commelinids
- Order: Poales
- Family: Cyperaceae
- Genus: Carex
- Species: C. hancockiana

Binomial name
- Carex hancockiana Maxim.

Species of grass-like plant

Carex hancockiana, also known as Hancock's sedge, is a sedge that is native to parts of Russia and China.

== Taxonomy ==
The species was first described by Karl Maximovich in 1879 in the Bulletin de l'Académie impériale des sciences de St.-Pétersbourg.

== See also ==
- List of Carex species
