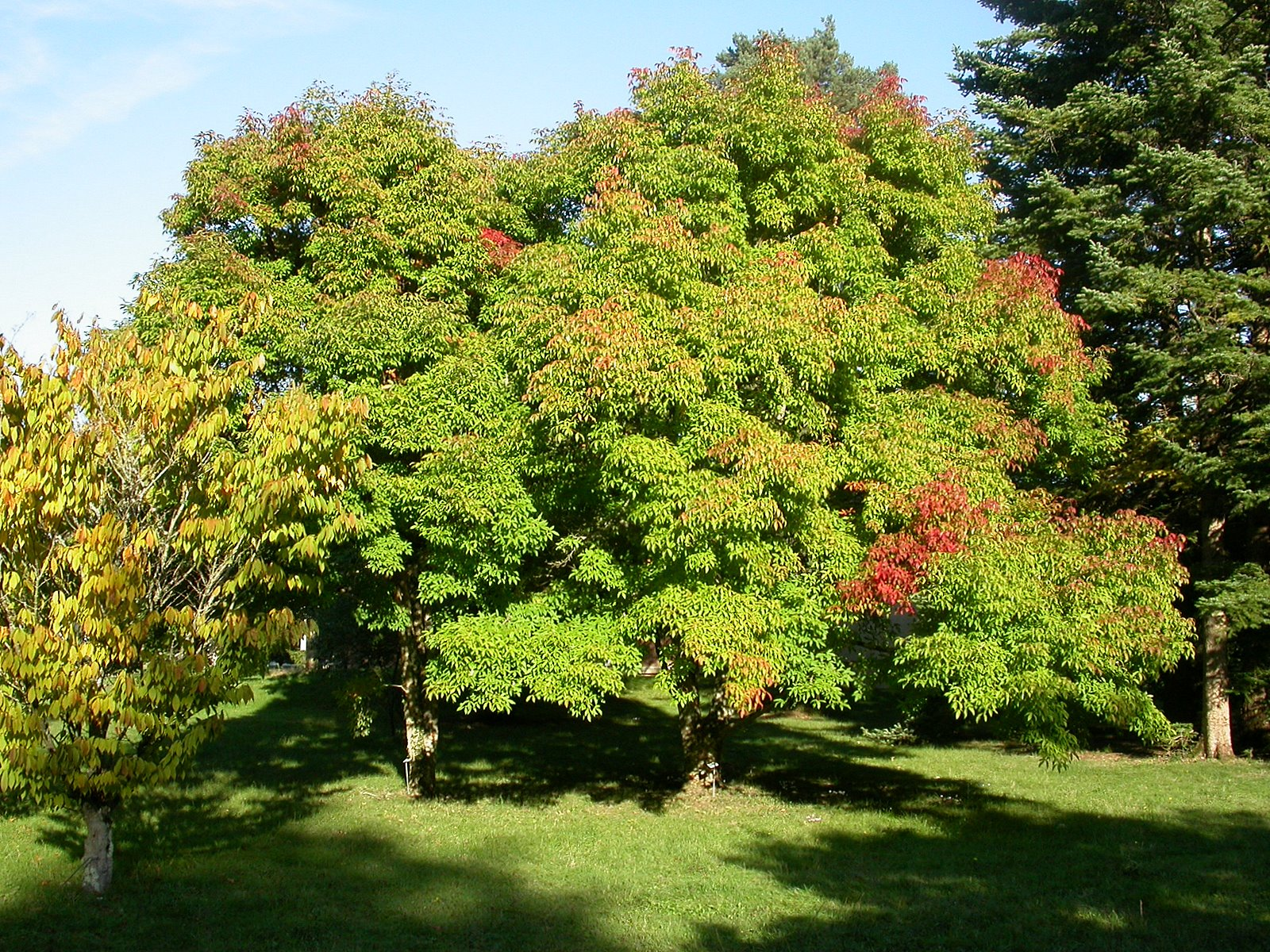

Scientific classification
- Kingdom: Plantae
- Clade: Tracheophytes
- Clade: Angiosperms
- Clade: Eudicots
- Clade: Rosids
- Order: Sapindales
- Family: Sapindaceae
- Genus: Acer
- Section: Acer sect. Trifoliata
- Series: Acer ser. Grisea
- Species: A. triflorum

Binomial name
- Acer triflorum Kom.

= Acer triflorum =

Species of maple

Acer triflorum, the three-flowered maple, is a species of maple native to hills of northeastern China (Heilongjiang, Jilin, Liaoning) and Korea.

It is a deciduous tree that reaches a height of about 25 metres (82 ft) but is usually smaller. It is a trifoliate maple related to such other species as Manchurian Maple (Acer mandshuricum) and Paperbark Maple (Acer griseum). It has yellowish-brown exfoliating bark that peels in woody scales rather than papery pieces like Acer griseum.

The leaves have a 2.5–6 centimetres (0.98–2.36 in) petiole and three leaflets; the leaflets are 4–9 centimetres (1.6–3.5 in) long and 2–3.5 centimetres (0.79–1.38 in) broad, with serrated margins, the central leaflet the same size as or slightly larger than the two side leaflets. The flowers are yellow, produced in small corymbs of three small flowers each, hence the name. The samaras are 3.5–4.5 centimetres (1.4–1.8 in) long and 1.3–2 cm broad, hairy, the nutlet with a woody shell.

Even more than its relatives, three-flower maple has spectacular fall colour that may include brilliant orange, scarlet, purple and gold. It is one of the few trees to develop good fall colour in shade.

== Cultivation ==
The species was first introduced to cultivation in 1923. Although common in maple collections, it is rarely seen in cultivation outside of arboreta.

It grows at a slow to moderate rate and prefers moist, well drained soil; growth is often shrub-like in cultivation. It is relatively tolerant of drought and clay compared to its close relatives. It does not tolerate wet or over-compacted soil. Propagation is similar to that required for Acer griseum and the number of viable seeds is likewise very small.

In Great Britain, the largest specimens are up to 13 m (43 ft) tall, and 60 cm (24 in) trunk diameter (Tree Register of the British Isles). It has gained the Royal Horticultural Society's Award of Garden Merit. In the United States, mature specimens can be seen at Arnold Arboretum in Boston, Massachusetts.
