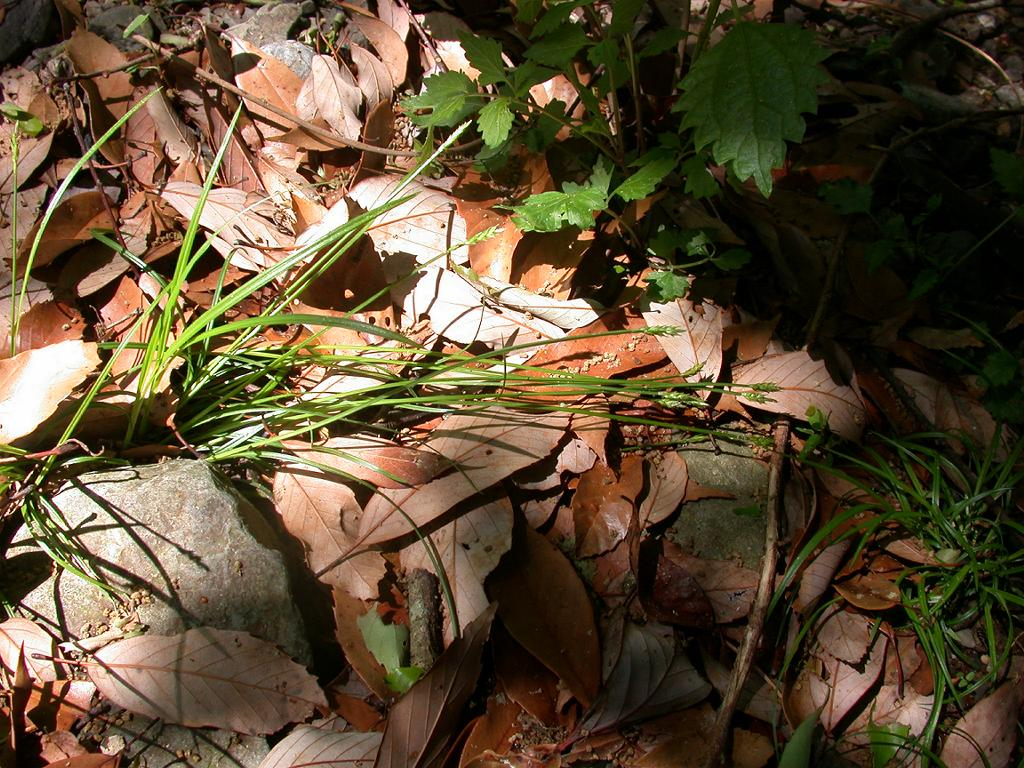

Scientific classification
- Kingdom: Plantae
- Clade: Tracheophytes
- Clade: Angiosperms
- Clade: Monocots
- Clade: Commelinids
- Order: Poales
- Family: Cyperaceae
- Genus: Carex
- Species: C. rhizopoda

Binomial name
- Carex rhizopoda Maxim.

Synonyms
- Carex krebsiana Boeckeler; Carex rhizopoda f. longior (Maxim.) Kük.; Carex rhizopoda f. longior Maxim.

= Carex rhizopoda =

Species of grass-like plant

Carex rhizopoda, also commonly known as rhizopoda sedge, is a sedge that is native to parts of Japan and eastern parts of China.

== Description ==
The perennial sedge has a long thick rhizome which is covered in brown coloured fibrous remains of the leaves. It has soft and trigonous shaped culms that are typically 30 to 60 cm (12 to 24 in) in length. The sedge has soft and herbaceous leaves that are usually shorter than the culms. The leaf blade is 2 to 4 mm (0.079 to 0.157 in) wide and is scabris along the margins. It produces a one-spiked terminal and erect inflorescence that has a linear to cylindrical shape and is 40 to 70 mm (1.6 to 2.8 in) long and 2 to 3 mm (0.079 to 0.118 in) wide and produces three to five flowers.

== Taxonomy ==
The species was first described by Karl Maximovich in 1886 in the Bulletin de l'Académie impériale des sciences de St.-Pétersbourg. It has three synonyms.

== Distribution ==
The plant is found in temperate biomes in Asia with a range extending from Jiangxi and Anhui provinces of south-eastern China and in Japan.

== See also ==
- List of Carex species
