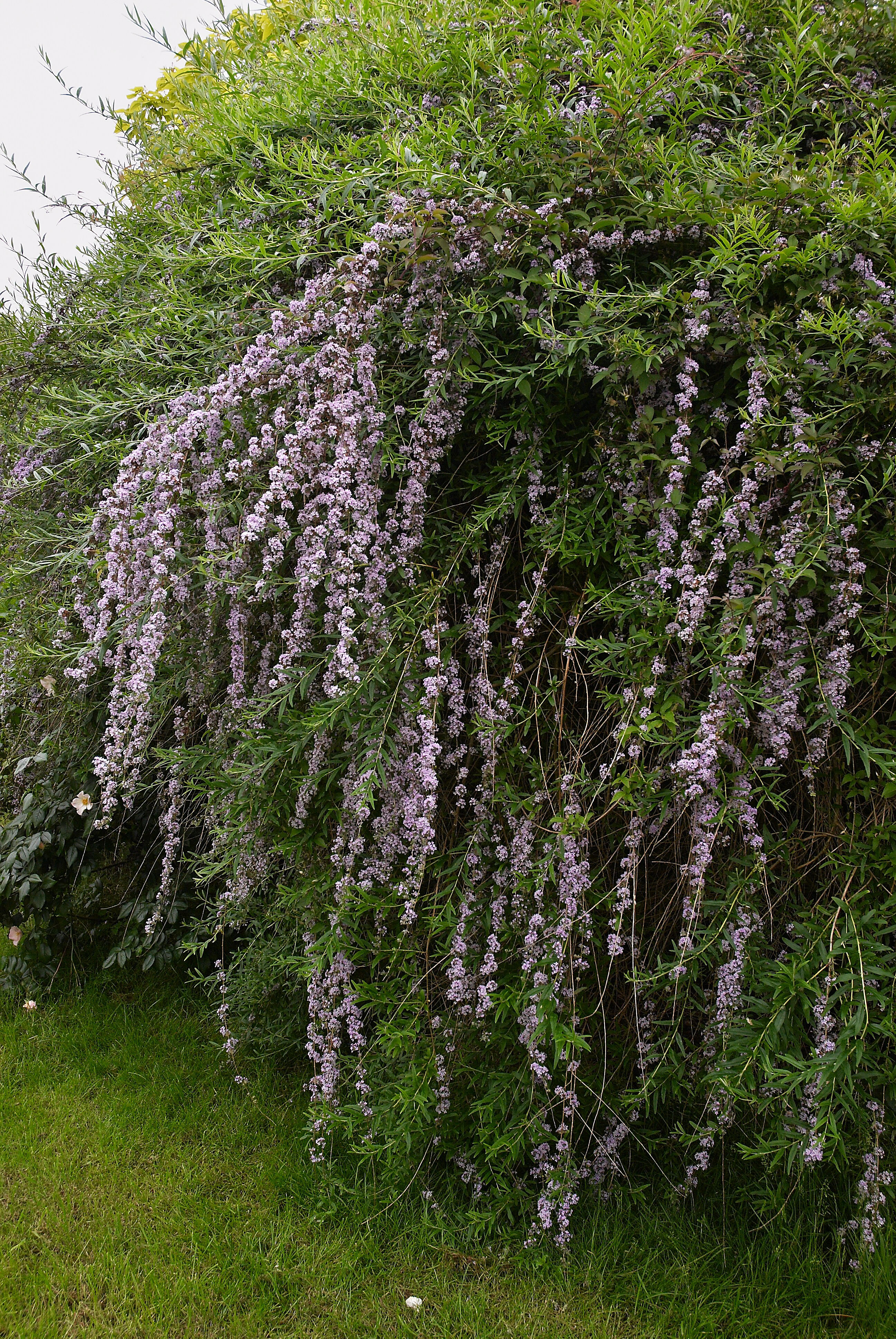

Scientific classification
- Kingdom: Plantae
- Clade: Tracheophytes
- Clade: Angiosperms
- Clade: Eudicots
- Clade: Asterids
- Order: Lamiales
- Family: Scrophulariaceae
- Genus: Buddleja
- Species: B. alternifolia

Binomial name
- Buddleja alternifolia Maxim.

Synonyms
- Buddleja legendrei Gagnep.; Buddleja tsetangensis Marquand

= Buddleja alternifolia =

Species of plant

Buddleja alternifolia, known as alternate-leaved butterfly-bush, is a species of flowering plant in the figwort family, which is endemic to Gansu, China. A substantial deciduous shrub growing to 4 metres (13 ft) tall and wide, it bears grey-green leaves and graceful pendent racemes of scented lilac flowers in summer.

== Description ==
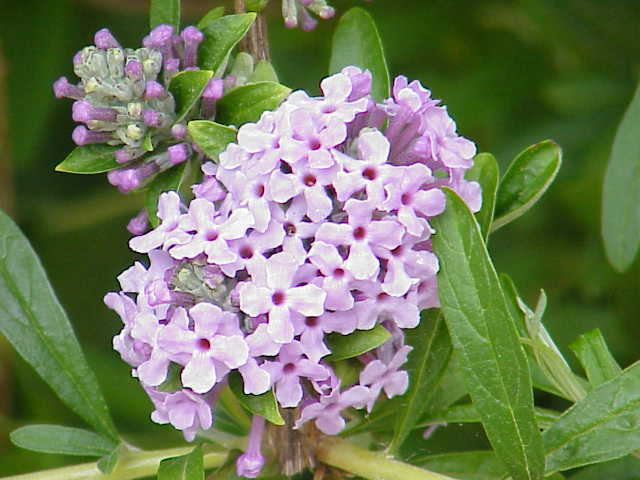
Inflorescence

B. alternifolia is a vigorous deciduous shrub reaching 5 m (16 ft) tall with long, slender, pendulous stems. The leaves are alternate, entire, and lanceolate, 4–10 cm long by 0.6–1 cm wide, glabrous and dark green above. The inflorescences of the plants in cultivation are bright lilac-purple, and comprise flowers so densely crowded in clusters along the branch as to often obscure it. However, specimens from the Tsangpo valley in Tibet originally named B. tsetangensis by Marquand have creamy flowers. Flowering occurs in early summer; the flowers are fragrant, but less so than other buddlejas. 2n = 38.

In its native territory it grows along river banks in thickets at elevations of 1,500–4,000 m (4,900–13,100 ft).

== Taxonomy ==
In his 1979 revision of the taxonomy of the African and Asiatic species of Buddleja, the Dutch botanist Anthonius Leeuwenberg sank two species, B. legendrei and B. tsetangensis, as B. alternifolia on the basis of the similarity in the individual flowers, dismissing the variations in plant structure, flower colour and leaf as attributable to environmental factors. It was Leeuwenberg's taxonomy which was adopted in the Flora of China published in 1996. Until DNA analysis can prove otherwise, it is this classification which is accepted here.

== Cultivation ==
In the West this plant was first described and named by the Russian botanist Carl Maximowicz in 1880. It was not introduced to cultivation in the West until 1915, by Purdom and Farrer.

The species has become very common in cultivation, a popular shrub for the larger garden, and is readily available from most garden centres in the UK. Fully hardy, it prefers a sunny position and loamy soil; pruning should immediately follow flowering. Like most buddlejas, the species is easily propagated from cuttings. Hardiness: RHS H5, USDA zones 7 – 9.

B. alternifolia was accorded the Royal Horticultural Society's Award of Garden Merit (record 674) in 1993.

=== Cultivars ===
- Buddleja alternifolia 'Argentea'.
