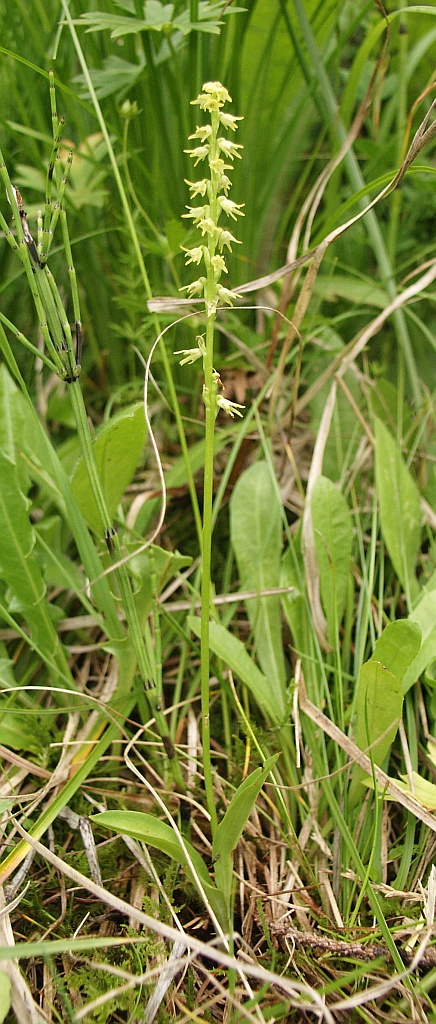
- Musk orchid (Herminium monorchis)

Scientific classification
- Kingdom: Plantae
- Clade: Tracheophytes
- Clade: Angiosperms
- Clade: Monocots
- Order: Asparagales
- Family: Orchidaceae
- Subfamily: Orchidoideae
- Tribe: Orchideae
- Subtribe: Orchidinae
- Genus: Herminium; L.

Synonyms
- Monorchis Ség., nom. inval.; Monorchis Ehrh.; Cybele Falc., not validly publ.; Thisbe Falc., not validly publ.; Androcorys Schltr.; Porolabium Tang & F.T.Wang; Bhutanthera Renz; Frigidorchis Z.J.Liu & S.C.Chen

= Herminium =

Genus of flowering plants

Herminium is a genus of plants in family Orchidaceae, widespread across much of Europe and Asia.

== Species ==
Species accepted as of March 2018:

- Herminium alaschanicum Maxim. – Mongolia to China and C. Nepal.
- Herminium albomarginatum (King) X.H.Jin – C. & E. Himalaya
- Herminium albosanguineum (Renz) X.H.Jin – C. Bhutan
- Herminium albovirens (Renz) X.H.Jin – Sikkim to Bhutan
- Herminium biporosum Maxim. – E. Qinghai to China (NE. Shanxi, Yunnan)
- Herminium bulleyi (Rolfe) Tang & F.T.Wang – China (W. Sichuan, N. Yunnan)
- Herminium chloranthum Tang & F.T.Wang – S. Tibet to C. Nepal and China (W. Sichuan, NW. Yunnan)
- Herminium clavigerum (Lindl.) X.H.Jin – Himalaya to S. Tibet
- Herminium coeloceras (Finet) Schltr. – E. & SE. Tibet to China (W. Sichuan, N. Yunnan) and N. Myanmar
- Herminium coiloglossum Schltr. – China (Yunnan)
- Herminium ecalcaratum (Finet) Schltr. – China (W. Sichuan, NW. Yunnan)
- Herminium edgeworthii (Hook.f. ex Collett) X.H.Jin – Pakistan to Himalaya
- Herminium elisabethae (Duthie) Tang & F.T.Wang – Himalaya to Tibet
- Herminium fallax (Lindl.) Hook.f. – Himalaya to China (SW. Sichuan, NW. Yunnan)
- Herminium fimbriatum (Raskoti) X.H.Jin – Nepal
- Herminium forceps (Finet) Schltr. – SE. Tibet to C. China
- Herminium glossophyllum Tang & F.T.Wang – China (SW. Sichuan, NW. Yunnan)
- Herminium gracile King & Pantl. – Sikkim to C. China
- Herminium handelii X.H.Jin – C. & E. Himalaya to China (Yunnan)
- Herminium himalayanum (Renz) X.H.Jin – Bhutan to Tibet
- Herminium hongdeyuanii Raskoti – Nepal
- Herminium humidicola (K.Y.Lang & D.S.Deng) X.H.Jin – SE. Qinghai to China (Gansu)
- Herminium jaffreyanum King & Pantl. – E. Nepal to E. Himalaya
- Herminium josephi Rchb.f. – WC. Himalaya to China (W. Sichuan, N. Yunnan)
- Herminium kalimpongense Pradhan – Darjiling (Kalimpong)
- Herminium kamengense A.N.Rao – E. Nepal, Arunachal Pradesh
- Herminium kumaunense Deva & H.B.Naithani – Himalaya
- Herminium lanceum (Thunb. ex Sw.) Vuijk – Mongolia to Trop. Asia
- Herminium latilabre (Lindl.) X.H.Jin – N. Pakistan to China (SE. Sichuan, N. Yunnan)
- Herminium longilobatum S.N.Hegde & A.N.Rao – E. Nepal, Arunachal Pradesh
- Herminium mackinonii Duthie – Himalaya
- Herminium macrophyllum (D.Don) Dandy – Pakistan to Himalaya and S. Tibet
- Herminium mannii (Rchb.f.) Tang & F.T.Wang – E. Nepal to China (S. Sichuan, W. & C. Yunnan)
- Herminium monophyllum (D.Don) P.F.Hunt & Summerh. – Himalaya
- Herminium monorchis (L.) R.Br. in W.T.Aiton – Temp. Eurasia to Himalaya
- Herminium neotineoides Ames & Schltr. – China (W. Sichuan)
- Herminium ophioglossoides Schltr. – Qinghai to China (W. Sichuan to NW. & C. Yunnan)
- Herminium oxysepalum (K.Y.Lang) X.H.Jin – China (NW. Yunnan)
- Herminium pugioniforme Lindl. ex Hook.f. – Himalaya to SC. China
- Herminium pusillum Ohwi & Fukuy. – C. Nepal, Korea (Mt. Baekdu), C. Japan, C. Taiwan
- Herminium pygmaeum Renz – Bhutan to Tibet
- Herminium quinquelobum King & Pantl. – C. & E. Himalaya to China (NW. Yunnan)
- Herminium singulum Tang & F.T.Wang – China (SW. Sichuan, NW. Yunnan)
- Herminium souliei (Finet) Rolfe – C. Nepal, SE. Tibet to China (W. Sichuan, NE. & W. Yunnan)
- Herminium suave Tang & F.T.Wang – China (SW. Sichuan, N. Yunnan)
- Herminium tangianum (S.Y.Hu) K.Y.Lang – China (C. Yunnan)
- Herminium tibeticum X.H.Jin – Tibet
- Herminium wangianum X.H.Jin – SE. Tibet to China (SW. Sichuan, NW. Yunnan)
- Herminium yunnanense Rolfe – China (W. & C. Yunnan)
