= Herminium humidicola =

Scientific classification
- Kingdom: Plantae
- Clade: Tracheophytes
- Clade: Angiosperms
- Clade: Monocots
- Order: Asparagales
- Family: Orchidaceae
- Subfamily: Orchidoideae
- Genus: Herminium
- Species: H. humidicola

Binomial name
- Herminium humidicola (K.Y.Lang & D.S.Deng) X.H.Jin, Schuit., Raskoti & Lu Q.Huang

Synonyms
- Peristylus humidicola K.Y.Lang & D.S.Deng; Bhutanthera humidicola (K.Y.Lang & D.S.Deng) Ormerod; Frigidorchis humidicola (K.Y.Lang & D.S.Deng) Z.J.Liu & S.C.Chen

Species of orchid

Herminium humidicola is a species of terrestrial orchid endemic to southern China.
