= Herminium ophioglossoides =

Conservation status
- Vulnerable (IUCN 3.1)

Scientific classification
- Kingdom: Plantae
- Clade: Tracheophytes
- Clade: Angiosperms
- Clade: Monocots
- Order: Asparagales
- Family: Orchidaceae
- Subfamily: Orchidoideae
- Genus: Herminium
- Species: H. ophioglossoides

Binomial name
- Herminium ophioglossoides Schltr.

Synonyms
- Monorchis ophioglossoides (Schltr.) O.Schwarz

Species of flowering plant

Herminium ophioglossoides is a species of plant in the family Orchidaceae. It is endemic to China, known from the provinces of Sichuan and Yunnan.
