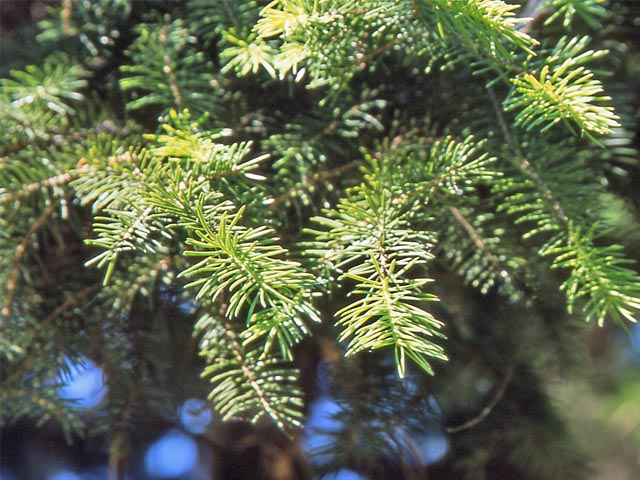

Conservation status
- Endangered (IUCN 3.1)

Scientific classification
- Kingdom: Plantae
- Clade: Tracheophytes
- Clade: Gymnospermae
- Division: Pinophyta
- Class: Pinopsida
- Order: Pinales
- Family: Pinaceae
- Genus: Picea
- Species: P. maximowiczii

Binomial name
- Picea maximowiczii Regel ex Mast.

Synonyms
- Homotypic Synonyms: Abies obovata var. japonica Maxim.; Picea excelsa f. japonica (Maxim.) Beissn.; Picea obovata var. japonica (Maxim.) Beissn.

= Picea maximowiczii =

Species of conifer

Picea maximowiczii, the Japanese bush spruce, is a species of conifer in the pine family, Pinaceae. It is endemic to Japan; its range is limited to Akaishi Mountains, Okuchichibu Mountains and the Yatsugatake Mountains on Honshu.
