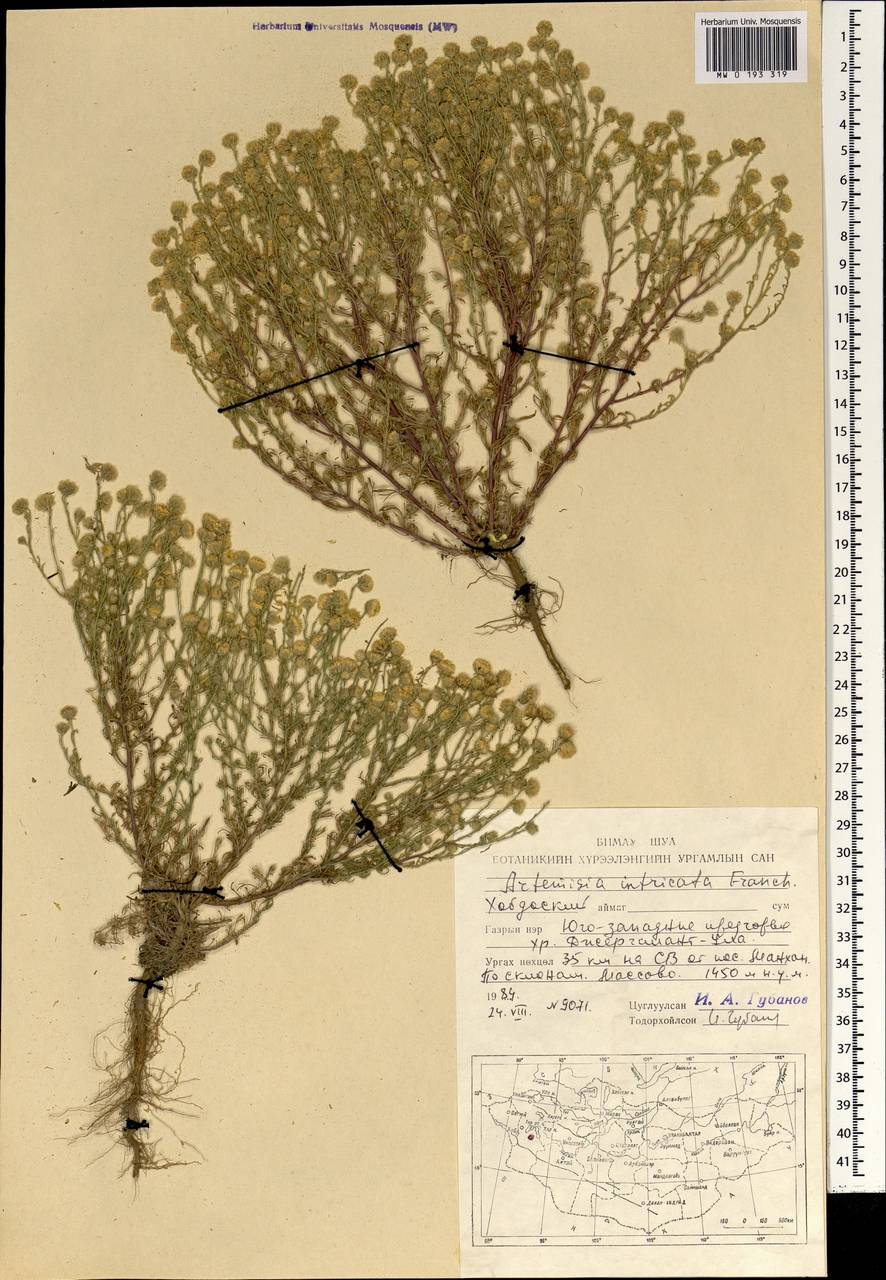

Scientific classification
- Kingdom: Plantae
- Clade: Embryophytes
- Clade: Tracheophytes
- Clade: Angiosperms
- Clade: Eudicots
- Clade: Asterids
- Order: Asterales
- Family: Asteraceae
- Subfamily: Asteroideae
- Tribe: Anthemideae
- Genus: Elachanthemum; I.M.Krascheninnikov
- Species: E. intricatum

Binomial name
- Elachanthemum intricatum (Franch.) Ling & Y.R.Ling

Synonyms
- Artemisia intricata Franch.; Elachanthemum intricatum var. macrocephalum H.C.Fu; Stilpnolepis intricata (Franch.) C.Shih

= Elachanthemum =

Genus of flowering plants

Elachanthemum is a genus of Asian plants in the chamomile tribe within the daisy family.

Species

The only known species is Elachanthemum intricatum. native to Mongolia and to China (Gansu, Nei Mongol, Ningxia, Qinghai, Xinjiang).
