= Exfoliation (botany) =

Natural peeling or shedding of bark

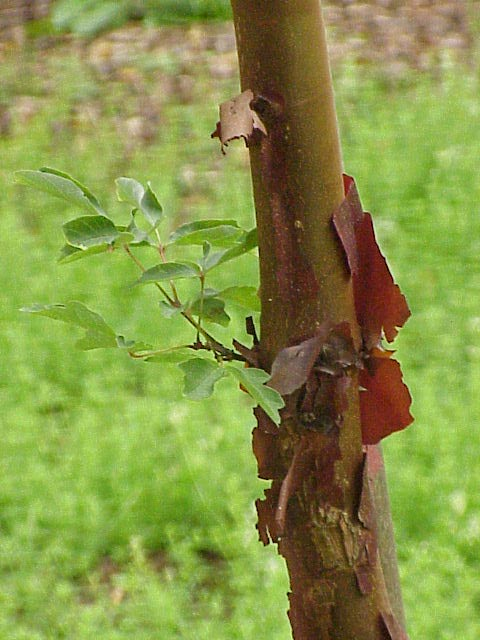
The exfoliating bark of the Paperbark Maple Acer griseum

In botany, exfoliation describes the natural process of bark peeling or otherwise separating from a tree trunk, typically in large strips or plates that remain partially attached to the trunk until such time as they are completely detached by the elements or the eventual and subsequent exfoliation of additional layers of bark. Examples of trees with exfoliating bark are the paperbark maple and various species of plane (sycamore) and birch.

Exfoliation also means the removal or loss of leaves from a plant. It is used both to describe the loss of a leaves as a natural part of a plant's life cycle (such as in the case of deciduous trees which lose their leaves in the autumn) or because of some trauma or outside cause (such as dehydration, an infestation of caterpillars or hurricane-force winds).

== See also ==
- Bark peeling by deer
