= Karl Maximovich =

Russian botanist (1827–1891)

Carl Johann Maximovich
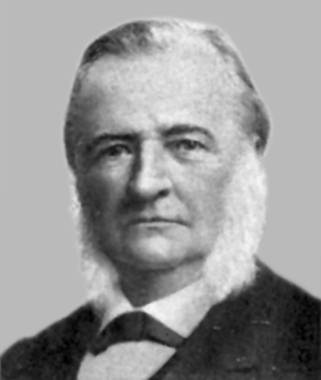
- Karl Maximovich
- Born: 23 November 1827; Tula, Tula Governorate, Russian Empire
- Died: 16 February 1891 (aged 63); St. Petersburg, Russian Empire
- Occupations: Herbarium director; botanist; explorer; plant collector
- Scientific career
- Author abbrev. (botany): Maxim.

Carl Johann Maximowicz, or Karl Ivanovich Maximovich (Russian: Карл Иванович Максимович; 23 November 1827 – 16 February 1891) was a Russian botanist. Maximovich spent most of his life studying the flora of the countries he had visited in the Far East, and naming many new species. He worked at the Saint Petersburg Botanical Gardens from 1852 as curator of the herbarium collection, becoming Director in 1869.

== History ==
Born a Baltic-German, his name at birth was Karl Ivanovich Maksimovich, but he changed it to the German version of his name for his scientific work. He graduated in biology from the Imperial University of Dorpat in 1850, he was a pupil of Alexander G. von Bunge.

From 1853 to 1857 he traveled around the world. He travelled with another Baltic-German Leopold von Schrenck to the Amur region in eastern Asia. From 1859 to 1864 he also he visited China, Korea and Japan. He arrived in Japan in late 1860, initially basing his operations in Hakodate. He traveled extensively in southern Japan and for much of 1862 including the region of Yokohama and Mount Fuji, he ended that year in Nagasaki. He also explored much of Kyūshū.

He was particularly involved with the flora of Japan, following the footsteps of notably Carl Peter Thunberg, and Philipp Franz von Siebold. His assistant in Japan was Sukawa Chonosuke, whose name was given by Maximovich to the flower Trillium tschonoskii.

He also studied the flora of Tibet, concluding that it was chiefly composed of immigrants from Mongolia and the Himalaya.

Commissioned by the Russian Academy of Sciences, he purchased from von Siebold's widow the set of eight volumes of the famous collection of Japanese botanical illustrations drawn by several Japanese artists. He was elected a Foreign Honorary Member of the American Academy of Arts and Sciences in 1888.

== Named in his honor ==
- Acer maximowiczianum: Nikko maple, China & Japan
- Atriplex maximowicziana: Maximovich's saltbush
- Betula maximowicziana: Monarch birch, Japan
- Crataegus maximowiczii Schneid.
- Kalopanax pictus var. maximowiczii: China, Manchuria, Korea, Japan 1865
- Lilium leichtlinii Hooker f. var. maximowiczii (Regel) Baker: (also named after the German botanist Max Leichtlin)
- Picea maximowiczii: Maximovich spruce, Japan
- Populus maximowiczii: Maximovich' poplar
- Maximowicz's vole (Alexandromys maximowiczii)

for more species

== Plants named by him ==
Maximovich described and named over 2300 plants which were previously unknown to science.

- Genus Circaeaster Maxim. – family Circaeasteraceae
- Acer argutum Maxim.
- Acer barbinerve Maxim.
- Acer capillipes Maxim.
- Acer miyabei Maxim.
- Acer mono Maxim.
- Acer nikoense Maxim.
- Acer tschonoskii Maxim.
- Allium monanthum Maxim.
- Berberis thunbergii Maxim.
- Buddleja alternifolia Maxim.
- Calanthe reflexa Maxim.
- Elaeagnus oldhamii Maxim.
- Goodyera macrantha Maxim.
- Juglans mandshurica Maxim.
- Liparis japonica Maxim.
- Magnolia stellata Maxim.
- Pedicularis artselaeri Maxim. – family Scrophulariaceae
- Platanthera hologlottis Maxim.
- Rhododendron schlippenbachii Maxim.
- Trichosanthes kirilowii Maxim.
- Trillium tschonoskii Maxim. - Japan, Korea, northeastern China, and far-eastern Russia
- Tulotis ussuriensis (Maxim.) Hara
- Yoania japonica Maxim.

== Selected works ==
- Rhamneae orientali-asiaticae (1866)
- Rhododendrae Asia Orientalis (1870)
- Monograph on genus Lespedeza (1873)
- Enumeratio plantarum hucusque in Mongolia : nec non adjacente parte Turkestaniae Sinensis lectarum (1889)
- Flora Tangutica : sive enumeratio plantarum regionis Tangut (AMDO) provinciae Kansu, nec non Tibetiae praesertim orientaliborealis atque tsaidam : ex collectionibus N.M. Przewalski atque G.N. Potanin (1889)
- Diagnoses plantarum novarum asiaticarum. VI
- Primitae Florae Amurensis (Flora of the Amur Region) in Bulletin de L'Académie Impériale des Sciences de St. Petersbourg (1859).
