= Hydrangea longifolia =

Scientific classification
- Kingdom: Plantae
- Clade: Tracheophytes
- Clade: Angiosperms
- Clade: Eudicots
- Clade: Asterids
- Order: Cornales
- Family: Hydrangeaceae
- Genus: Hydrangea
- Species: H. longifolia

Binomial name
- Hydrangea longifolia Hayata

Species of flowering plant

Hydrangea longifolia is a species of flowering plant in the family Hydrangeaceae endemic to Taiwan. It is an erect shrub that flowers in January. It occurs in forests at low to high elevations. It is closely related to Hydrangea involucrata from Japan.
