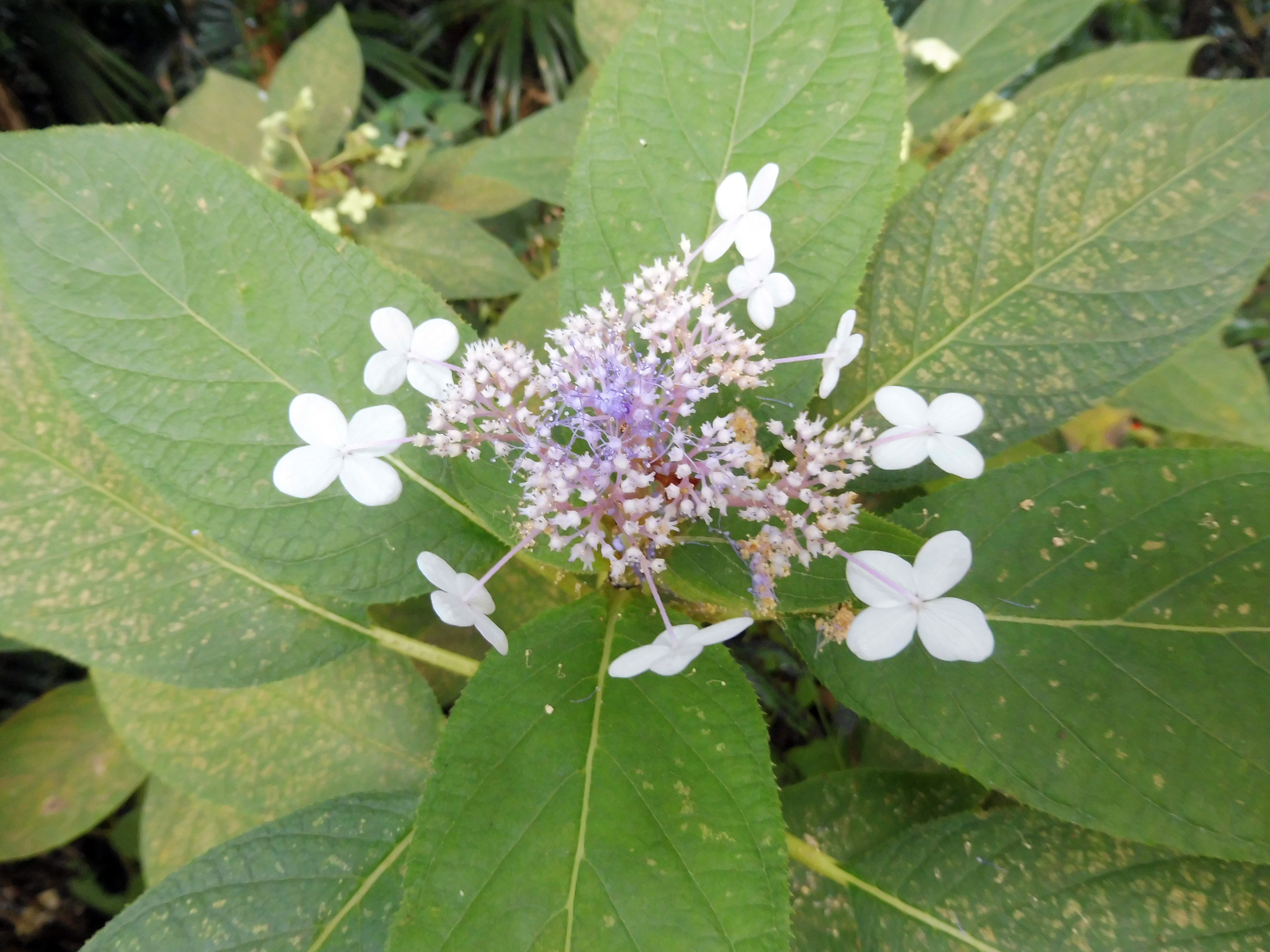

Scientific classification
- Kingdom: Plantae
- Clade: Tracheophytes
- Clade: Angiosperms
- Clade: Eudicots
- Clade: Asterids
- Order: Cornales
- Family: Hydrangeaceae
- Genus: Hydrangea
- Species: H. involucrata

Binomial name
- Hydrangea involucrata Siebold

= Hydrangea involucrata =

Species of flowering plant

Hydrangea involucrata is a species of flowering plant in the family Hydrangeaceae, native to Japan and Taiwan. It is a deciduous shrub growing to 1 m (3 ft) tall by 2 m (7 ft) broad, with oval leaves and clusters of blue or pink flowers in late summer.

The Latin involucrata means "with a ring of bracts surrounding several flowers", referring to the fringe of sterile florets.

Hydrangea involucrata is cultivated as a garden plant, and has produced several cultivars.

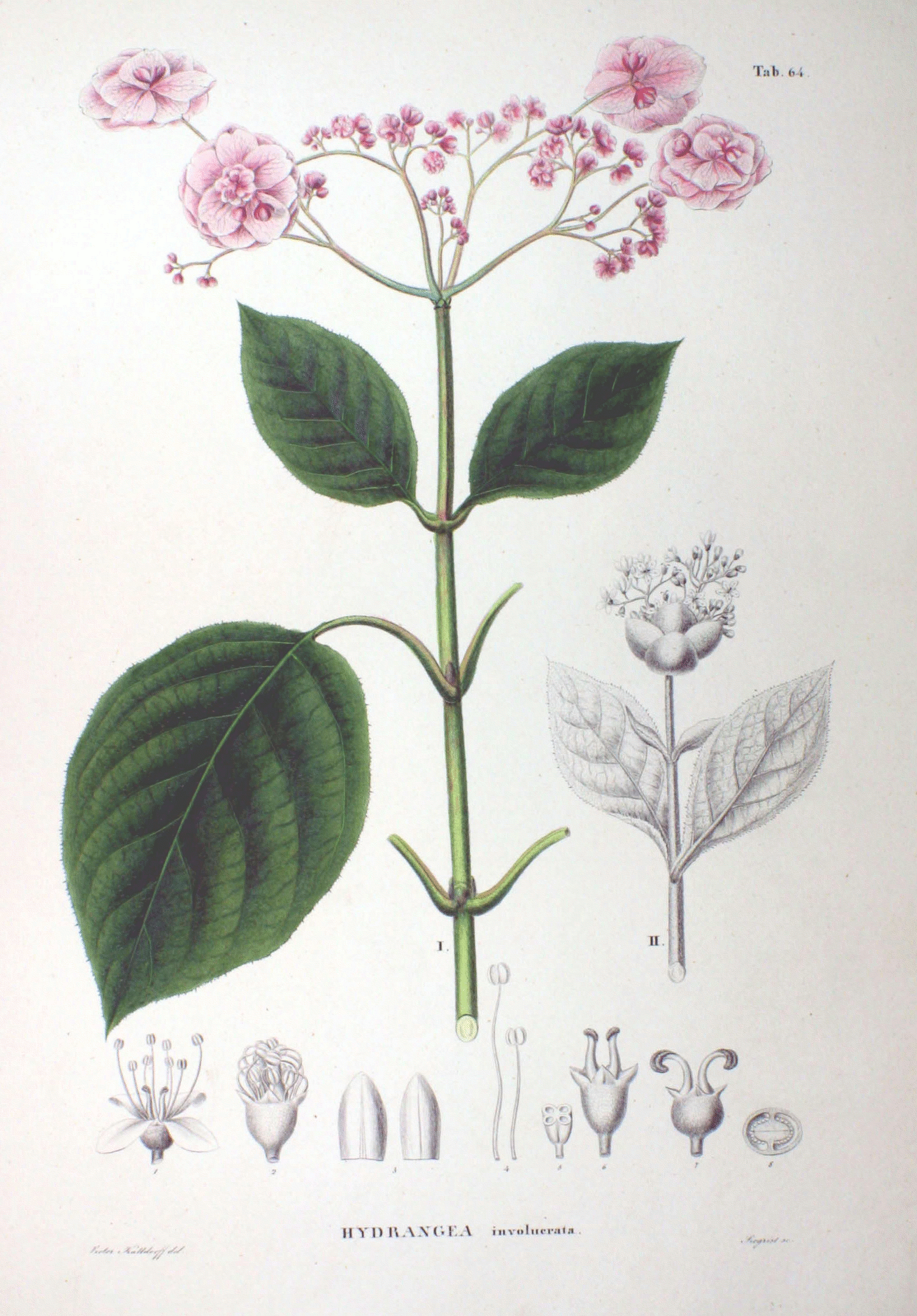
Illustration of Hydrangea involucrata
