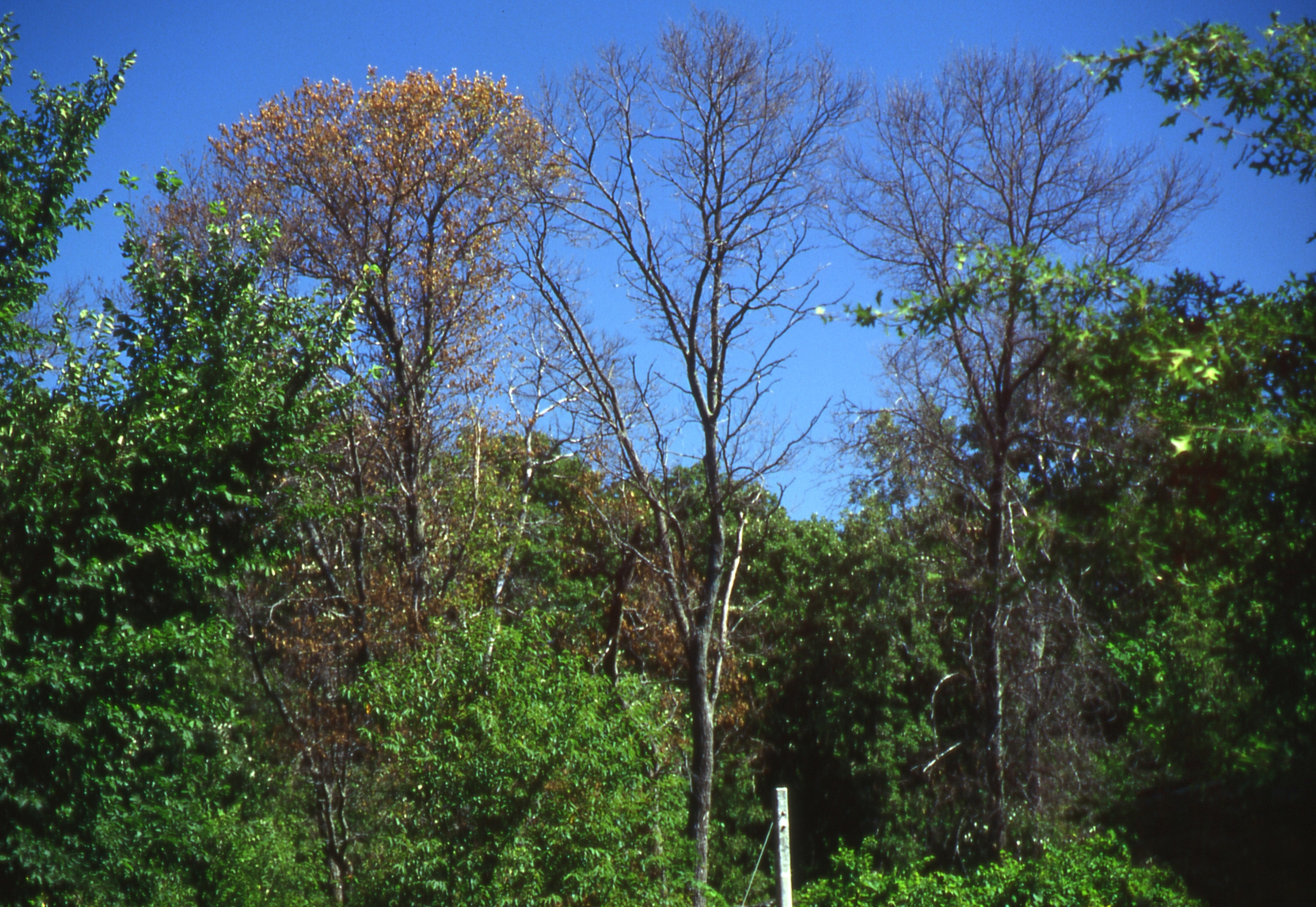
- Death of white ash caused by Candidatus Phytoplasma fraxini

Scientific classification (Candidatus)
- Domain: Bacteria
- Kingdom: Bacillati
- Phylum: Mycoplasmatota
- Class: Mollicutes
- Order: Acholeplasmatales
- Family: Acholeplasmataceae
- Genus: Candidatus Phytoplasma
- Species: Ca. P. fraxini

Binomial name
- Candidatus Phytoplasma fraxini Griffiths et al. 1999

Synonyms
- Ash yellows phytoplasma

= Phytoplasma fraxini =

Candidatus Phytoplasma fraxini

Species of bacterium

Candidatus Phytoplasma fraxini is a species of phytoplasma, a specialized group of bacteria which lack a cell wall and attack the phloem of plants. This phytoplasma causes the diseases ash yellows and lilac witches' broom.

== Taxonomy ==
Ca. Phytoplasma fraxini was first described in 1999 as the causal agent of ash yellows and lilac witches'-broom. It belongs to the 16 Sr group VII, subgroup A.

== Distribution ==
The pathogen is found in Central and North Eastern USA and Central and Eastern Canada. It was reported from Chile for the first time in 2011. It was then reported from a range of trees in Colombia. In 2017 it was reported infecting grapevine in Iran.

== Hosts ==
Ca. Phytoplasma fraxini can infect a wide range of species of Fraxinus (ash) including: white ash, narrow leaved ash, bunge ash, European ash, Oregon ash, black ash, manna ash, green ash, pumpkin ash, blue ash, Tianshan ash, Urapan and velvet ash. A number of Syringa (lilac) species and hybrids are recorded as hosts including: Syringa x diversifolia, Syringa x henryi, Syringa x josiflexa, Hungarian lilac, nodding lilac, (cut-leaf lilac), Korean lilac, Syringa x nanceiana, Syringa oblata, Persian lilac, Syringa x prestoniae, Syringa pubescens, Chengtu lilac, Syringa tomentella, late lilac, common lilac and Yunnan lilac.

In Canada, a few species of Prunus have been recorded as hosts: peach and Pembina plum.

== Diseases ==
=== Ash Yellows ===
Ash yellows
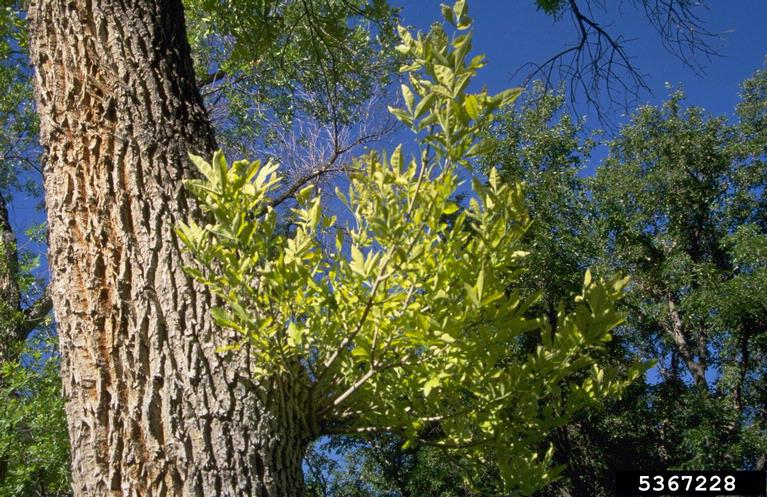
- Symptoms of ash yellows disease caused by Ca. Phytoplasma fraxini on green ash
- Causal agents: Candidatus Phytoplasma fraxini
- Hosts: Ash trees (Fraxinus)
- EPPO Code: PHYPFR
- Treatment: None

This disease is relatively new so the disease cycle is mostly unknown, although it is thought that insect vectors are used as the mode of transmission. The disease is difficult to diagnose because some symptoms match those of stressed environmental conditions such as drought, flooding, or shallow soil. When trees become infected they can survive for many years or immediately die depending on the environmental conditions and health of the tree. The major symptom of this disease is witches broom which causes branches in tufts. Unfortunately, there are not many strategies for controlling the disease besides avoiding areas where it is more prevalent.

==== Host and symptoms ====
Ash yellows refers to the disease that occurs on ash trees, usually white ash (Fraxinus americana) and green ash (Fraxinus pennsylvanica). All ages and sizes of ashes are vulnerable to infection and symptoms will occur within three years of infection. Some of these symptoms include progressive loss of vitality, subnormal growth, and leaves that fail to reach normal size and are often light green to chlorotic. Additional symptoms include branch dieback, cracks in the bark, early color change in the fall, and premature death of trees. This disease is often diagnosed by the presence of a distinct symptom known as witches broom. Witches broom occurs when there is an overgrowth of the branches of the host, resulting in a clumps of branches that resemble the head of a broom. This usually occurs near the soil line but can occur higher up in the tree as well.

==== Disease cycle ====
Not much is known about the disease cycle of ash yellows. It is unknown how exactly the Phytoplasma enters the tree and how it spreads but insect vectors are suspected. This is due to the fact that Phytoplasmas are often spread in the salivary secretions of insects during feeding. One likely candidate for spreading these Phytoplasmas, also known as Mycoplasma-like organisms (MLOs), is leafhoppers because data shows they are the most common insect vector for MLOs. Once inside the host, the Phytoplasma attacks the tree's vascular system, specifically targeting the phloem sieve tubes. Additionally, the severity of the disease symptoms caused by the Phytoplasma varies. In one study that was conducted, 12 different strains of Phytoplasmas belonging to the ash yellows group were tested and it was found that these strains varied significantly in aggressiveness and the impact they had on growth of the host.

==== Environment ====
The disease typically occurs in woodlots and forests, home landscapes, and urban settings. The geographic origin of ash yellows is unknown but currently the disease is only reported to be in North America. Some environmental factors that could contribute to the growth of the disease include mechanical damage, insect infestations, and fungi. One major environmental condition that has been shown to amplify the growth of the disease includes drought.

==== Management ====
There is no known way to cure ash yellows, so it is important to avoid growing ashes where ash yellows is prevalent. Some management strategies include promoting species diversity to reduce plant stress and limit competition among the ash trees. In addition, it can be effective to remove infected trees with dieback and place irrigation systems so that during dry periods the ashes are not as susceptible to ash yellows. One final control method is to use insecticide, however it is unclear if the use of insecticide to control leafhoppers is an effective way to prevent the spread of the Phytoplasma that causes ash yellows.

==== Importance ====
Ash yellows has been found to be present in the U.S. as well as some parts of Canada. In one study, the ash yellows Phytoplasma was discovered in 102 out of 106 ash populations that were sampled from six US states and three Canadian provinces. Within the ash populations that were sampled, 50% of the trees had crown die-back of 10% or more caused by ash yellows. In a different study that looked at the annual increase of ash yellows in six populations of white ash in New York, the average annual increase in disease incidence was found to be 4.5%. This study also found that disease incidence was lowest in the two populations where other plant species were present. The reason that all of this is of importance is that wood from ash trees can be used to make a number of products including baseball bats and furniture. In addition to this ash trees also provide food and habitat to a number of animals including cardinals and wood ducks.

=== Lilac Witches'-broom ===
Lilac witches'-broom
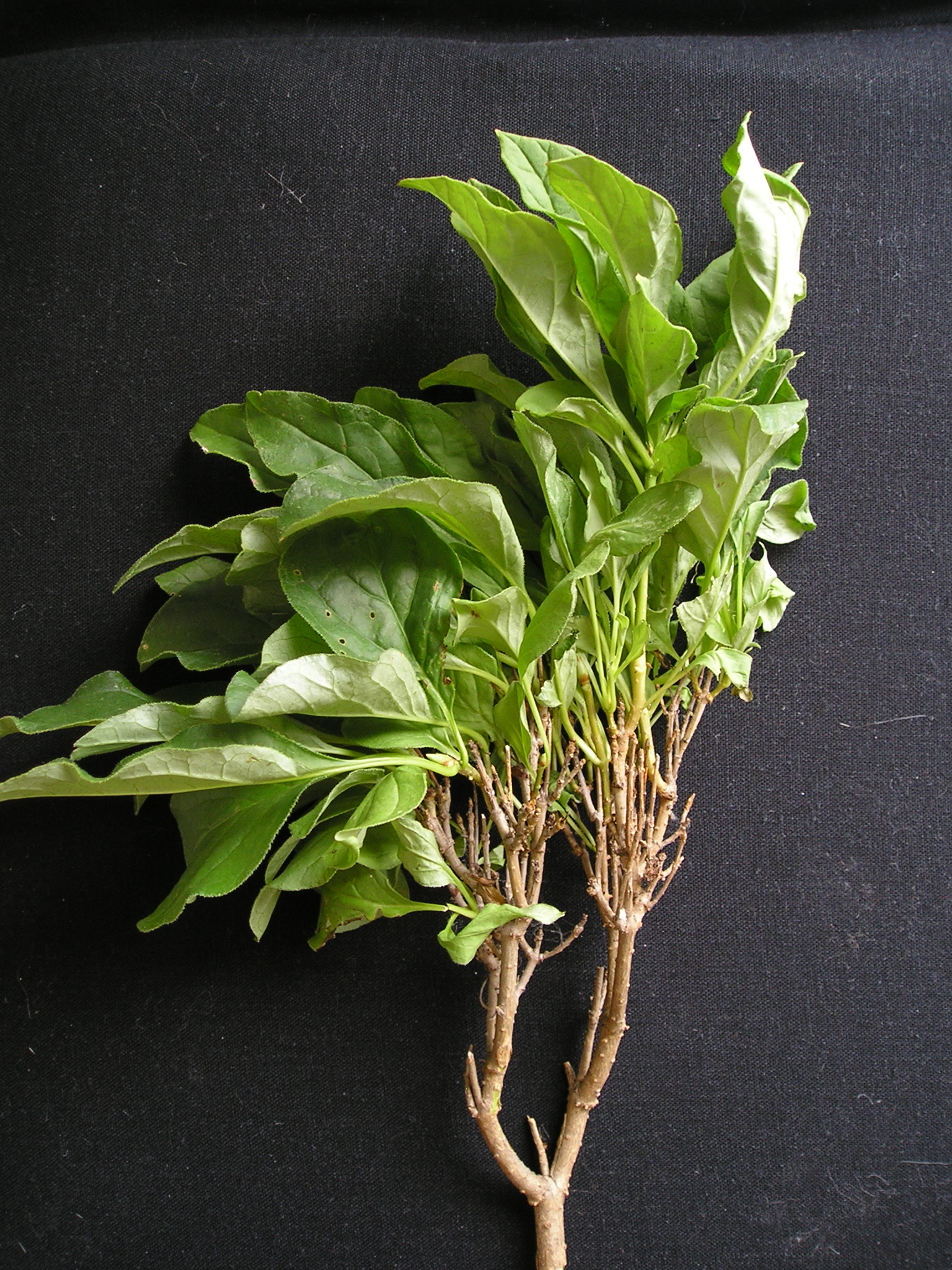
- Witches' broom from Syringa × prestonia
- Causal agents: Candidatus Phytoplasma fraxini
- Hosts: Lilac
- EPPO Code: PHYPFR

Lilac witches’-broom (LWB) is a disease of lilacs caused by Candidatus Phytoplasma fraxini. This Phytoplasma was first identified as the causal agent of Ash yellows and has since been attributed to both diseases.

Symptoms of the LWB Phytoplasma include witch's brooms, shortened internodes on new growth, twig dieback, overall loss of vitality and premature death.

== See also ==
- Aster yellows
- Elm yellows
