= Syringa × diversifolia =

Scientific classification
- Kingdom: Plantae
- Clade: Tracheophytes
- Clade: Angiosperms
- Clade: Eudicots
- Clade: Asterids
- Order: Lamiales
- Family: Oleaceae
- Genus: Syringa
- Species: S. × diversifolia

Binomial name
- Syringa × diversifolia Alfred Rehder.

Hybrid species of lilac

Syringa × diversifolia, commonly known as the varyleaf lilac, is a hybrid shrub of the genus Syringa.

== Description ==
Syringa × diversifolia is a deciduous shrub that typically grows to a height of 1 to 1.8 m (3 ft 3 in to 5 ft 11 in). Leaves are mid green, and may be entire, or multi-lobed. The name refers to the multiple shaped leaves on this lilac, one big leaf alongside two or three smaller leaves. Panicles are fragrant, and are white to pale pink. S. × diversifolia flowers relatively early in comparison to other lilacs, often flowering mid-April at Kew, while most other lilacs flower in May. The plant produces loculicidal capsules.

== Distribution and habitat ==
S. × diversifolia is a garden hybrid. Syringa × diversifolia is fully hardy to temperatures of -15°C.

== Taxonomy ==
Syringa × diversifolia is a hybrid which arose at the Arnold Arboretum in 1929. Alfred Rehder, Arnold Arboretum taxonomist, noted that Syringa pinnatifolia seedlings showed that the flowers had been pollinated by a Syringa oblata growing nearby.

The first clone produced, 'William H. Judd', is noteworthy mainly because of its variable foliage, which may produce, entire, pinnatifid or three- to five-lobed leaves.
