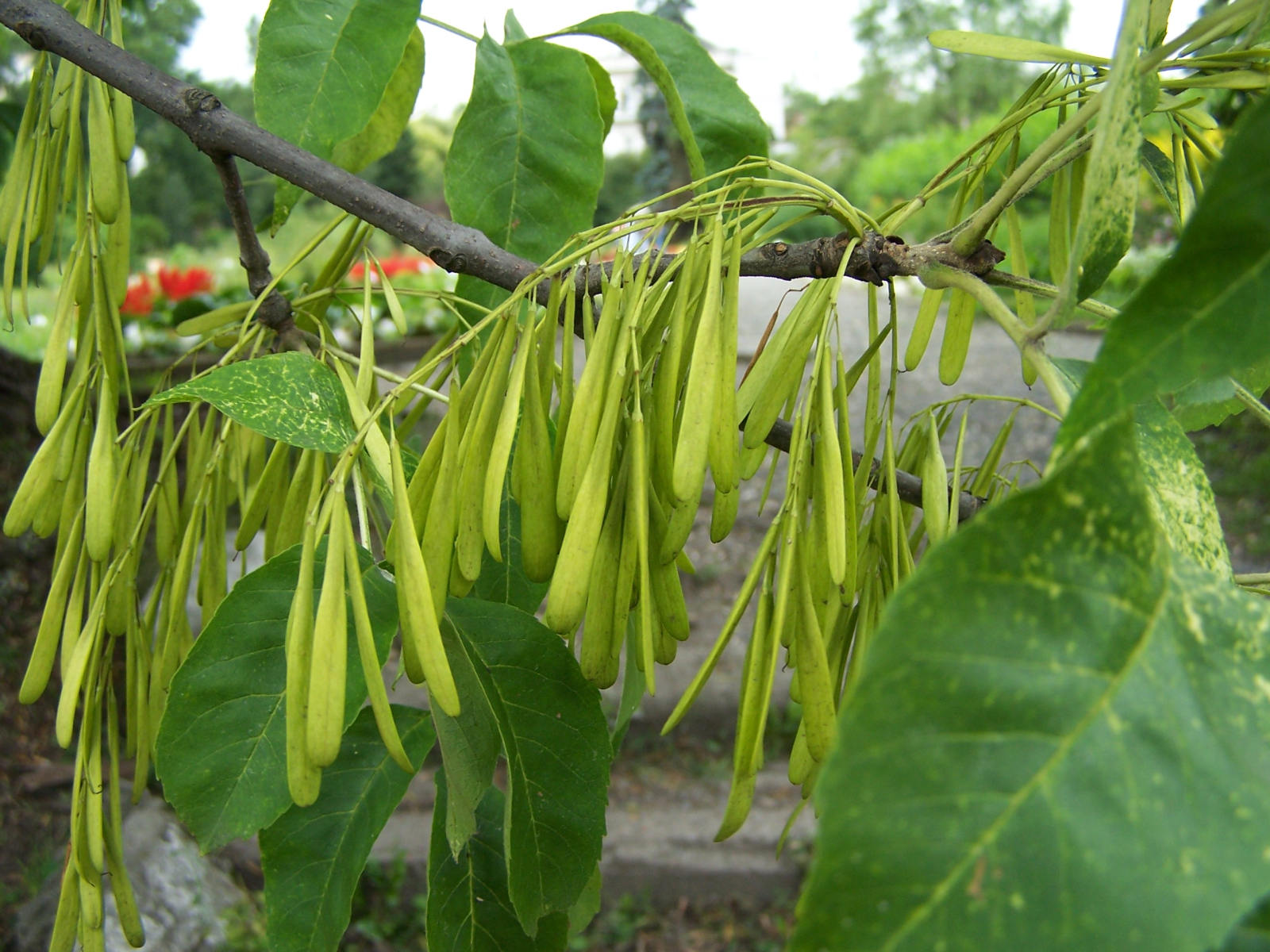
- Leaves and fruit

Conservation status
- Critically Endangered (IUCN 3.1)

- Apparently Secure (NatureServe)

Scientific classification
- Kingdom: Plantae
- Clade: Tracheophytes
- Clade: Angiosperms
- Clade: Eudicots
- Clade: Asterids
- Order: Lamiales
- Family: Oleaceae
- Genus: Fraxinus
- Section: Fraxinus sect. Melioides
- Species: F. pennsylvanica

Binomial name
- Fraxinus pennsylvanica Marshall
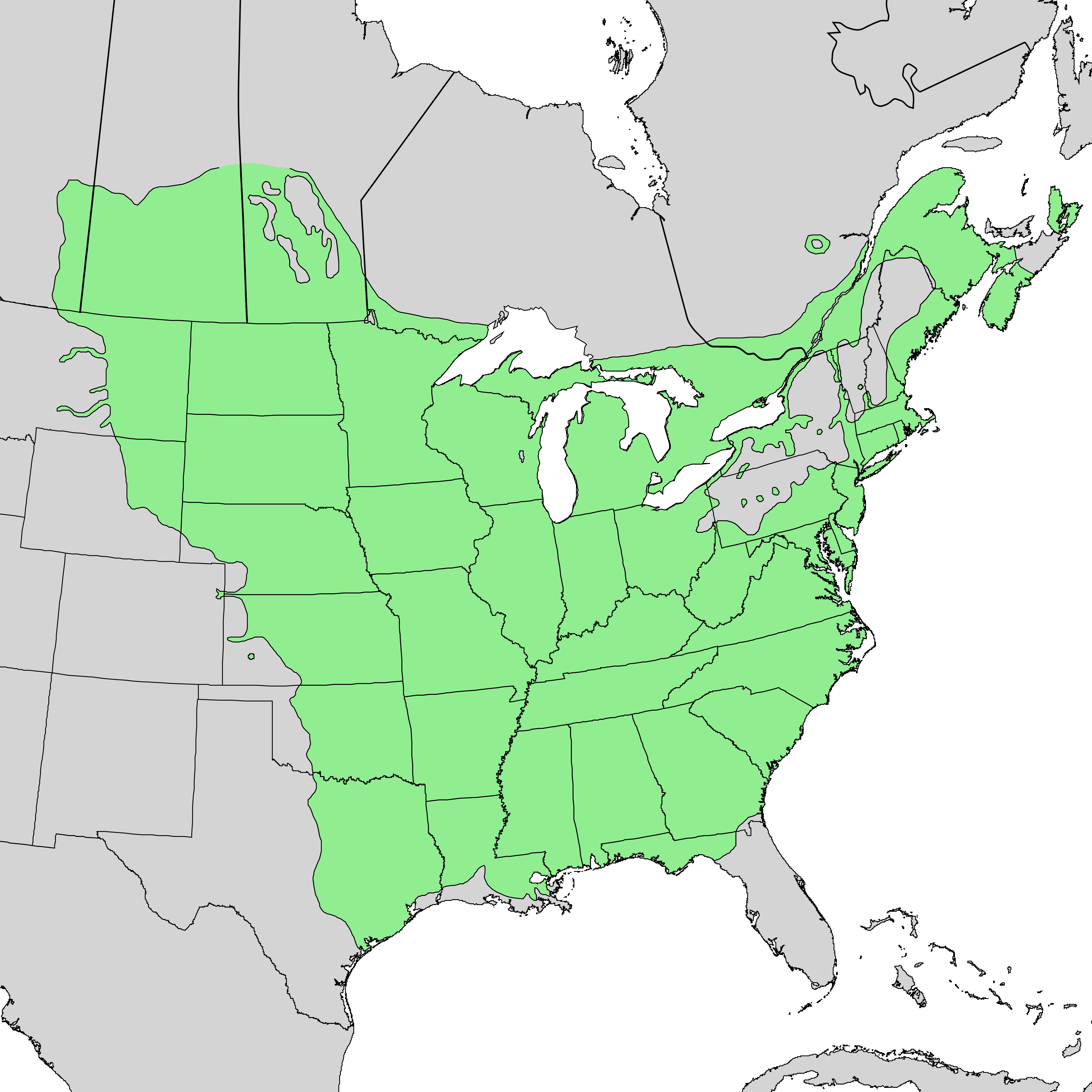
- Natural range of Fraxinus pennsylvanica

= Fraxinus pennsylvanica =

Species of ash

Fraxinus pennsylvanica, the green ash or red ash, is a species of ash native to eastern and central North America, from Nova Scotia west to southeastern Alberta and eastern Colorado, south to northern Florida, and southwest to Oklahoma and eastern Texas. It has spread and become naturalized in much of the western United States and also in Argentina and Europe, from Spain to Russia.

Other names more rarely used include downy ash, swamp ash, and water ash.

== Description ==
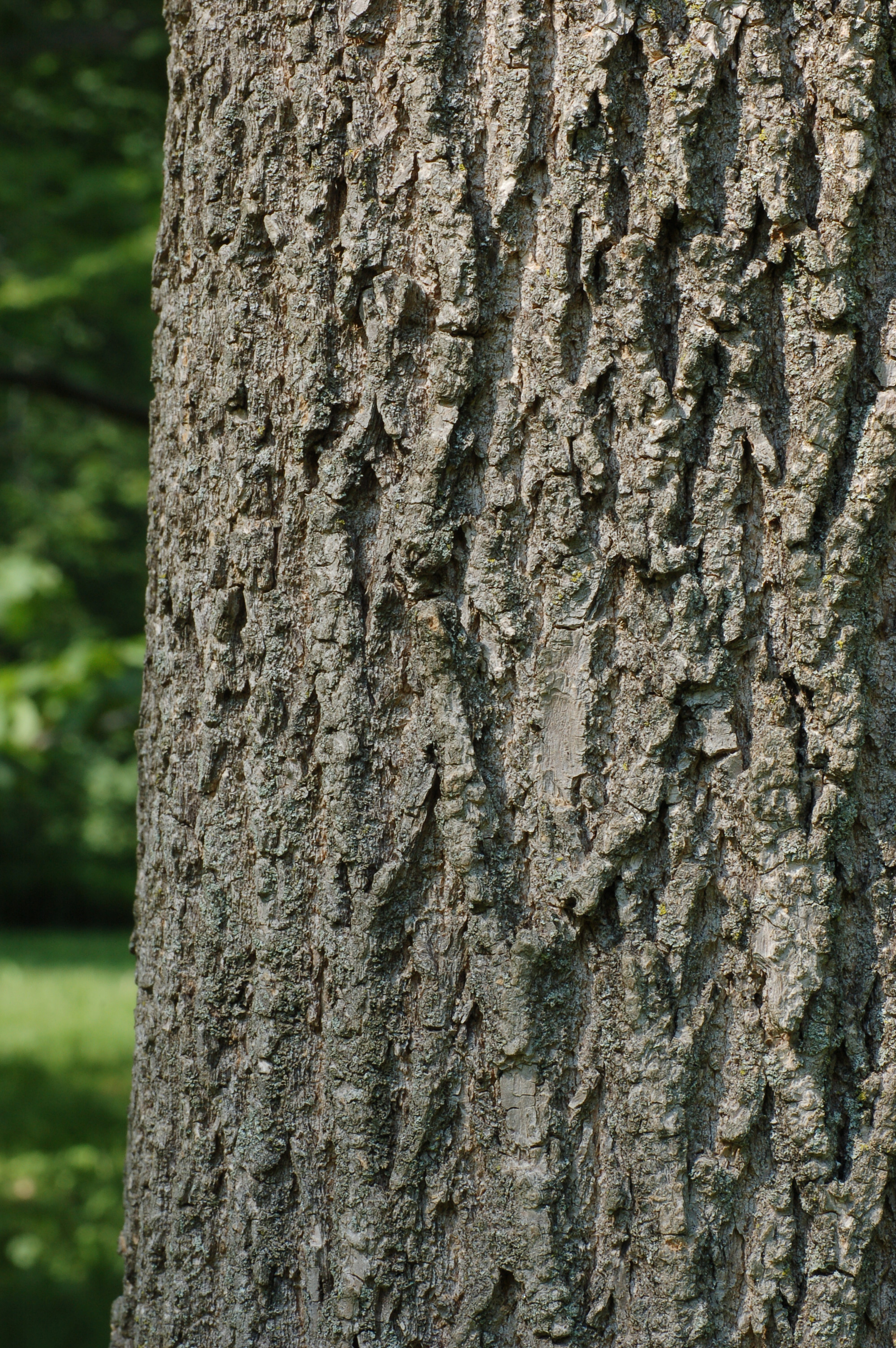
Bark

Fraxinus pennsylvanica is a medium-sized deciduous tree reaching 12–25 metres (39–82 feet) (rarely to 45 m or 148 ft) tall with a trunk up to 60 centimetres (24 inches) in diameter. The bark is smooth and gray on young trees, becoming thick and fissured with age. The winter buds are reddish-brown, with a velvety texture. The leaves are 15–30 cm (6–12 in) long, oppositely arranged, pinnately compound with seven to nine (occasionally five or eleven) leaflets, these 5–15 cm (2–6 in) (rarely 18 cm or 7 in) long and 1.2–9 cm (1/2–3 9/16 in) broad, with serrated margins and short but distinct, downy petiolules a few millimeters long. They are green both above and below. The autumn color is golden-yellow and depending on the climate, green ash's leaves may begin changing color the first week of September in the northern parts of its native range. The flowers are produced in spring at the same time as the new leaves, in compact panicles; they are inconspicuous with no petals, and are wind-pollinated. The fruit is a samara 2.5–7.5 cm (1–3 in) long comprising a single seed 1.5–3 cm (5/8–1 1/8 in) long with an elongated apical wing 2–4 cm (3/4–1 1/2 in) long and 3–7 mm (1/8–9/32 in) broad.

It is sometimes divided into two varieties, Fraxinus pennsylvanica var. pennsylvanica (red ash) and Fraxinus pennsylvanica var. lanceolata (Borkh.) Sarg. (syn. var. subintegerrima (Vahl) Fern.; green ash) on the basis of the hairless leaves with narrower leaflets of the latter, but the two intergrade completely, and the distinction is no longer upheld by most botanists.

Like other species in the section Melioides, Fraxinus pennsylvanica is dioecious, with male and female flowers produced on separate individuals.

== Ecology ==
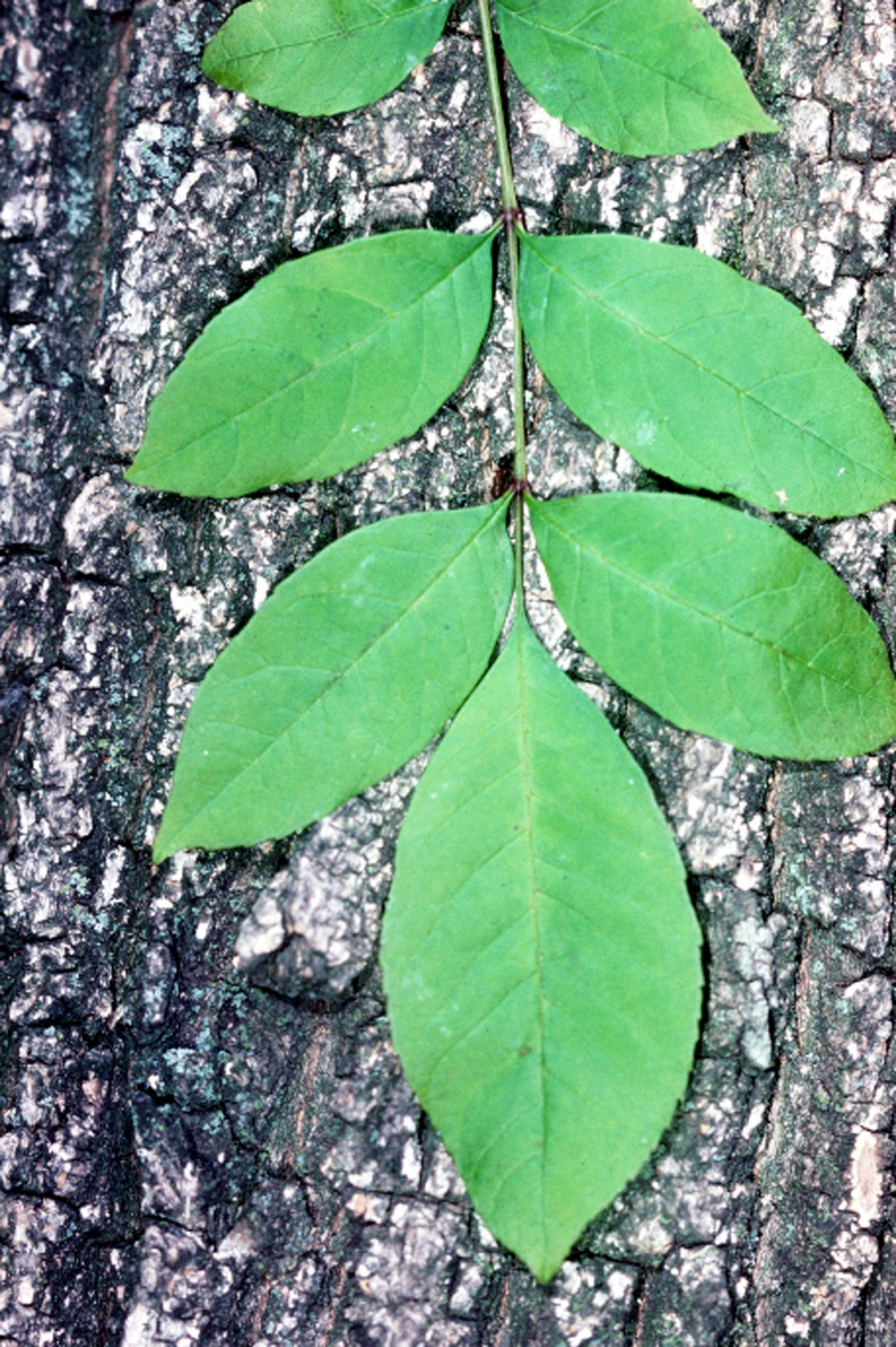
Bark and leaf

It is the most widely distributed of all the American ashes; its range centers on the midwestern U.S. and Great Plains. Seedlings of the tree have a high tolerance to water logging which may explain why the natural habitat of green ash is almost exclusively stream sides and bottomlands. The large seed crops provide food to many kinds of wildlife.

Green ash is threatened by the emerald ash borer, a beetle introduced from Asia. This introduced pest kills most ash trees that it infests, accounting for mass die-offs of ashes in North America and in Moscow, Russia. Asian ashes have a high tannin content in their leaves which makes them unpalatable to the beetle, while most American species (with the notable exception of blue ash) do not. A common garden experiment showed that green ash is killed readily when exposed to emerald ash borer, while the Asian species F. mandschurica shows resistance against emerald ash borer.

The United States Forest Service has discovered small numbers of "lingering ash" trees in the wild that have remained healthy after emerald ash borer swept through the population. The possibility of these trees possessing genetic resistance to the beetle is currently being investigated with the hope that green ash could be restored using the surviving trees. Although larval infestation by the invasive emerald ash borer kills more than 99% of green ash trees, it has been found that emerald ash borer infestation induces production of secoiridoids in infested trees and that cultivars that are progeny of "lingering ash" produce higher levels of these secoiridoids than progeny of susceptible trees.

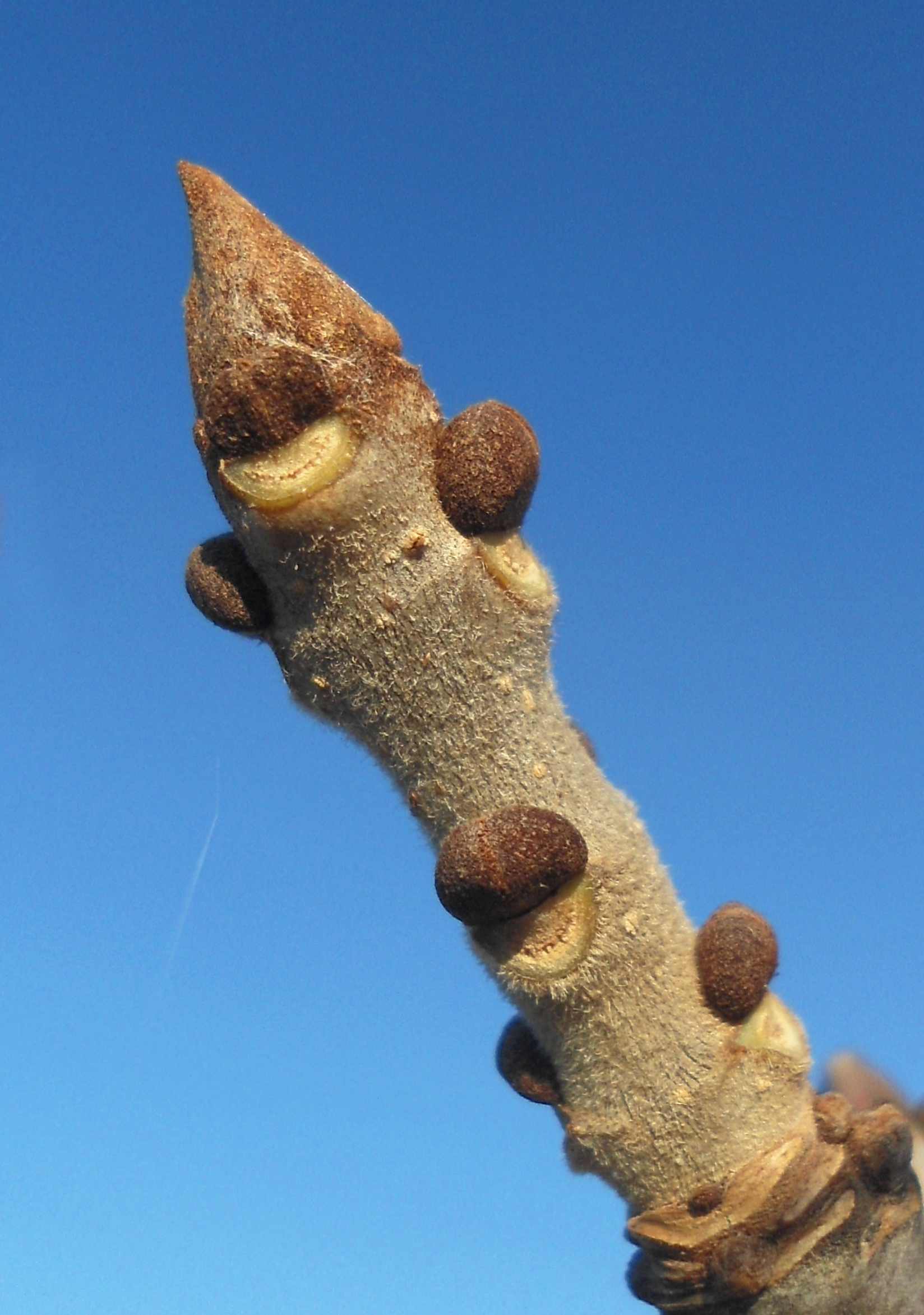
Winter twig of Fraxinus pennsylvanica. Green ash can usually be distinguished from white ash (F. americana) by its D-shaped leaf scars. In F. americana, the lateral buds are more deeply recessed within their corresponding leaf scars, giving the latter a more C-shaped appearance.

The spread of emerald ash borer was facilitated by the extensive use of green ash as an ornamental tree in the central U.S. following the loss of American elms in the 1950s–60s due to Dutch elm disease. That epidemic was the result of a similar overuse of elms in urban environments, leading to a monoculture that lacked any disease or pest resistance. Scientifically for green ash this is because modern cultivars utilized regionally were parented from sometimes only four individual trees selected for unique traits and male seedless flowering. Proclaiming a harsh lesson learned, cities like Chicago did not replace dead elms with a 1:1 ash:elm ratio. Instead, Norway, silver, red and sugar maples, honey locust, linden/basswood, redbud, crabapples, and hackberry, among others, were also utilized during this recovery period and in new urban and suburban areas. Fortunately, with these additional species, many cities were able to reduce the percent of ash and other species to much lower levels (20% average) than during the Dutch elm disease era where from 56% to 100% of the trees were elm.

Injections and spraying of ashes with pesticides has been used in city parks to protect valued trees from emerald ash borer.

Both American elm and green ash were extremely popular due to rapid growth and tolerance of urban pollution and road salt, so many housing developments in Michigan were lined from end to end with ashes, a result of which the beetles had an enormous food supply to boost their population well above infestation thresholds. The tree was also extensively propagated and sold by local nurseries. According to the American Nursery Industry, "Back in the late 1980s, Dr. Frank Santamour Jr., then a research geneticist with the U.S. National Arboretum, proposed the 10-20-30 formula for diversity in the urban forest, limiting the plantings in a community to no more than 10 percent within a single species, 20 percent within a genus and 30 percent within a family." Many communities are using a more strict 5-10-20 rule today, because of the threat posed by emerald ash borer.

Green ash is also vulnerable to many other diseases including ash yellows, ash dieback and ash bacterial canker that can cause gradual loss of vigor and exhibit similar symptoms to emerald ash borer infestation such as crown dieback, bark cracking, and epicormal sprouts. These conditions are most common on stressed trees in areas of poor soil, urban pollution, and lack of moisture. A wave of ash dieback struck the northeastern United States in the 1950s–60s that killed an estimated 70% of ashes in the region.

== Uses ==
=== Urban ornamental trees ===
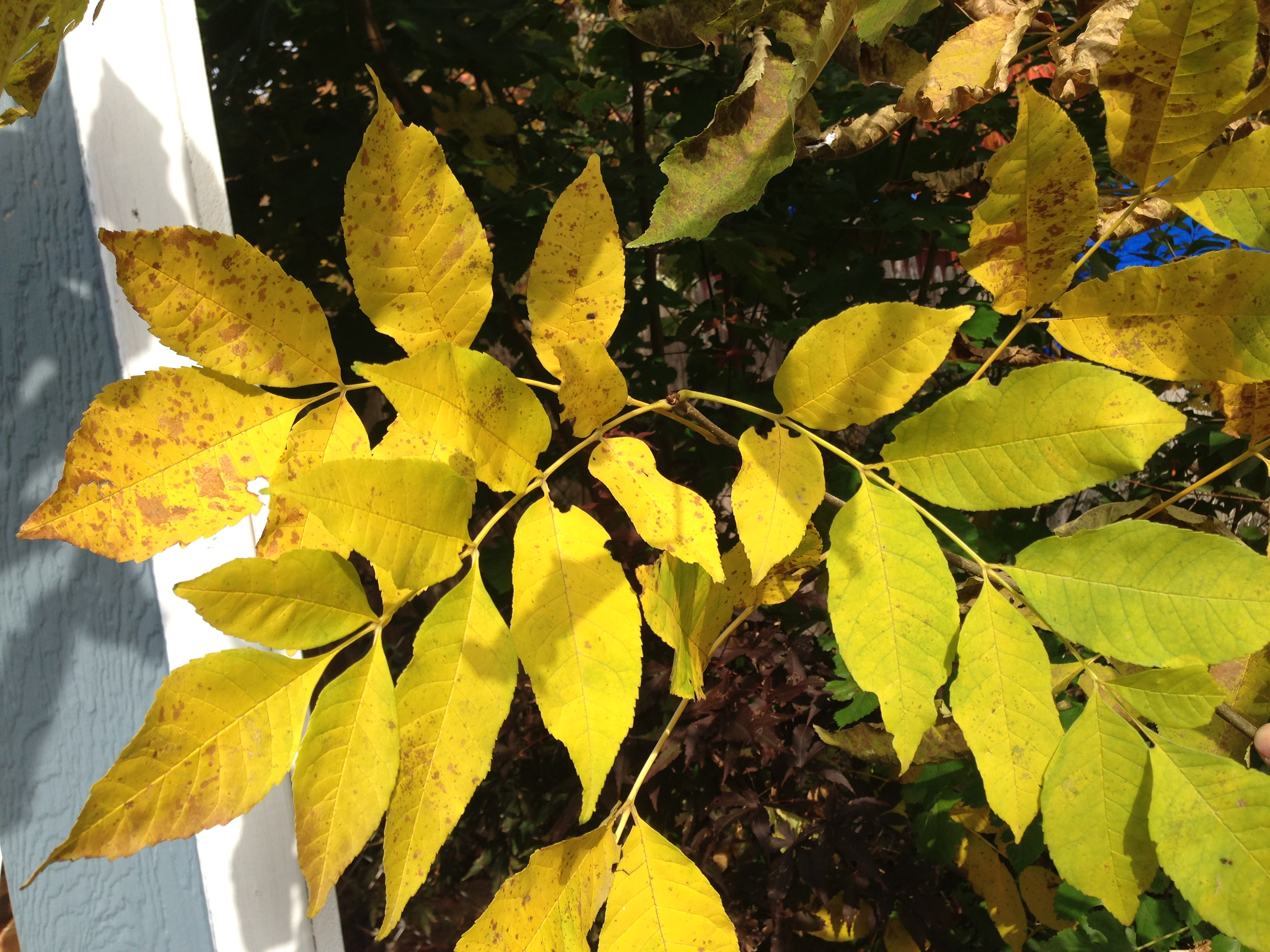
Autumn leaf color

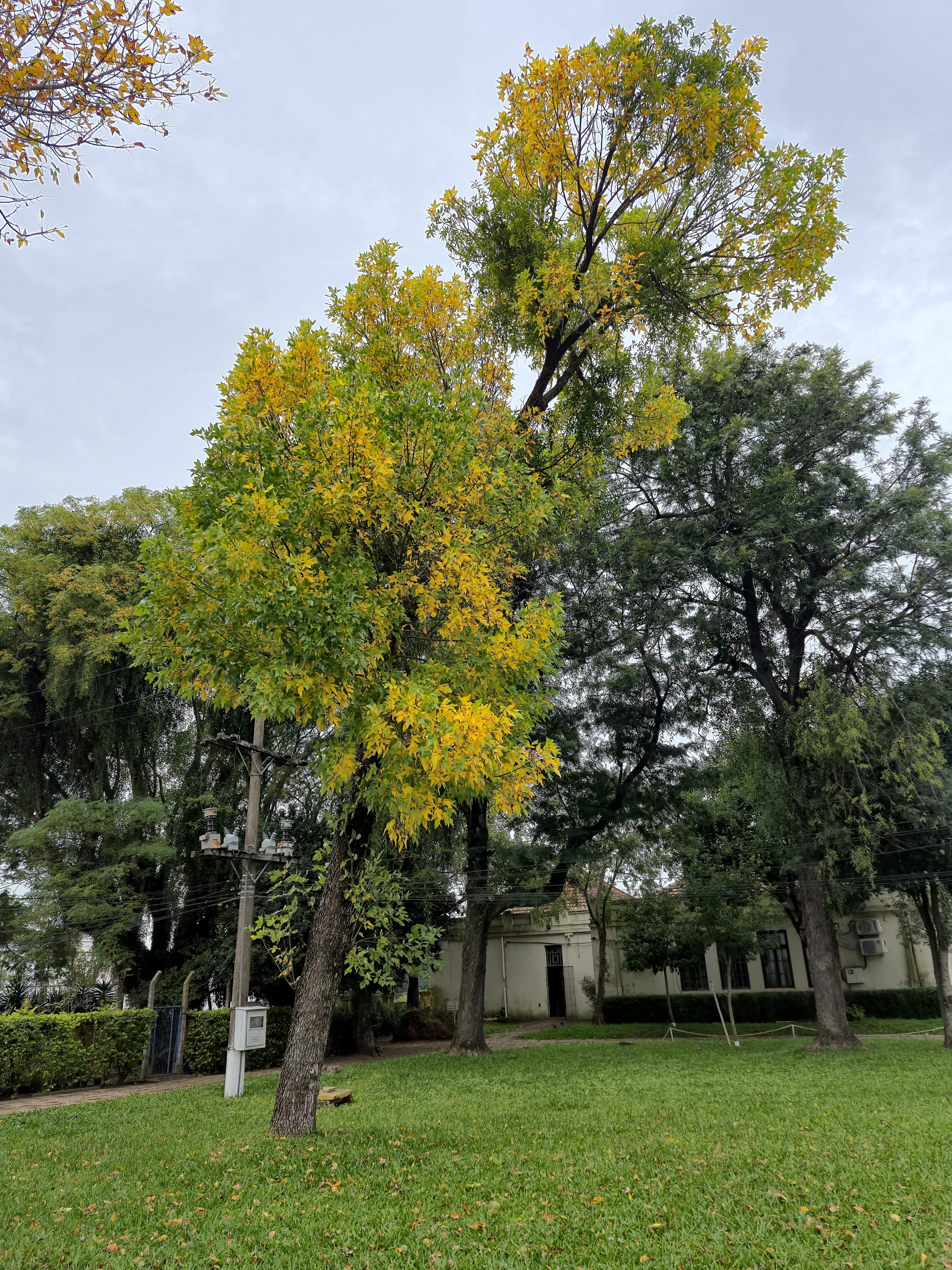
Green ash with yellowing leaves, about to fall, cultivated in Brazil.

Green ash is one of the most widely planted ornamental trees throughout the United States and much of Canada but mostly Alberta, including in western areas where it is not native. It is also widely planted in Argentina. It is very popular due to its good form and resistance to disease. About 40% of boulevard trees in Edmonton, Alberta, are green ash. It is often planted for shade or as a windbreak.

For the last two centuries American elm and ash, which both belong to the ancient Elm-Ash-Cottonwood Bottomland ecosystem, achieved distinction as North America's two most popularly planted urban species, used primarily for their superior survival traits and slowly maturing 180–300 year majestic natural beauty. Today used as living national monuments, the National Park Service is protecting Thomas Jefferson's 200-year-old planted example, and George Washington's 250-year-old white ash which has a 600-year possible lifespan. Green ash had been widely used as a primary ornamental and long lived monument tree until the elm fad of the 1880s, and regained top position once again after Dutch elm disease arrived.

Other continents learned of American ash species' urban survivability and unique beauty through the worldwide popularity of Midwestern Prairie style ecology and architectural movement. Modernizing cities in Russia and China then began using imported green ash a century ago to line streets and landscape new public parks. Advantages of green ash include its tolerance of harsh urban environmental conditions, ease of propagation, and (in eastern North America) its value for wildlife as a native keystone species.

=== Utility to wildlife ===
North American native ash tree species are used by North American frogs as a critical food source, as the leaves that fall from the trees are particularly suitable for tadpoles to feed upon in ponds (both temporary and permanent), large puddles, and other water sources. Species such as red maple, which are taking the place of ash due to the ash borer, are much less suitable for the frogs as a food source — resulting in poor frog survival rates and small frog sizes. It is the lack of tannins in the American ash varieties that makes them good for the frogs as a food source and also not resistant to the ash borer. Varieties of ash from outside North America typically have much higher tannin levels and resist the borer. Maples and various non-native invasive trees, trees that are taking the place of American ash species in the North American ecosystem, typically have much higher leaf tannin levels.

=== Other uses ===
Green ash wood is similar in properties to white ash wood, and is marketed together as "white ash". The commercial supply is mostly in the South. It is very popular, used in making electric guitars because it can be somewhat lighter than white ash without sacrificing too much in tone. It has a bright sound with long sustain, plus the wood grain is aesthetically desirable to many guitar players. Gibson, Fender, Ibanez, Warwick, and many other luthiers use ash in the construction of their guitars.
