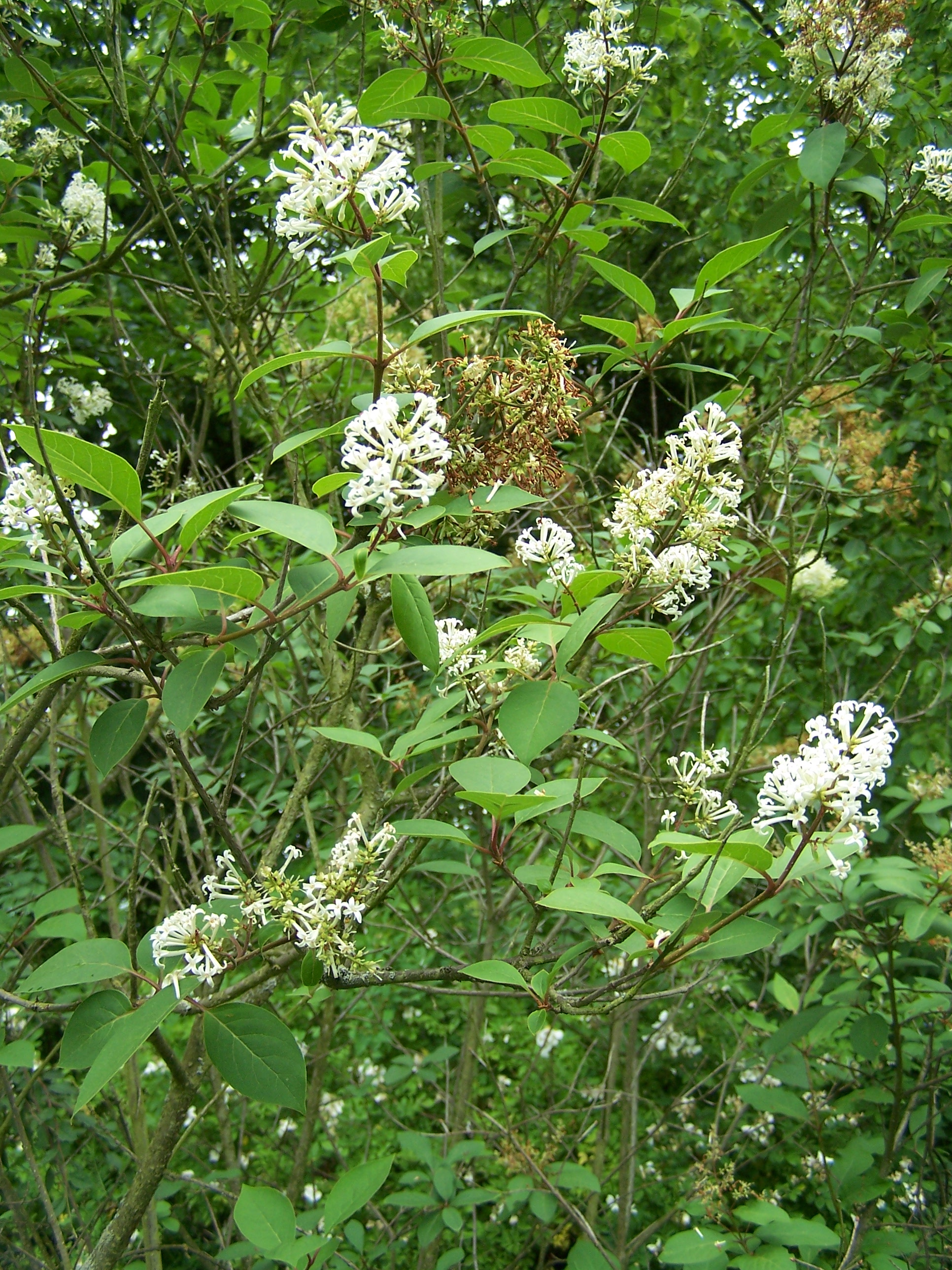

Conservation status
- Least Concern (IUCN 3.1)

Scientific classification
- Kingdom: Plantae
- Clade: Tracheophytes
- Clade: Angiosperms
- Clade: Eudicots
- Clade: Asterids
- Order: Lamiales
- Family: Oleaceae
- Genus: Syringa
- Species: S. emodi

Binomial name
- Syringa emodi Wall.

= Syringa emodi =

Species of flowering plant in the olive family

Syringa emodi is a species in the genus Syringa, in the family Oleaceae. It is also known as Himalayan lilac.

== Description ==
- Height/Spread: Shrub to 5m in height, spreading to 4m.
- Stems: Vigorous, upright branches with robust branchlets and stout shoots. Bark is silver-grey and lenticellate.
- Leaves: Leaves are elliptic-oblong, measuring 9 cm to 15 cm in length and 5 cm in width, and are dark green and glabrous above and silvery-gray and slightly pubescent beneath when young.
- Flowers: Unpleasantly scented, purple, pale lilac, or white flowers are borne on upright, terminal panicles to 15 cm long. Tube measures 1 cm in length; lobes short, valvate, linear-oblong, and hooded at the tips. Anthers protrude about halfway. Flowers in early summer, from May–June.
- Fruit: Fruits September to October.

== Habitat ==
Slopes at 2,000–3,000 m (6,600–9,800 ft) altitude.

== Distribution ==
From the highlands of Afghanistan in the west, through the western Himalayas of northern Pakistan and northwestern India (Jammu and Kashmir, Ladakh, Himachal Pradesh and Uttarakhand), to Nepal in the east.

== Cultivation ==
Widely cultivated. Notable cultivars include:

- 'Aurea'
- 'Elegantissima'
- 'Variegata'

== Etymology ==
Emodi is derived from the Sanskrit hima, meaning 'snow' (Sanskrit hima-alaya, identifies the Himalayas as the 'abode of snow'). Syringa is derived from the Greek word syrinx, meaning 'pipe' or 'tube'. Named for the use of its hollow stems to make flutes. In Greek mythology, the nymph Syringa was changed into a reed.
