= Syringa pinetorum =

Conservation status
- Least Concern (IUCN 3.1)

Scientific classification
- Kingdom: Plantae
- Clade: Embryophytes
- Clade: Tracheophytes
- Clade: Spermatophytes
- Clade: Angiosperms
- Clade: Eudicots
- Clade: Asterids
- Order: Lamiales
- Family: Oleaceae
- Genus: Syringa
- Species: S. pinetorum

Binomial name
- Syringa pinetorum W.W.Sm.

Synonyms
- Cerasus apetala (Sieb. & Zucc.) H.Ohba; Ligustrum mairei H.Lév.; Syringa chuanxiensis S.Z.Qu & X.L.Chen-; Syringa mairei (H.Lév.) Rehder; Syringa rugulosa McKelvey; Syringa wardii W.W.Sm.

Species of flowering plant

Syringa pinetorum is a species in the genus Syringa, in the family Oleaceae.

== Description ==
- Height/spread: Shrub reaching up to 1-3m high and wide at maturity.
- Stems: Cylindrical branchlets range from villous to puberulent (with fine, minute hairs), gradually becoming glabrescent.
- Leaves: Ovate to ovate-lanceolate or lanceolate, measuring 1.5-2.5 (occasionally up to 4) cm x 0.8-2 (occasionally 3) cm, papery, subglabrous or sparsely pubescent above, glabrescent below or pilose along veins. Apex is acute to acuminate, base cuneate to broadly cuneate.
- Flowers: Panicles are lateral, erect, and loose, and measure 4-16 (occasionally as much as 20) cm x 3-8 (occasionally 10) cm. Pedicel to 3mm in length, and may be either pubescent or glabrous. Calyx, reaching 1.5-3mm, pedicel, to 3mm, and rachis are usually puberulent. Corolla pale red or lilac, measuring 1-1.5 (rarely to 2) cm. Tube is cylindric, and measures 6-10 (occasionally up to 15) mm. Lobes are elliptic to ovate and spreading. Anthers are yellow and are inserted to 3mm beyond the mouth of the corolla tube. Flowers May–July.
- Fruit: Capsule is lanceolate to long elliptic and is nearly smooth, measuring 0.8-1.5 cm in length. Fruits July–September.

== Habitat ==
Valleys under pines, 2,200–3,600 m (7,200–11,800 ft) altitude.

== Distribution ==
China: Sichuan, southeastern Tibet, and northwestern Yunnan provinces.

== Cultivation ==
Not yet known in cultivation.

== Etymology ==
Pinetorum, meaning 'associated with pines, of pine woods' from the genitive plural of pinus. Syringa is derived from the Greek word syrinx, meaning 'pipe' or 'tube'. Named for the use of its hollow stems to make flutes. In Greek mythology, the nymph Syringa was changed into a reed.
