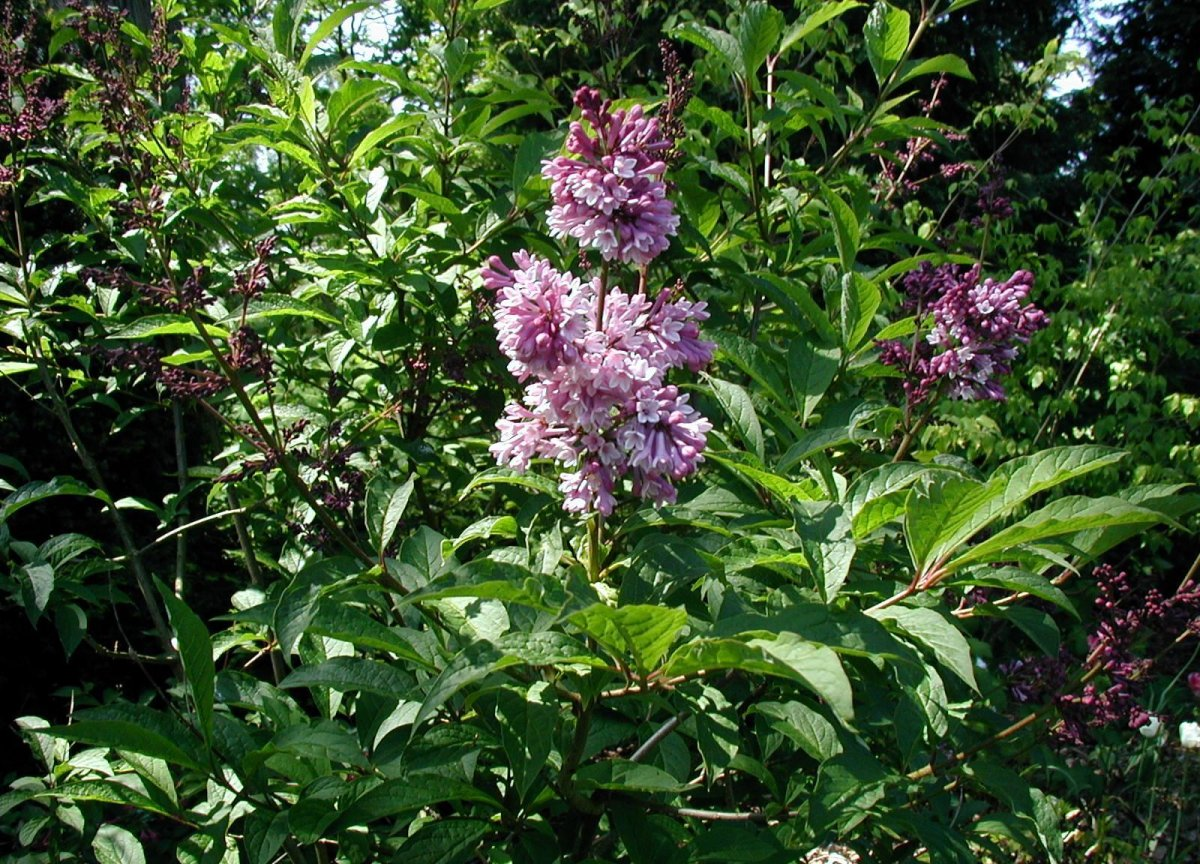

Conservation status
- Endangered (IUCN 3.1)

Scientific classification
- Kingdom: Plantae
- Clade: Embryophytes
- Clade: Tracheophytes
- Clade: Spermatophytes
- Clade: Angiosperms
- Clade: Eudicots
- Clade: Asterids
- Order: Lamiales
- Family: Oleaceae
- Genus: Syringa
- Species: S. josikaea

Binomial name
- Syringa josikaea J.Jacq. ex Rchb.

Synonyms
- Syringa × henryi var. eximia Rehder; Syringa vincetoxifolia Baumg. ex Steud.

= Syringa josikaea =

Hungarian lilac

Species of flowering plant

Syringa josikaea, the Hungarian lilac, or Lady Josika's lilac is a species of lilac in the olive family Oleaceae, native to central and eastern Europe, in the Carpathian Mountains in Romania and western Ukraine. A large shrub, it has a very restricted range, although fossils assigned to the species suggest a much wider prehistoric distribution in central Europe. Today it is threatened in the wild by habitat destruction, but is also commonly used in gardening.

== Description ==
It is a deciduous shrub growing to a height of 2–4 m (6.6–13.1 ft). The leaves are elliptic-acute, 6–12 cm (2.4–4.7 in) long, with a finely hairy margin. The flowers are dark pink, with a tubular base to the corolla 15 mm long with a narrow four-lobed apex 3–4 mm across, with a strong fragrance; they are produced in slender panicles up to 15 cm (5.9 in) long in early summer. The fruit is a dry, smooth brown capsule, splitting in two to release the two winged seeds.

== Taxonomy and former distribution ==
The Hungarian lilac belongs to the genus Syringa, which is distributed across Eurasia, with its centre of diversity in East Asia. The Hungarian lilac is one of only two species of the genus in Europe, the other being the common lilac (Syringa vulgaris) with a more southerly distribution on the Balkan Peninsula and the southern part of the Carpathians. Despite this geographical proximity, the Hungarian and the common lilac are only distant relatives within the genus. Instead, the Hungarian lilac's closest relatives are Syringa villosa and S. wolfii (under its synonym Syringa villosa subsp. wolfii) both of which are native to East Asia. These two taxa together form the sister group of the Hungarian lilac, whereby the split is estimated to have taken place during the Gelasian period in the early Pleistocene, about 1.88 Mya. This is consistent with a climatic trend of cooling and desiccation during the Eurasian Pliocene and Pleistocene, which is thought to have caused the east-west disjunctions seen in many Eurasian taxa.

Plant fossils highly similar to the Hungarian lilac have been recovered from Miocene travertine deposits in Hungary as well as Pleistocene interglacial deposits in Hungary and eastern Germany. For example, the species is known from quarries in Bilzingsleben (400 kya) and Weimar-Ehringsdorf (Note: The remains from Weimar-Ehringsdorf were initially described as a separate species Syringa thuringiaca, but later authors considered them close enough to the recent species to group the findings under the same name, Syringa josikaea.) (approx. 200 kya), both in Thuringia. This indicates that the species used to be much more widespread in Central Europe during warm Quaternary interglacial periods, and was only restricted to its current distribution area in the Carpathians during the last glacial maximum (LGM). This in turn suggests that the Carpathians served as a glacial refugium for plant species during the LGM.

== Distribution and threats ==
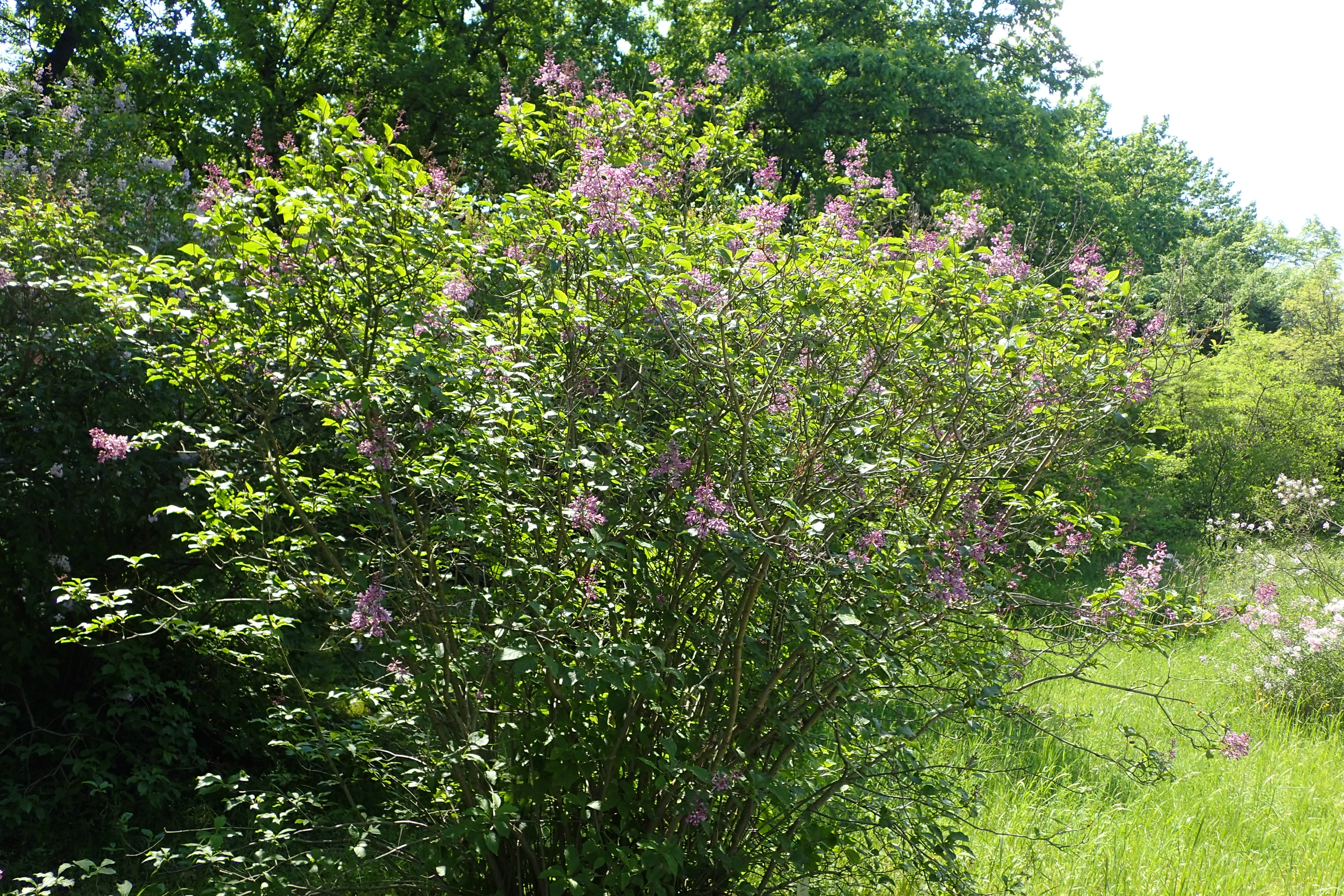
Habit

The Hungarian lilac is endemic to the Carpathians of Transylvania and western Ukraine. It occurs only in two populations in the Romanian Apuseni Mountains and the Ukrainian Carpathians, with only a handful locations known for each population. Most locations only consist of a limited number of individuals, estimated at less than 1000 for the Ukrainian population. However, the total number of individuals is difficult to estimate due to vigorous clonal reproduction, which seems to predominate over sexual reproduction. The species has declined in recent decades and is therefore listed as endangered, with populations continuing to decline. Threats are mainly anthropogenic in nature; the species suffers mainly from the destruction of its favoured habitats near streams and rivers due to road construction, river damming and habitat conversion.

== Cultivation and uses ==
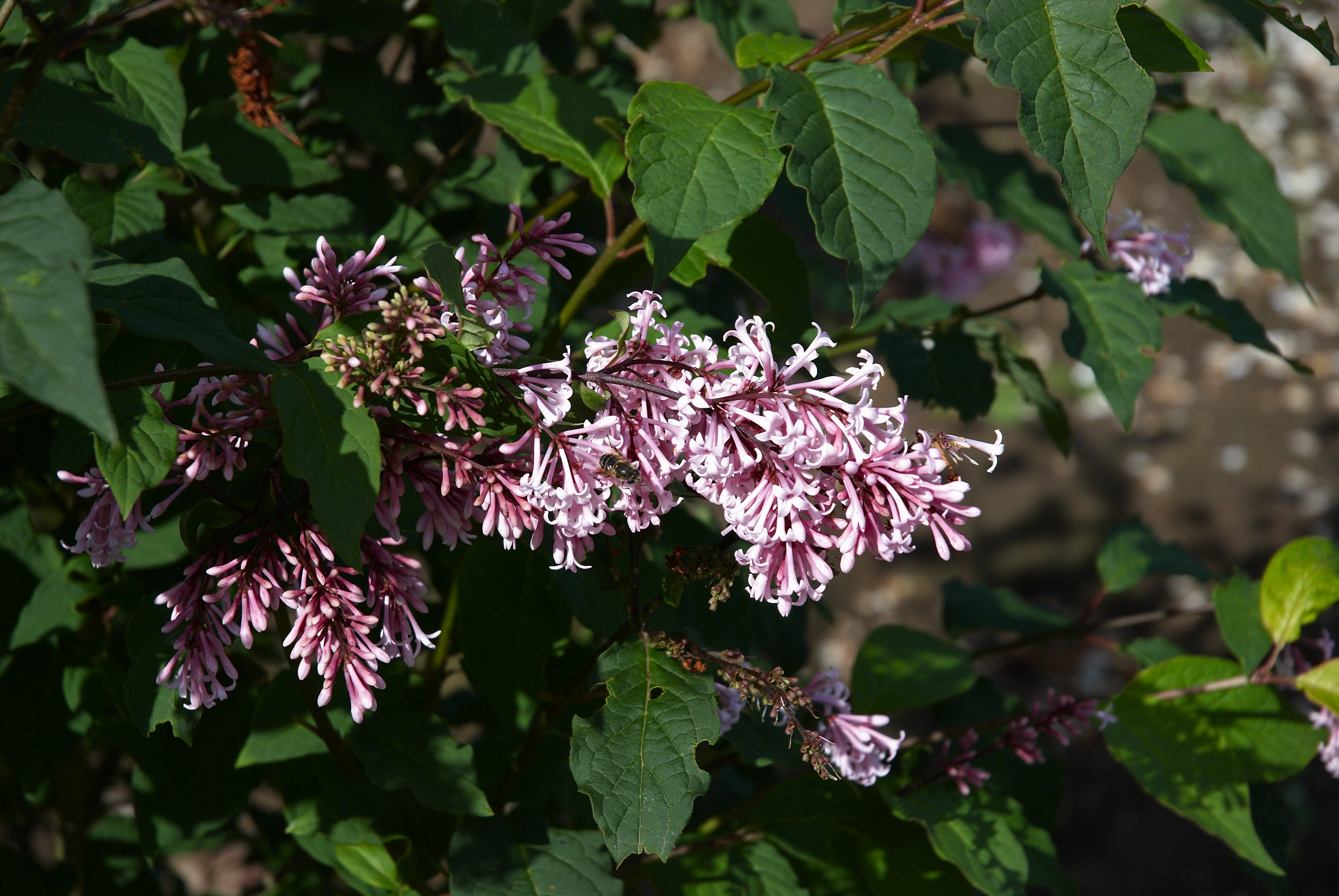
Syringa × josiflexa flowers; its parent S. josikaea differs in the corolla lobes being forward-pointing, not reflexed (a character inherited from its other parent S. komarowii).

Growing conditions allow for cool to temperate climate and are fully frost hardy. The plant also grows in full sun to semi shade. Despite its continental European origin, it has proved to be surprisingly successful when cultivated in the oceanic extremes of northwestern Europe on the Faroe Islands and in arctic northern Norway north to Kirkenes.

It has hybridised in cultivation with the closely related Syringa komarowii from China; the hybrid is named Syringa × josiflexa.
