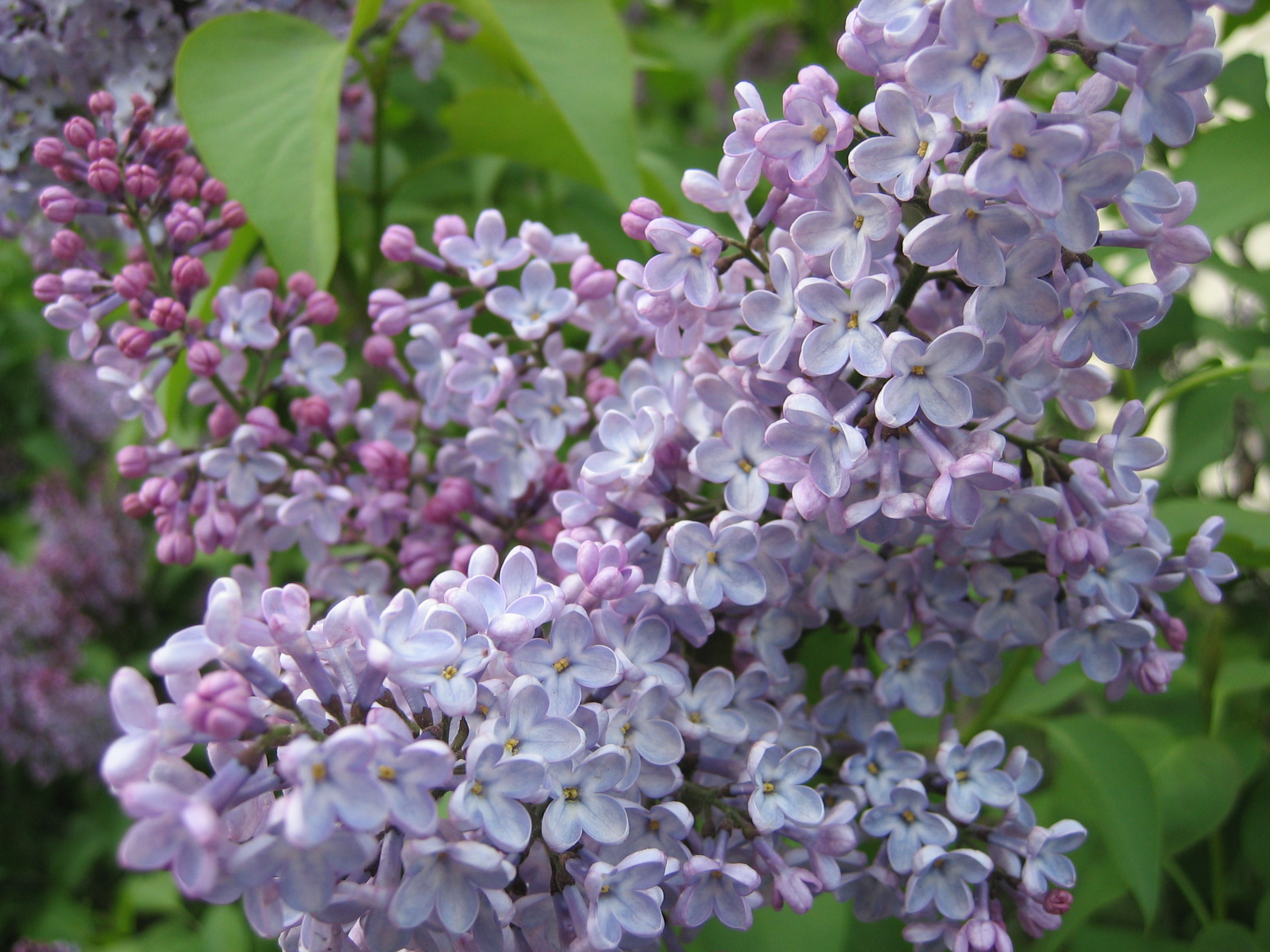
- Syringa vulgaris, common lilac

Scientific classification
- Kingdom: Plantae
- Clade: Tracheophytes
- Clade: Angiosperms
- Clade: Eudicots
- Clade: Asterids
- Order: Lamiales
- Family: Oleaceae
- Tribe: Oleeae
- Subtribe: Ligustrinae
- Genus: Syringa; L.

Synonyms
- Lilac Mill.; Liliacum Renault; Busbeckia Hécart, nom. inval.; Ligustrina Rupr.

= Syringa =

Genus of flowering plants in the lilac family

Syringa is a genus of 12 currently recognized species of flowering woody plants in the olive family known colloquially as lilacs. They are native to woodland and scrub from southeastern Europe to eastern Asia, and widely and commonly cultivated in temperate areas elsewhere.

The genus is most closely related to Ligustrum (privet), classified with it in Oleaceae tribus Oleeae subtribus Ligustrinae.

Lilacs are used as food plants by the larvae of some moth species, including lilac leaf mining moth, privet hawk moth, copper underwing, scalloped oak and Svensson's copper underwing.

== Description ==
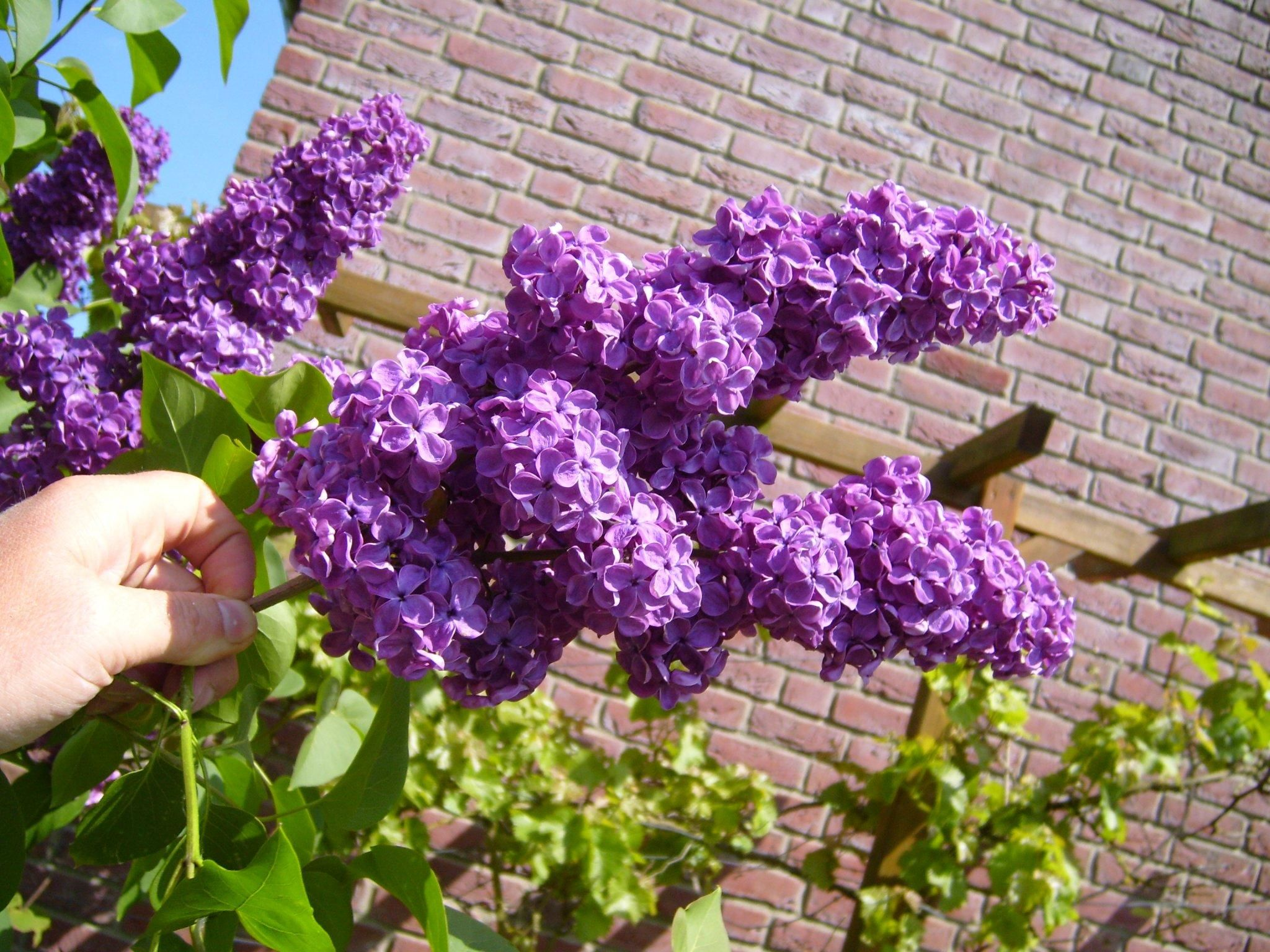
Purple lilac bush

Lilacs are small trees, ranging in size from 2 to 10 metres (6 1/2 to 33 ft) tall, with stems up to 20 to 30 centimetres (8 to 12 in) diameter. The leaves are opposite (occasionally in whorls of three) in arrangement, and their shape is simple and heart-shaped to broad lanceolate in most species, but pinnate in a few species (e.g. S. protolaciniata and S. pinnatifolia).

=== Flowers ===
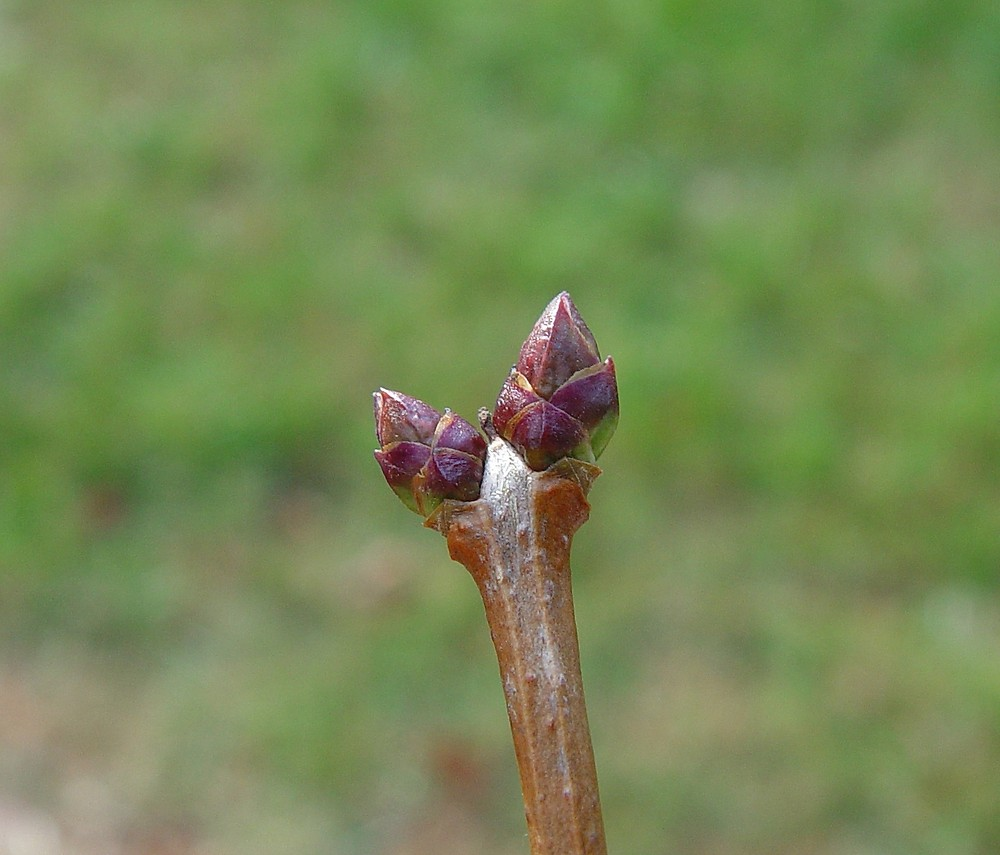
Dormant lilac buds

The flowers are produced in spring, each flower being 5 to 10 millimetres (1/4 to 3/8 in) in diameter with a four-lobed corolla, the corolla tube narrow, 5 to 20 mm (1/4 to 3/4 in) long; lilacs have bisexual flowers, with fertile stamens and stigma in each flower. The usual flower colour is a shade of purple (often a light purple or "lilac"), but white, pale yellow and pink, and even a dark burgundy color are also found.

The flowers grow in large panicles, and in several species have a strong fragrance. Flowering varies between mid-spring to early summer, depending on the species. One particular cultivar, trademark Bloomerang, first blooms in spring and then again late summer through fall.

=== Fruit ===
The fruit is a dry, brown capsule, splitting in two at maturity to release the two winged seeds.

== Taxonomy ==
The genus Syringa was first formally described in 1753 by Carl Linnaeus and the description was published in Species Plantarum. The genus name Syringa is derived from Ancient Greek word syrinx meaning "pipe" or "tube" and refers to the hollow branches of S. vulgaris.

Homonym Syringa Tourn. ex Adans. is a heterotypic synonym of Philadelphus.

=== Species ===
Species and subspecies currently accepted as of July 2016:

- Syringa emodi Wall. ex Royle – Himalayan lilac – northern India, Pakistan, Tibet, Nepal
- Syringa josikaea J.Jacq. ex Rchb.f. – Hungarian lilac – Carpathian Mountains of Romania and Ukraine
- Syringa komarowii C.K.Schneid. – nodding lilac – Gansu, Hubei, Shaanxi, Sichuan, Yunnan
- Syringa oblata Lindl. – early blooming lilac or broadleaf lilac – Korea, Gansu, Hebei, Henan, Jilin, Liaoning, Inner Mongolia, Ningxia, Qinghai, Shaanxi, Shandong, Shanxi, Sichuan
  - Syringa oblata subsp. dilatata – Korean early lilac – Nakai – Korea, Jilin, Liaoning
- Syringa pinetorum W.W.Sm. – Sichuan, Tibet, Yunnan
- Syringa pinnatifolia Hemsl. – Gansu, Inner Mongolia, Ningxia, Qinghai, Shaanxi, Sichuan
- Syringa pubescens Turcz. – Korea, Gansu, Hebei, Henan, Hubei, Jilin, Liaoning, Ningxia, Qinghai, Shaanxi, Shandong, Shanxi, Sichuan
- Syringa reticulata (Blume) H.Hara (syn. S. pekinensis) – Japanese tree lilac – Primorye, Japan, Korea, Gansu, Hebei, Heilongjiang, Henan, Jilin, Liaoning, Inner Mongolia, Ningxia, Shaanxi, Shanxi, Sichuan
- Syringa tomentella Bureau & Franch. – Sichuan, Tibet, Yunnan
- Syringa villosa Vahl – villous lilac – Primorye, Korea, Hebei, Shanxi, Heilongjiang, Jilin, Liaoning
- Syringa vulgaris L. – common lilac – native to Balkans; naturalized in western and central Europe, and many scattered locations in North America

=== Hybrids ===
- S. × chinensis (S. vulgaris × S. persica)
- S. × diversifolia (S. oblata × S. pinnatifolia)
- S. × henryi (S. josikaea × S. villosa)
- S. × hyacinthiflora (S. oblata × S. vulgaris)
- S. × josiflexa (S. josikaea × S. komarowii)
- S. × laciniata (S. protolaciniata × S. vulgaris) – cut-leaf lilac or cutleaf lilac
- S. × persica L. (syn Syringa protolaciniata) – Persian lilac – Afghanistan, Pakistan, western Himalayas, Gansu, Qinghai
- S. × prestoniae (S. komarowii × S. villosa)
- S. × swegiflexa (S. komarowii × S. sweginzowii)

== Etymology ==
The English common name "lilac" is from the French lilac via the Arabic: لِيلَك, romanized: līlak from Persian: ليلنج, romanized: lilanj meaning the indigo plant or نیلک nilak meaning "bluish"; both lilanj and nilak come from Persian نیل nīl "indigo" or نیلي nili "dark blue".

== Cultivation and uses ==
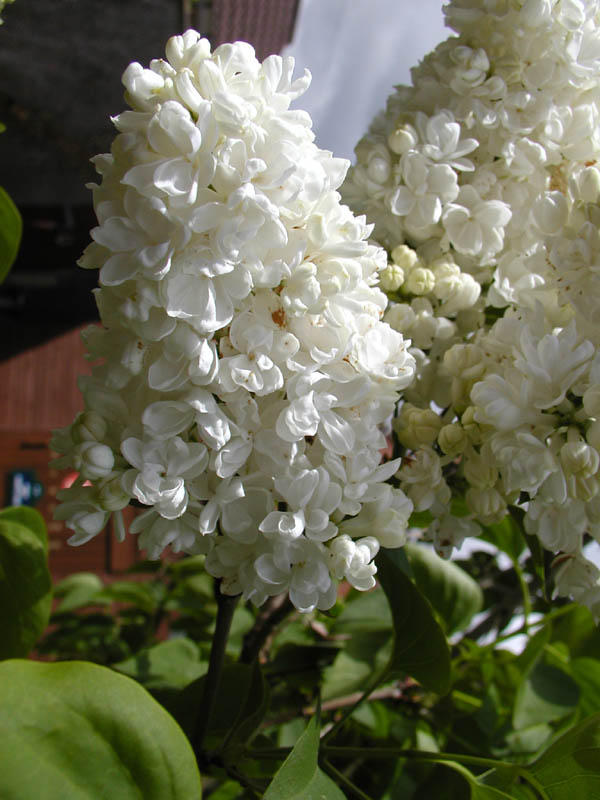
A white, double-flowered cultivar

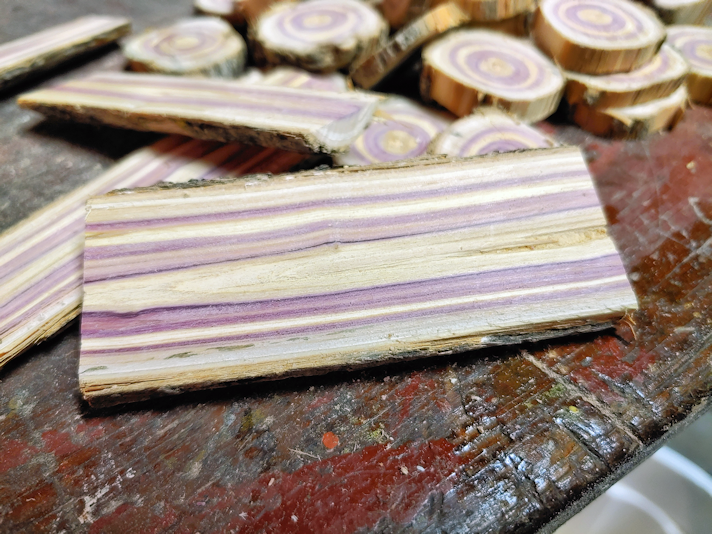
Lilac wood

Lilacs are popular shrubs in parks and gardens throughout the temperate zone, and several hybrids and numerous cultivars have been developed. The term French lilac is often used to refer to modern double-flowered cultivars, thanks to the work of prolific breeder Victor Lemoine. Lilacs grow most successfully in well-drained soils, particularly those based on chalk. They flower on old wood, and produce more flowers if unpruned. If pruned, the plant responds by producing fast-growing young vegetative growth with no flowers, in an attempt to restore the removed branches. Lilac bushes can be prone to powdery mildew disease.

Lilac wood is not commonly used or commercially harvested due to the small size of the tree. It is a relatively hard wood, with an estimated Janka hardness of 2,350 lbf (10,440 N), and is reportedly good for woodturning. The sapwood is typically cream-coloured and the heartwood can have various streaks of brown and purple.

Species have been historically used in various traditional medicines in Asia for treating ailments including cough, diarrhea, acute icteric hepatitis, vomiting, abdominal pain, and bronchitis. Compounds isolated from species of Syringa include phenylpropanoids such as syringin and iridoids such as oleuropein. Substituent compounds, such as iridoids, as well as crude extracts from Syringa plants have been shown to have effects including antitumor, antihypertensive, anti-inflammatory, antioxidant, and antifungal activities in pharmacological studies.

== Symbolism ==
Lilacs are often considered to symbolize first love.

In Greece, Macedonia, Lebanon, and Cyprus, the lilac is strongly associated with Easter time because it flowers around that time; it is consequently called paschalia.

In the poem When Lilacs Last in the Dooryard Bloom'd, by Walt Whitman, lilacs are a reference to Abraham Lincoln.

The music-hall song by Ivor Novello, We'll Gather Lilacs, first performed in 1945, speaks of the longing of two lovers to be reunited in a traditional English rural setting. It has since been recorded and performed by numerous artists.

Syringa vulgaris is the state flower of New Hampshire, because it "is symbolic of that hardy character of the men and women of the Granite State."

Lilac is significant in the Discworld novel Night Watch as the impromptu badge for John Keel's side and is noted for being whippy, tough, and difficult to kill.

== Festivals ==
Lilacs showcased in the Lilac Celebration held each May at the Royal Botanical Gardens, Ontario, Canada

Several locations in North America hold annual Lilac Festivals, including:

- The Arnold Arboretum in Boston, Massachusetts, which celebrates "Lilac Sunday" every May. The Arboretum shows off its collection of over 422 lilac plants, of 194 different varieties. Lilac Sunday is the only day of the year when picnicking is allowed on the grounds of the Arboretum.
- Lombard, Illinois, called the "Lilac Village", which has an annual lilac festival and parade in May. The village also contains Lilacia Park, a garden with over 200 varieties of lilacs, as well as over 50 kinds of tulips.
- Mackinac Island, in Michigan, which celebrates a weeklong lilac festival and lilac parade each June.
- Rochester, New York, which has held its Lilac Festival since 1898, hosts the longest-running festival in North America. Held in Highland Park, this celebration features 1,200 shrubs, representing over 500 varieties, many of which were developed in Rochester. It is the largest collection of varieties at any single place.
- The Royal Botanical Gardens near Hamilton, Ontario, which holds its Lilac Celebration each May.
- Spokane, Washington, known as the "Lilac City", which holds an annual lilac festival and lilac parade.
- Franktown, Ontario, Canada, known as the Lilac Capital of Canada, holds an annual festival. With drystone masonry demonstrations and horse pulled wagon rides.
- Calgary, Alberta, Canada, holds an annual one-day Lilac Festival, which is primarily a street festival.

== Gallery ==
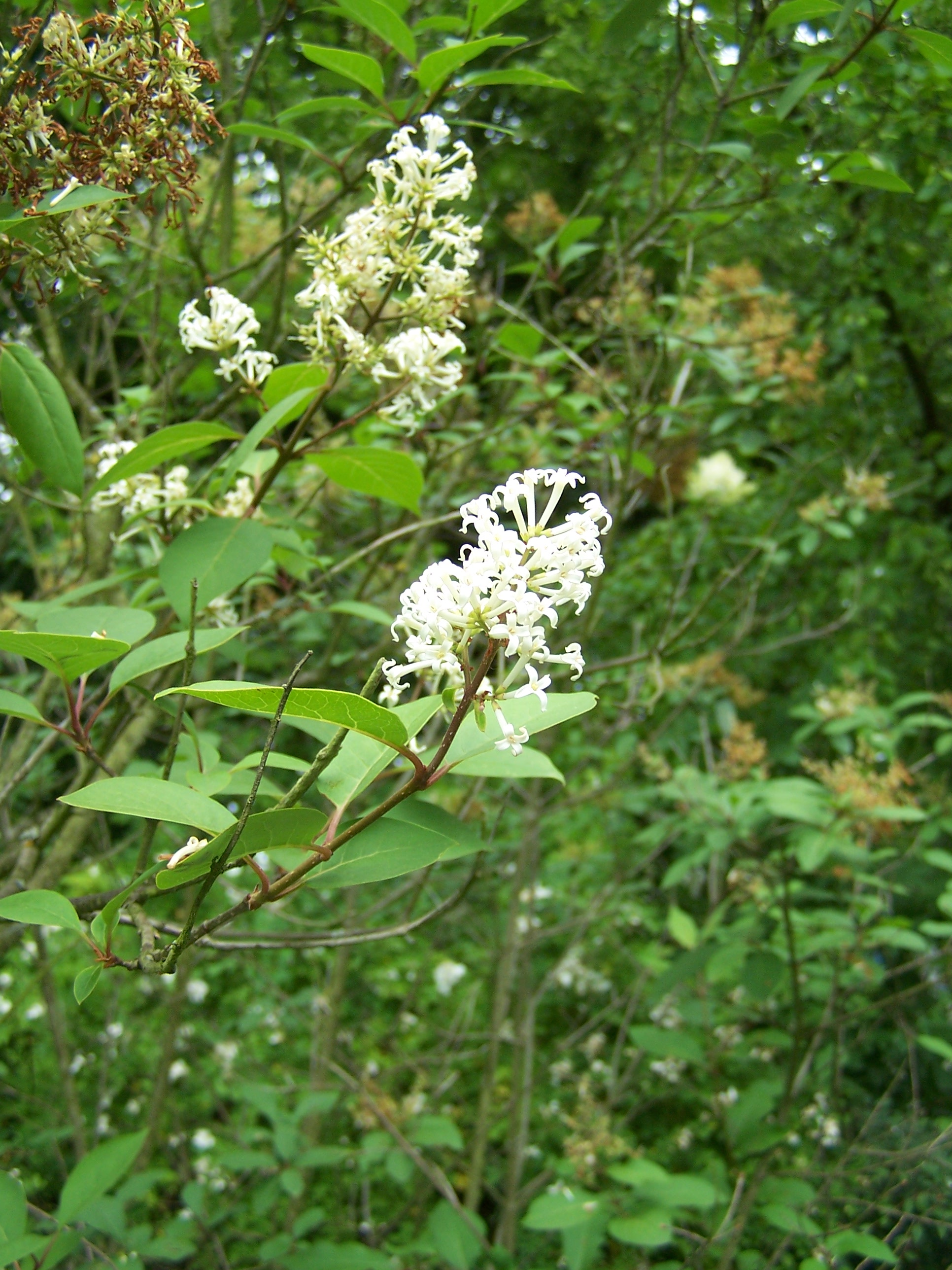
Syringa emodi flowers

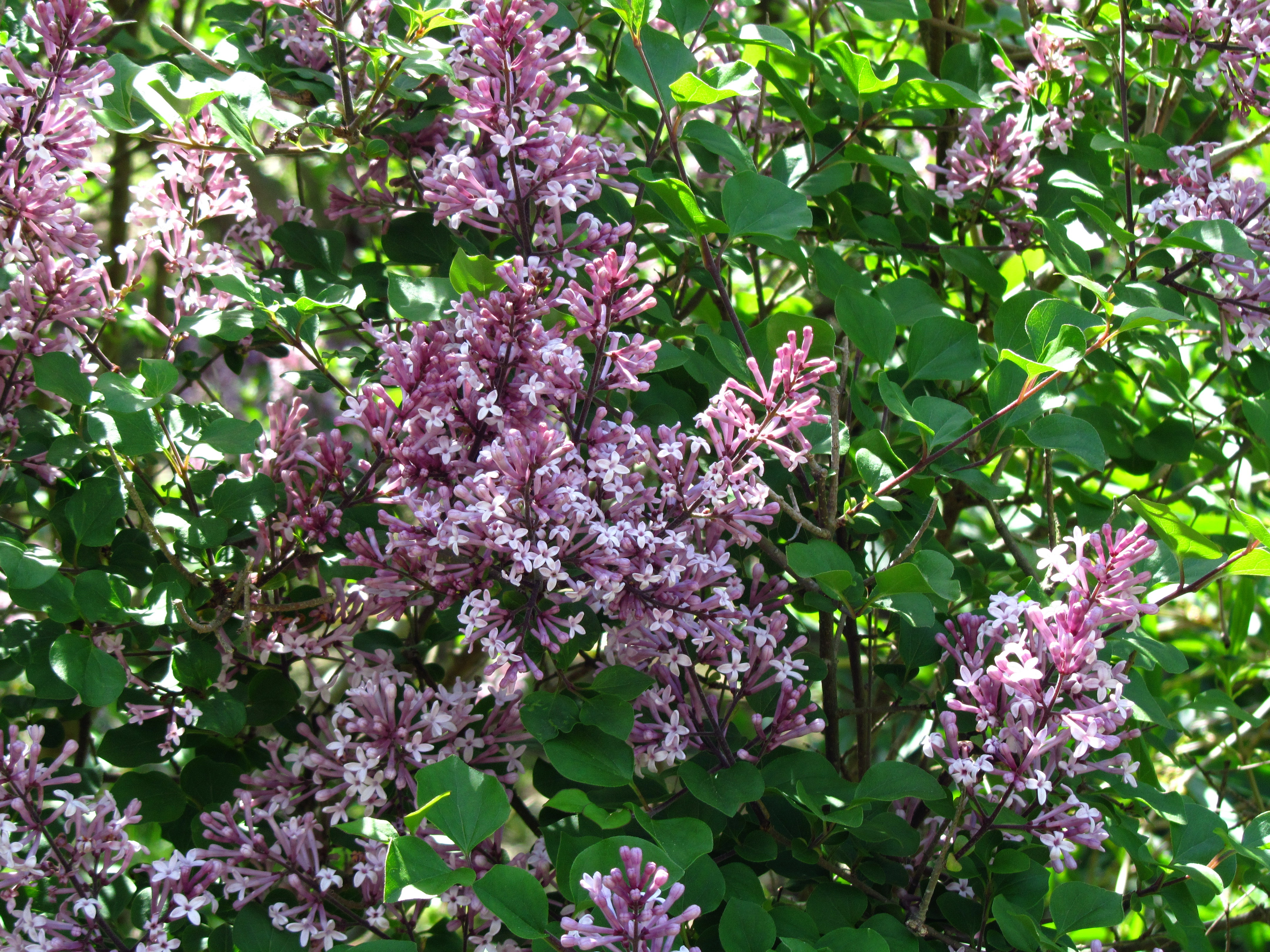
S. meyeri 'Palibin'

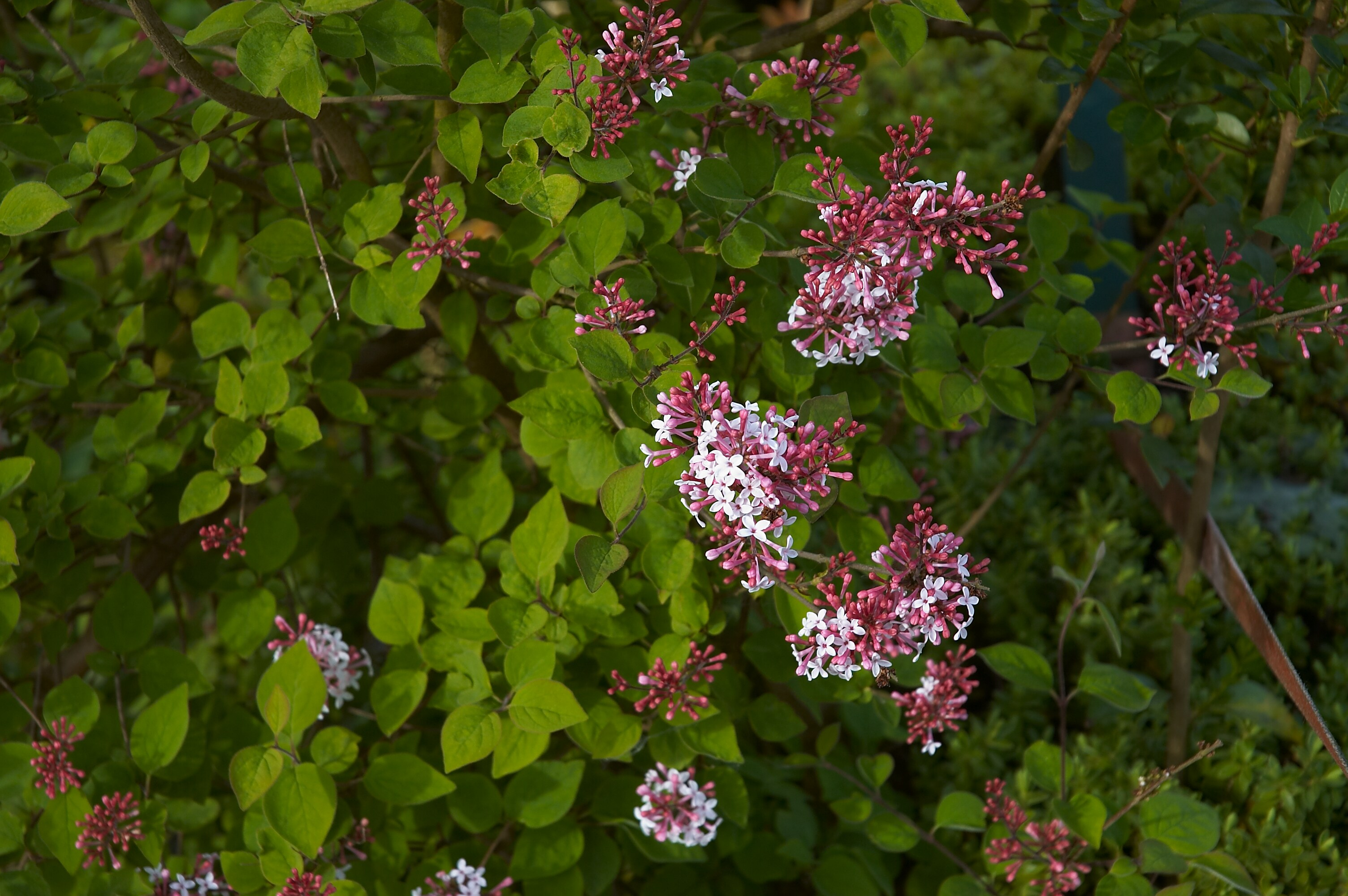
S. microphylla

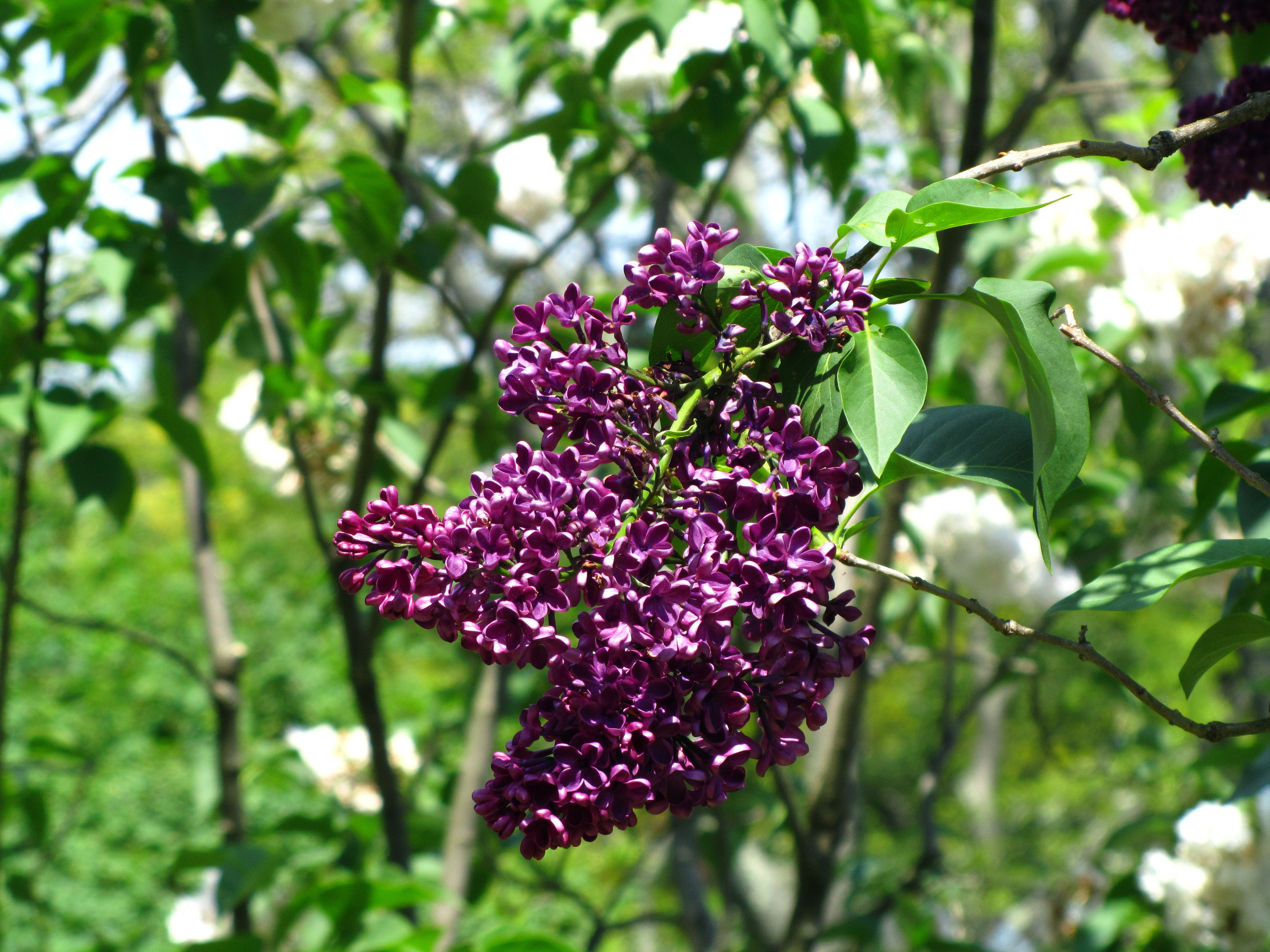
S. vulgaris 'Sarah Sands'

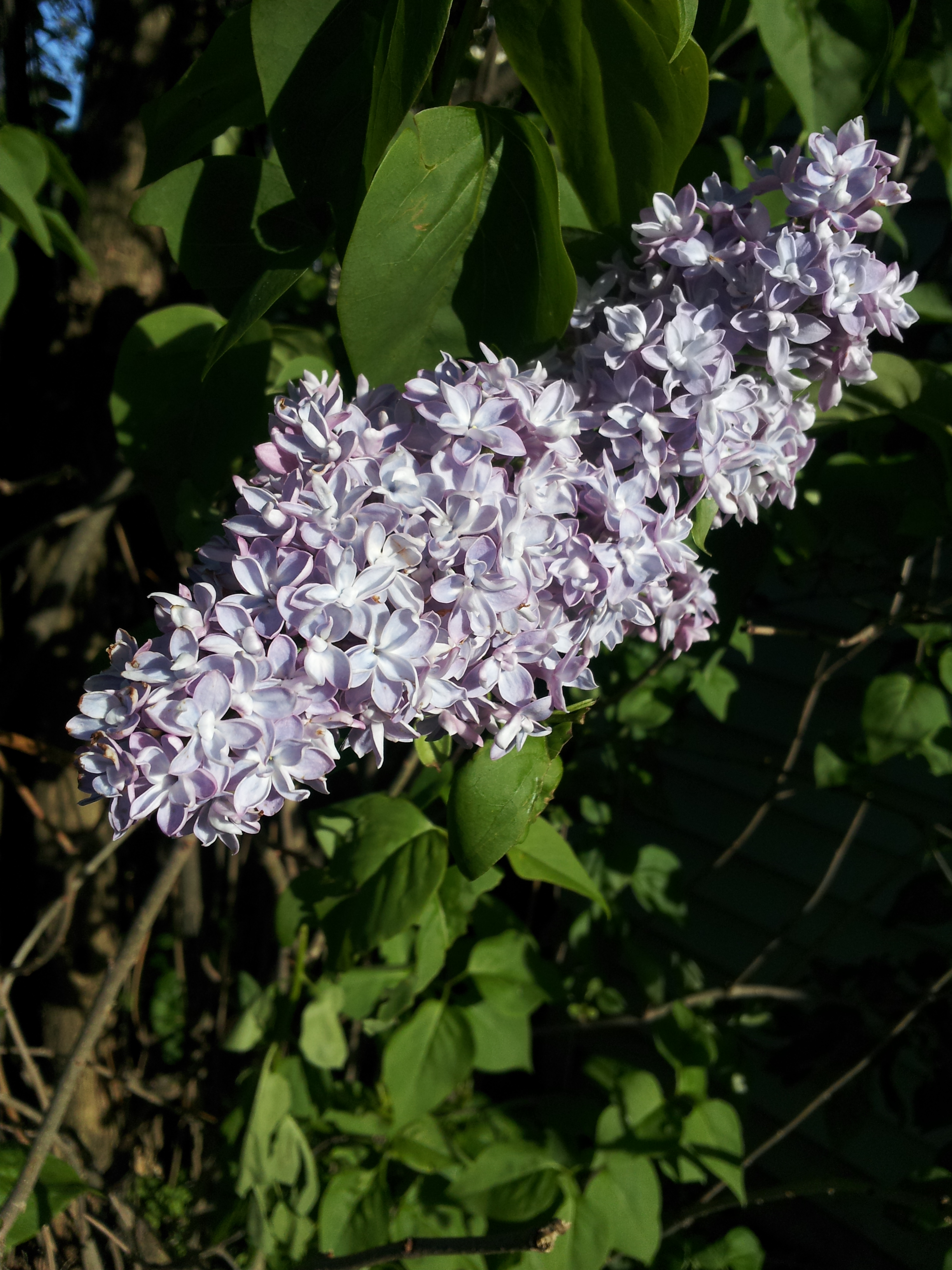
A double-flowered S. vulgaris cultivar

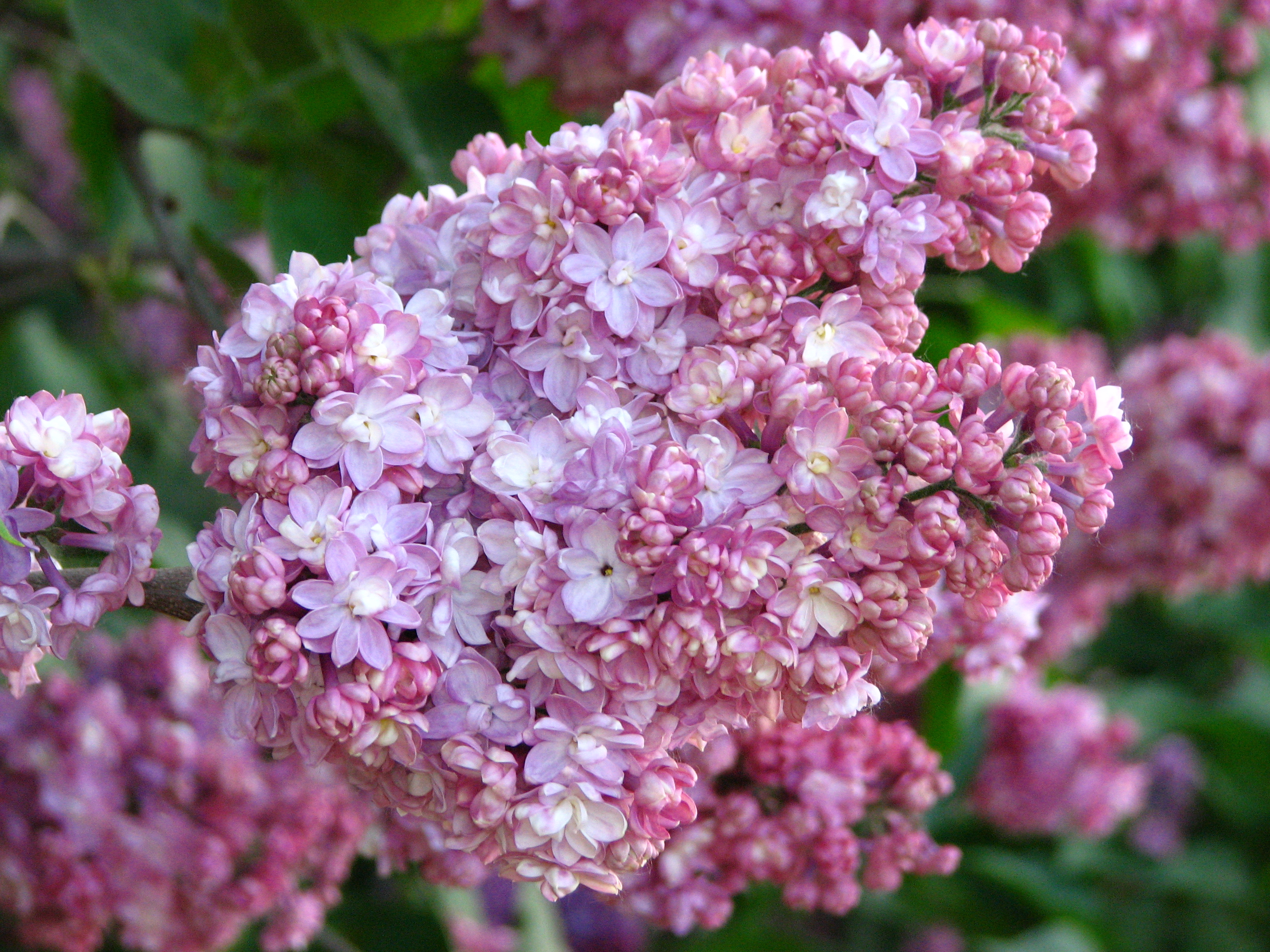
Syringa 'Pamyat o Vekhove'

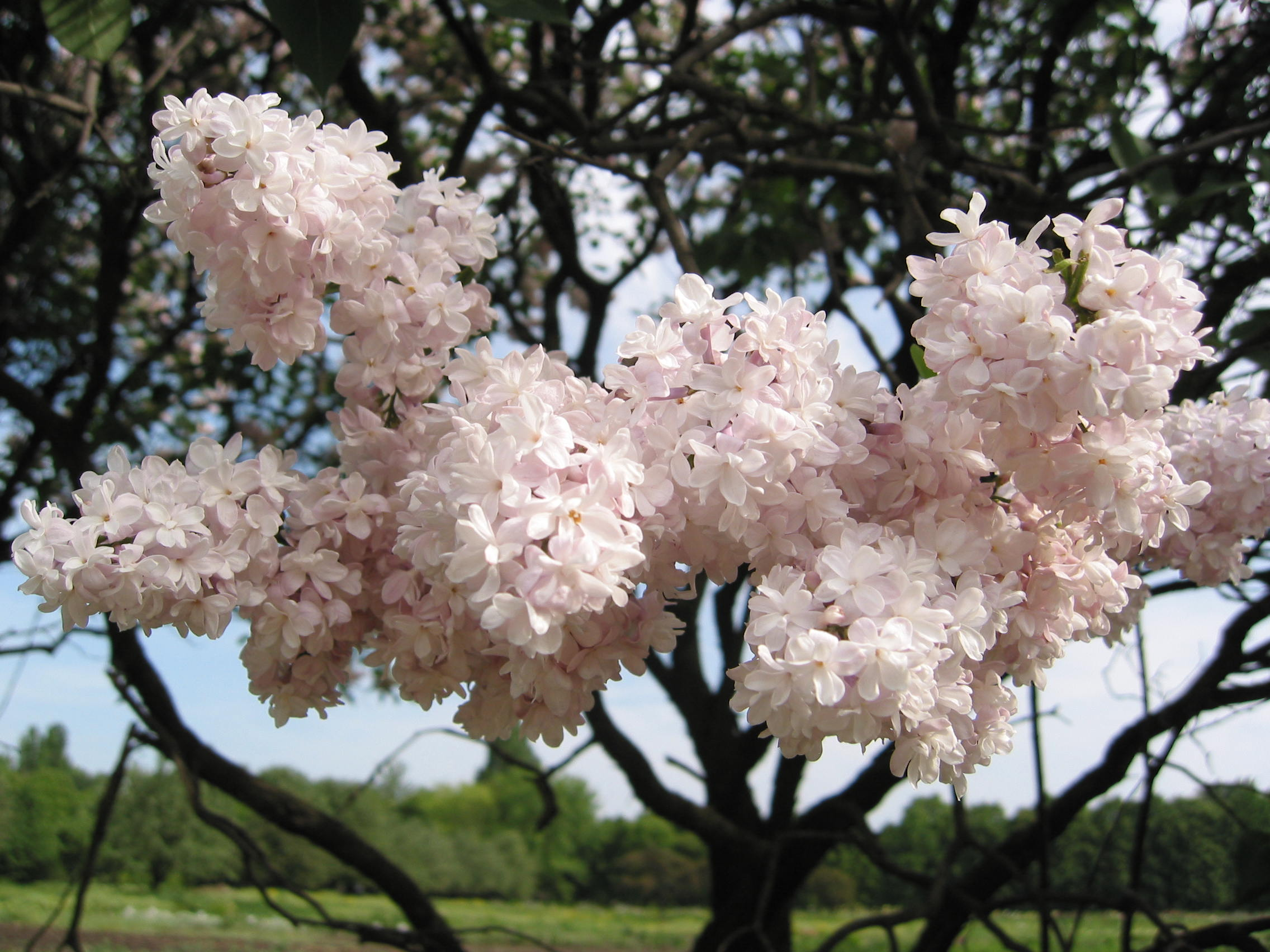
White syringa

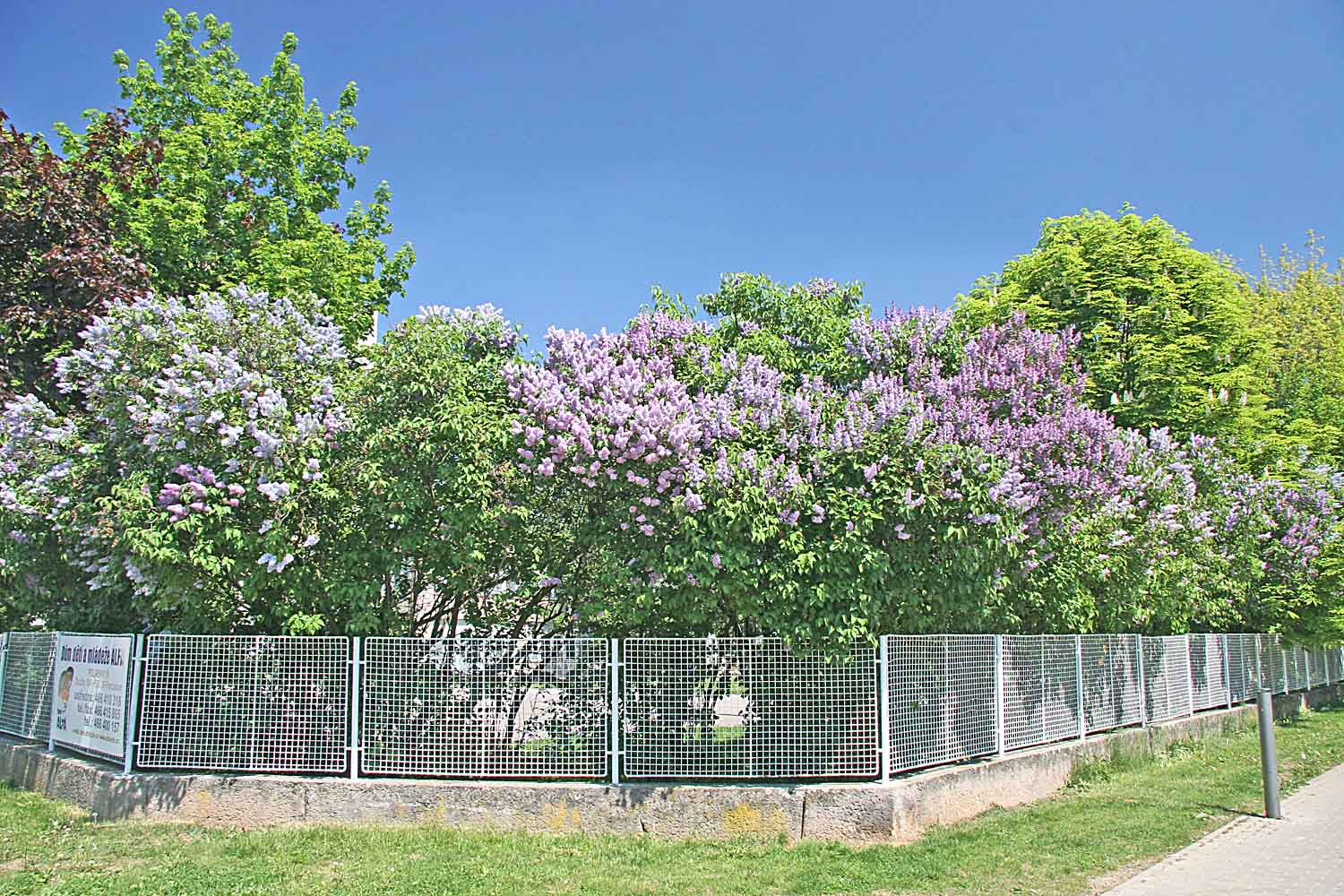
Syringarium with trees in blossom

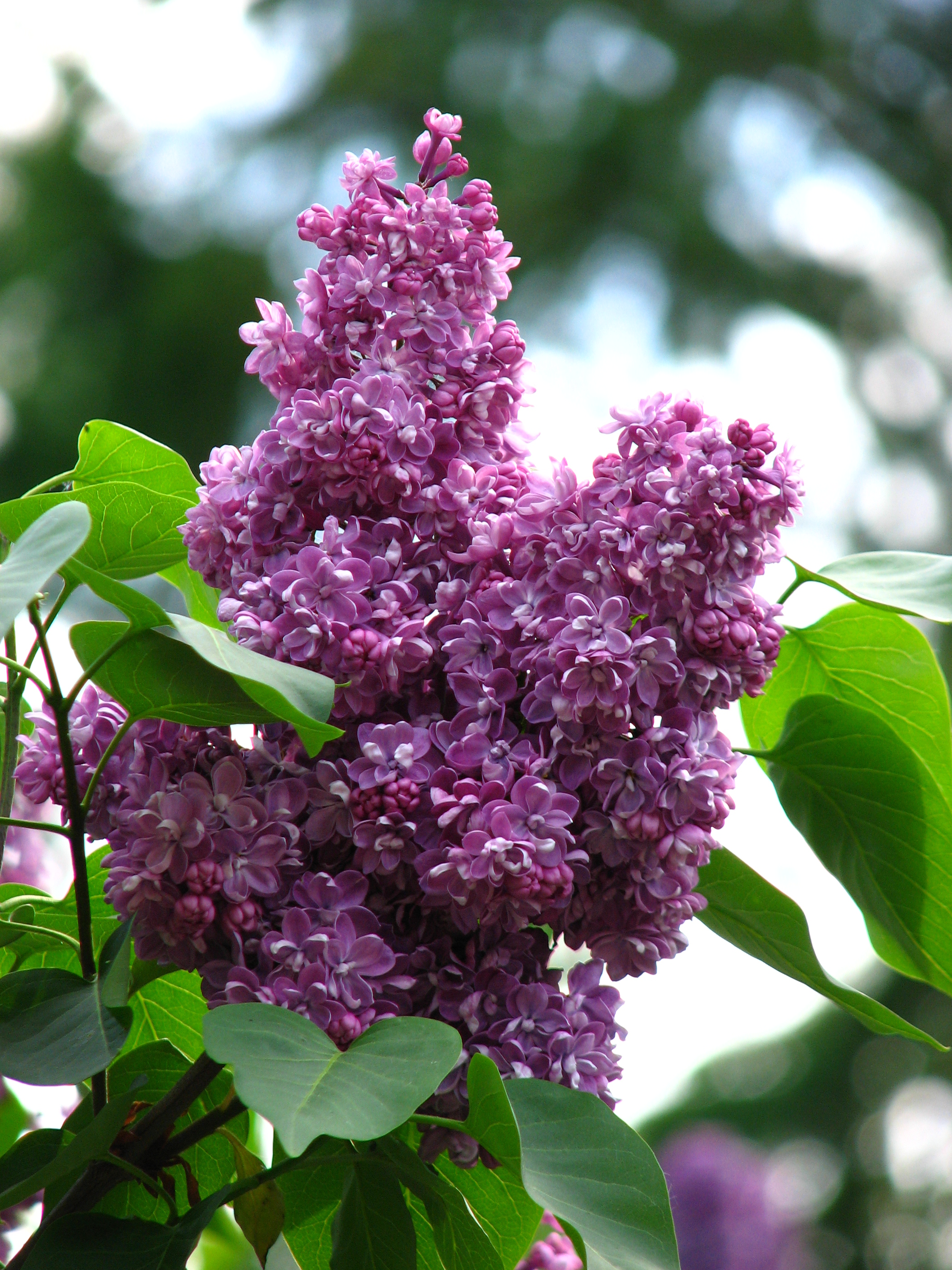
Syringa 'Pavlinka'

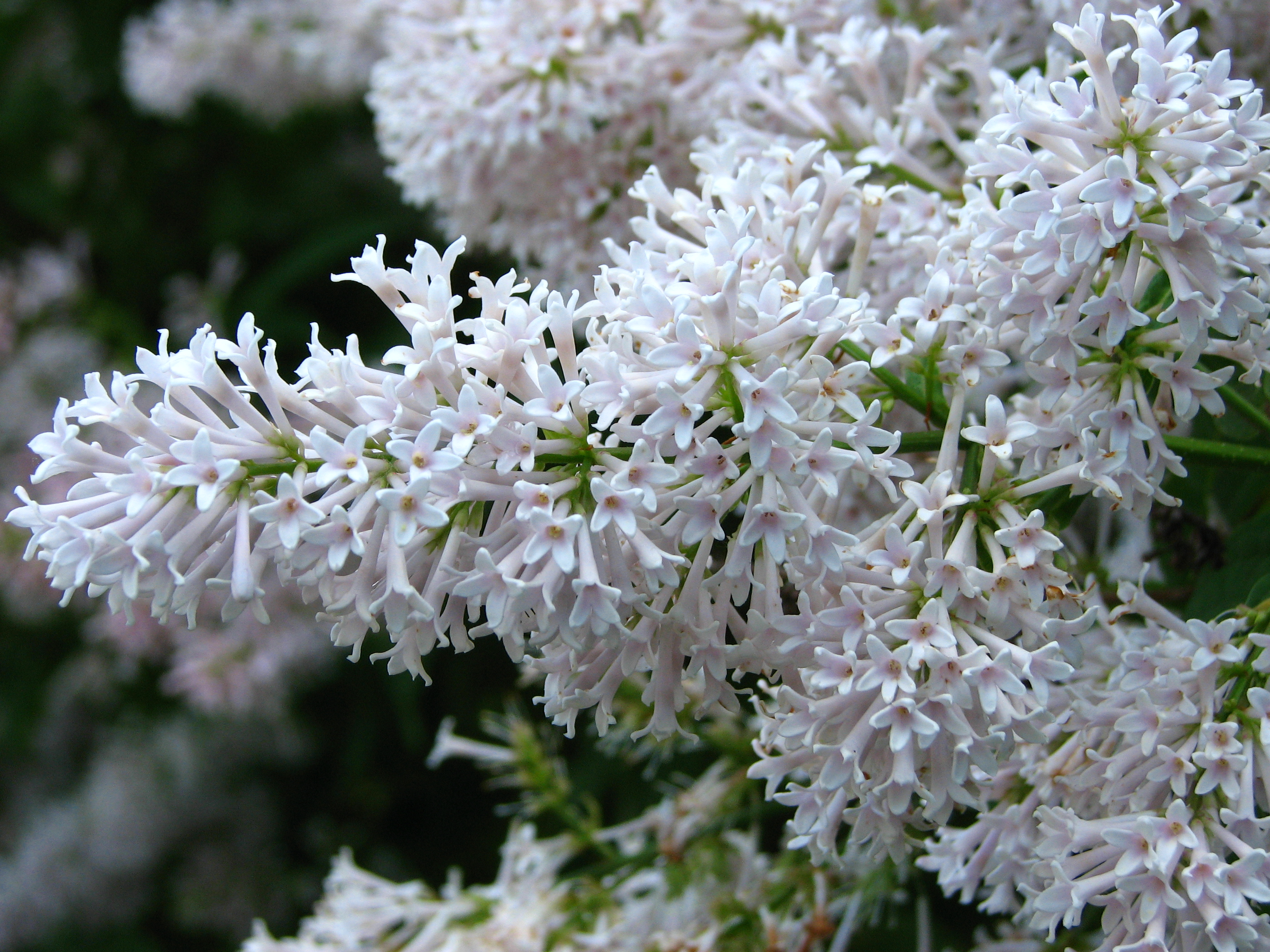
Syringa 'Oberon'
