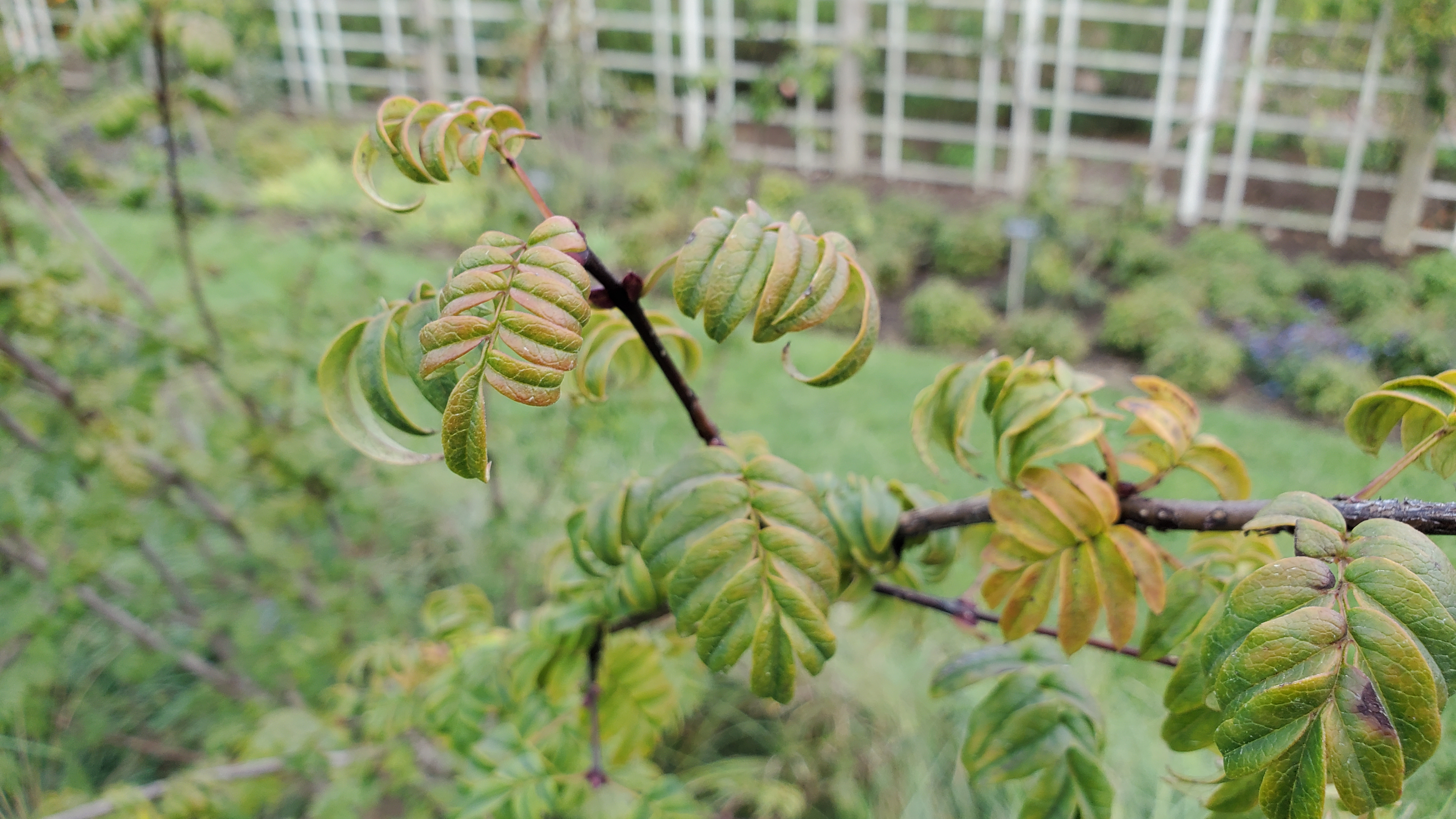

Scientific classification
- Kingdom: Plantae
- Clade: Tracheophytes
- Clade: Angiosperms
- Clade: Eudicots
- Clade: Asterids
- Order: Lamiales
- Family: Oleaceae
- Genus: Syringa
- Species: S. pinnatifolia

Binomial name
- Syringa pinnatifolia Hemsl.

Synonyms
- Syringa pinnatifolia var. alashanensis Ma & S.Q.Zhou

= Syringa pinnatifolia =

Species of plant

Syringa pinnatifolia, the pinnate lilac, is a deciduous shrub in the genus Syringa, in the family Oleaceae. It is native to Western China.

== Description ==
Syringa pinnatifolia is an open, upright, deciduous shrub with exfoliating bark, unusually pinnate, dark-green leaves with lance-shaped, dark green leaflets, and panicles of fragrant, lilac- to pink-flushed, white flowers in spring. It grows between 8ft to 12ft (2.5-4m) high. Leaves are composed of seven, nine, or eleven leaflets, which are dull green, stalkless, pointed, the base rounded or in the case of the terminal leaflets frequently attached to the common stalk by a portion of the blade.

Flowers are fragrant, pale rose-pink or white flowers in early summer, from May–June. Fruits September to October.

== Habitat ==
Syringa pinnatifolia grows mostly in a temperate biome, surviving at altitudes up to 7–9,000 ft.

== Medicinal use ==
Peeled stems of Syringa pinnatifolia have been widely used to treat coronary heart disease for hundreds of years in Inner Mongolia, China.
