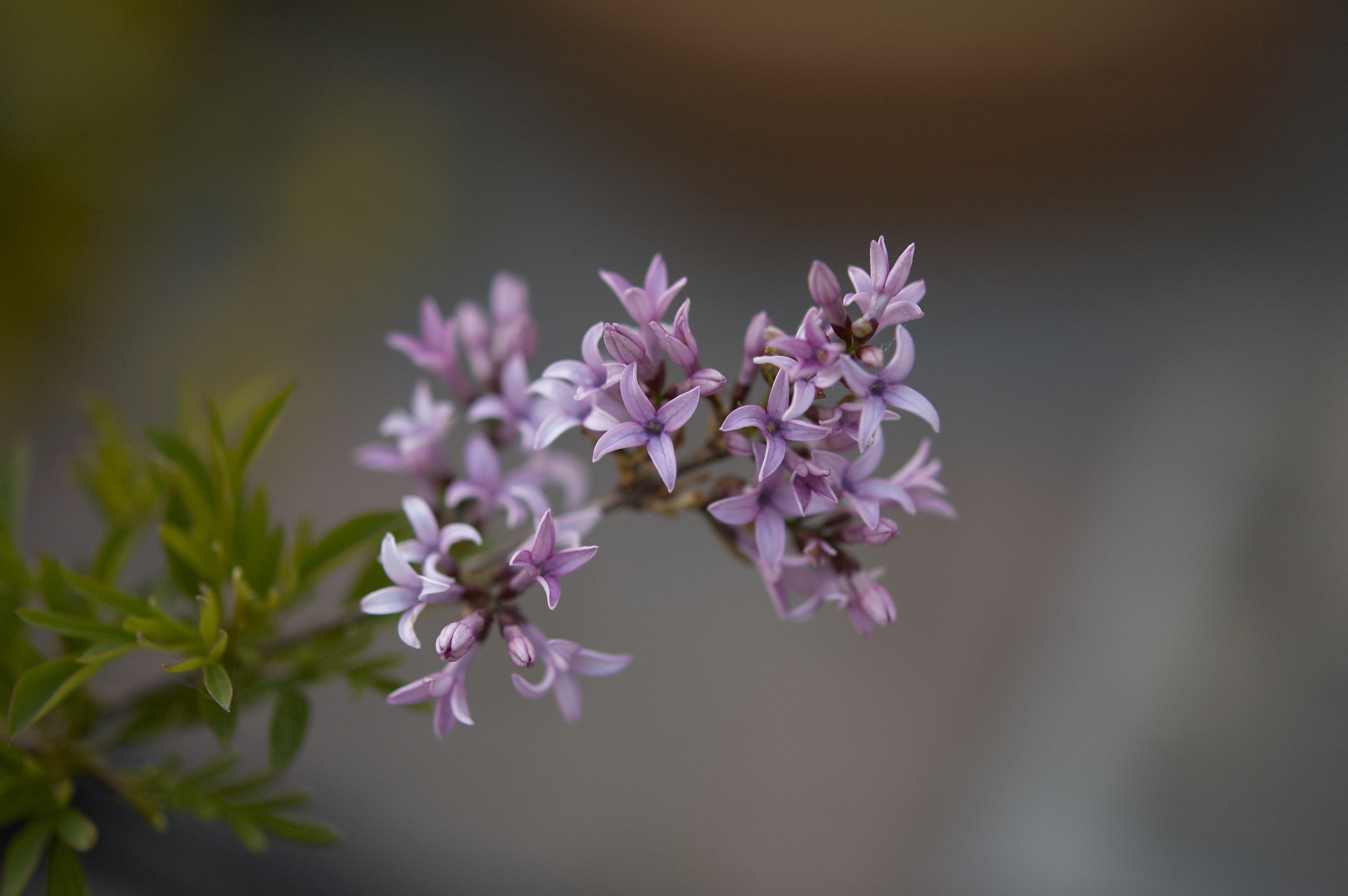

Scientific classification
- Kingdom: Plantae
- Clade: Tracheophytes
- Clade: Angiosperms
- Clade: Eudicots
- Clade: Asterids
- Order: Lamiales
- Family: Oleaceae
- Genus: Syringa
- Species: S. × laciniata

Binomial name
- Syringa × laciniata Mill.

= Syringa × laciniata =

Species of flowering plant

Syringa × laciniata, the cut-leaf lilac or cutleaf lilac, is a hybrid lilac of unknown, though old origin. It is thought to be a hybrid between Syringa vulgaris from southeastern Europe and Syringa protolaciniata from western China. Although often cited as being from China, it more likely arose somewhere in southwestern Asia, where it was first scientifically described from cultivated plants in the 17th century, possibly Iran or Afghanistan, or Pakistan, where it has been cultivated since ancient times.

It is a deciduous shrub growing to 2 m tall. The leaves are 2–4 cm long, variably entire or cut deeply into three to nine lobes or leaflets. The flowers are pale lilac, produced in loose panicles up to 7 cm long in mid spring. It is hardy to USDA plant hardiness zone 5.

== See also ==
- Syringa × persica
