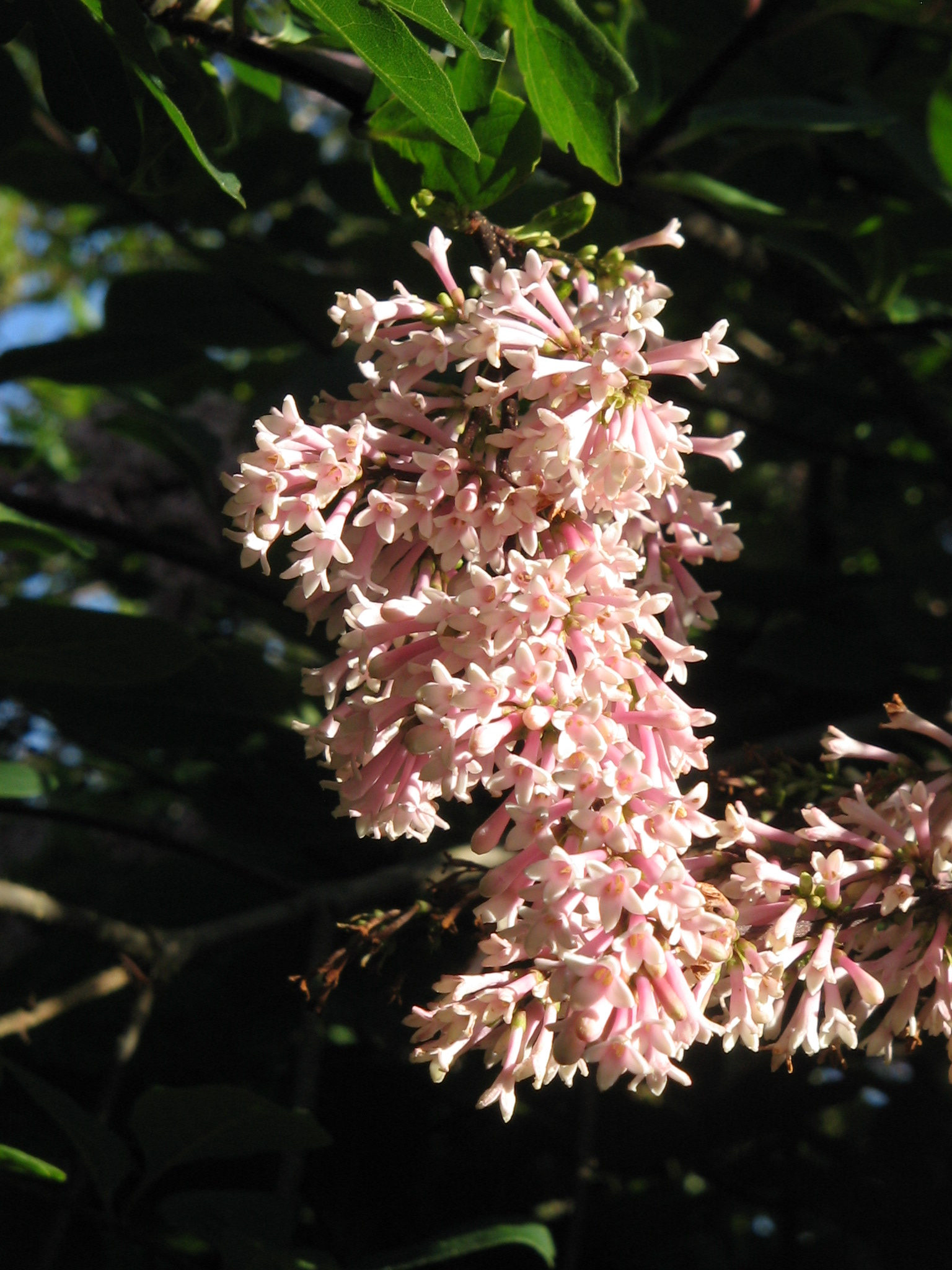

Scientific classification
- Kingdom: Plantae
- Clade: Embryophytes
- Clade: Tracheophytes
- Clade: Spermatophytes
- Clade: Angiosperms
- Clade: Eudicots
- Clade: Asterids
- Order: Lamiales
- Family: Oleaceae
- Genus: Syringa
- Species: S. tomentella

Binomial name
- Syringa tomentella Bureau & Franch.

= Syringa tomentella =

Species of flowering plant

Syringa tomentella is a species in the genus Syringa, in the family Oleaceae.

== Description ==
- Height/spread: Shrub reaching up to 1.5–7 m (4.9–23.0 ft) high and wide at maturity.
- Stems: Branchlets are densely to sparsely pubescent.
- Leaves: Petiole measures 0.8-1.5 cm. Pedicel and rachis are pubescent to villous or glabrescent. Leaf blade is elliptic-lanceolate to ovate-lanceolate, or rarely ovate to obovate. Leaf measures approximately 2.5–11 cm in length and 1.5–5 cm in width. The tops of the leaves are glabrous or densely pubescent, with the undersides of the leaves being either completely hairy or hairy along the veins only. Leaf base is sub-rounded to cuneate, while the leaf apex is acuminate to acute.
- Flowers: Panicles are lateral to terminal, erect, and loose, and measure 10–25 cm x 4–12 cm. Pedicel to 1-1.5mm in length. Calyx reaches 2.5-3mm. Corolla measures 1-1.7 cm in length and ranges in colour from white to pink or lilac-red. Flowers are sweetly scented. Tube is slightly funnelform, and measures 0.8-1.4 cm. Lobes are elliptic to ovate and spreading. Anthers are yellow and reach to the mouth or the corolla tube or protrude slightly. Flowers from June–July.
- Fruit: Capsule is oblong-elliptic and is lenticellate or smooth, measuring 1.2–2 cm in length. Fruits appear in September.

== Habitat ==
Woodland slopes, valley thickets, and along gullies, 2,500–3,600 m (8,200–11,800 ft) altitude.

== Distribution ==
Native to China, specifically western Sichuan province, south-central China, and Tibet.

== Cultivation ==
Introduced into cultivation in 1904. The Arnold Arboretum received its first specimen in 1907 from the Veitch Nursery in London.

== Etymology ==
Tomentella, meaning 'somewhat hairy', a diminutive from tomentum. Syringa is derived from the Greek word syrinx, meaning 'pipe' or 'tube'. Named for the use of its hollow stems to make flutes. In Greek mythology, the nymph Syringa was changed into a reed.
