= Syringa komarowii =

Nodding lilac

Scientific classification
- Kingdom: Plantae
- Clade: Embryophytes
- Clade: Tracheophytes
- Clade: Spermatophytes
- Clade: Angiosperms
- Clade: Eudicots
- Clade: Asterids
- Order: Lamiales
- Family: Oleaceae
- Genus: Syringa
- Species: S. komarowii

Binomial name
- Syringa komarowii C.K.Schneid.

Synonyms
- Syringa glabra (C.K.Schneid.) Lingelsh.; Syringa reflexa C.K.Schneid.; Syringa sargentiana C.K.Schneid.

Species of flowering plant

Syringa komarowii is a species of lilac native to central China, commonly called nodding lilac. It is native to the Provinces of Gansu, Hubei, Shaanxi, Sichuan, Yunnan.

It is a shrub growing to 3–6 m (9.8–19.7 ft) tall, with erect branches. The leaves are oval-oblong, 5–19 cm (2.0–7.5 in) long and 2–7 cm (0.8–2.8 in) broad. The flowers are fragrant and range in colour from pink to mauve, sometimes with a white base; they are produced in early summer, rather later than most other cultivars, on panicles 4–25 cm (1.6–9.8 in) long and are attractive to bees, butterflies, and birds. The panicles often hang limply, which is how the plant got its common name; the clusters look as though they are nodding.

There are two subspecies:

- Syringa komarowii subsp. komarowii C.K.Schneid.
- Syringa komarowii subsp. reflexa (C.K.Schneid.) P.S.Green & M.C.Chang.

== Cultivation and uses ==
Like most lilacs, it needs to be planted in full sun. It is able to survive cold winters. The flowers are good for cutting. While this plant is beautiful, it is not commonly used in landscaping. However, it is used for breeding with other species of Syringa.
