= Lilac (disambiguation) =

Lilac, Syringa, a genus of 12 currently recognized species of flowering woody plants in the olive family.

Lilac, Lilacs or The Lilacs may also refer to:

== Botanical ==
- California lilac, several species of the genus Ceanothus
- Syringa vulgaris, the common lilac
- Indian lilac or Persian lilac, Melia azedarach
- Native lilac or lilac vine, Hardenbergia violacea
- New Zealand lilac, Veronica hulkeana
- Buddleja davidii, summer lilac
- Hesperis matronalis, summer lilac

== Transport ==
- Lilac (train), a train service in Japan
- Line 5 (São Paulo Metro), a rapid transit line in Brazil
- USS Lilac (1863), a ship used by the Union Navy in the American Civil War
- USCGC Lilac (WAGL-227), a former US Coast Guard lighthouse tender built 1933
- Lilac, a line of motorcycles produced by Marusho

== Arts and entertainment ==
- Lilacs (painting), a painting by Vincent van Gogh
- Lilacs (Walker), a musical composition for soprano and orchestra by George Walker
- The Lilacs (band), a British 2020s indie pop band
- An American 1990s band co-founded by Ken Kurson
- Lilac (The Early November album), 2019
- Lilac (IU album), 2021
  - "Lilac" (IU song)
- "Lilac" (Mrs. Green Apple song), 2024
- Sash Lilac, the protagonist of the video game Freedom Planet
- Lilac (film), a 1932 French crime drama film

== Other uses ==
- Lilac (color), a light purple color typical of most lilac flowers
- Lilac (restaurant), a Michelin-starred restaurant in Tampa, Florida
- The Lilacs (Philadelphia), an 18th-century farmhouse in the United States
- Literatura Latino-Americana e do Caribe em Ciências da Saúde (LILACS), an online medicine and health sciences database
- LILAC, or Librarians' Information Literacy Conference, UK annual conference
