= Syringa chinensis =

Syringa chinensis can refer to:

- Syringa × chinensis Willd., the Chinese lilac
- Syringa chinensis Bunge, a synonym of Syringa oblata Lindl. subsp. oblata
