= Summer lilac =

Summer lilac most commonly refers to Buddleja davidii, a widely cultivated ornamental shrub also known as the butterfly bush. It may also refer to:

- Other Buddleja species and cultivars
- Hesperis matronalis, a herbaceous plant also known as dame's rocket and sweet rocket
- A Hemerocallis interspecies hybrid, the summer lilac daylily

== See also ==
- Lilac (disambiguation)
