= Puzieux =

Puzieux may refer to the following places in France:

- Puzieux, Moselle, a commune in the Moselle department
- Puzieux, Vosges, a commune in the Vosges department
