= Delme, Moselle =

Delme
- Commune
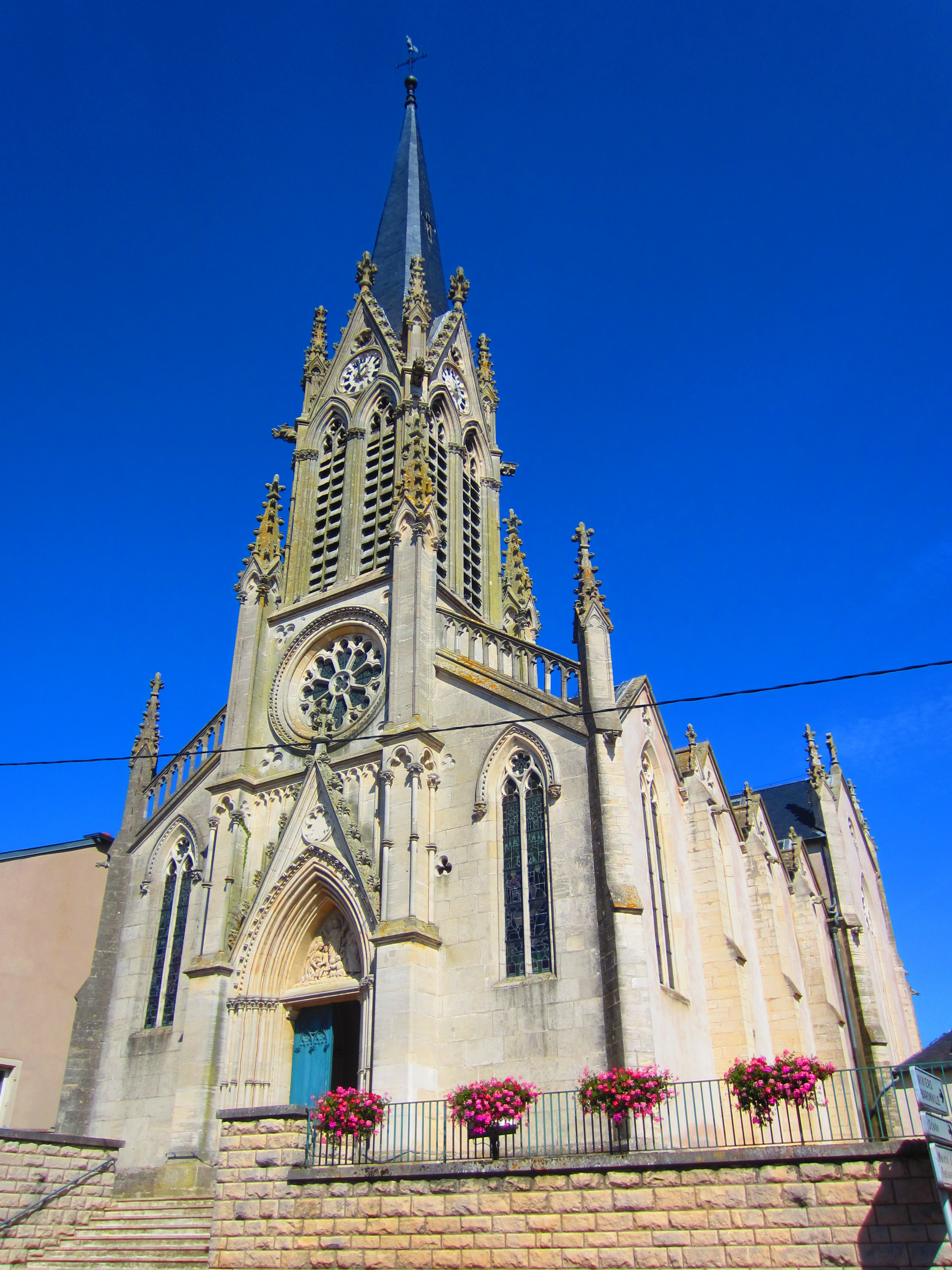
- The church in Delme

- Coat of arms
- Location of Delme
- Location within France Location within Grand Est
- Coordinates: 48°53′16″N 6°23′35″E
- Country: France
- Region: Grand Est
- Department: Moselle
- Arrondissement: Sarrebourg-Château-Salins
- Canton: Le Saulnois
- Intercommunality: CC du Saulnois

Government
  - Mayor (2020–2026): Loïc Klopp
- Area^{1}: 5.09 km^{2} (1.97 sq mi)
- Highest elevation: 280 m (920 ft)
- Lowest elevation: 208 m (682 ft)
- Population (2023): 1,166
  - Density: 229/km^{2} (593/sq mi)
- Time zone: UTC+01:00 (CET)
  - Summer (DST): UTC+02:00 (CEST)
- INSEE/Postal code: 57171 /57590
- ^{1} French Land Register data, which excludes lakes, ponds, glaciers > 1 km^{2} (0.386 sq mi or 247 acres) and river estuaries.

Delme (French pronunciation: [dɛlm]; German: Delm) is a commune in the Moselle department in Grand Est in north-eastern France. It was the center of the former canton of Delme until 2015. As of 2023, the population of the commune was 1,166.

== Geography ==
Delme is located 30 km to the southeast of Metz and 27 km northeast of Nancy. Next communes: Tincry and Prévocourt in the northeast, Viviers in the east, Donjeux, Laneuveville-en-Saulnois and Oriocourt in the southeast, Lemoncourt in the south, Puzieux, Alaincourt-la-Côte and Xocourt in the northwest. Its area is 5.09 km^{2} and its elevation ranges between 208 and 280 m.

== History ==
In 1790, Delme joined the Meurthe department.

During his reign, Napoleon I would have made several stops in Delme.

The commune was integrated into Alsace–Lorraine following the French defeat in the Franco-Prussian War of 1870, then returned to France following the First World War in 1918.

On the afternoon of September 3, 1944, the railway yard was bombed by American shells. The commune, wounded by the fighting, will not be liberated until November 17, 1944.

== Education ==
- College Andre Malraux

== Famous natives ==
- Victor Lemoine (1823—1911). Famous French selector of ornamental plants who in particular created many grades of a lilac.

== See also ==
- Communes of the Moselle department
