= Puzieux, Vosges =

Puzieux
- Commune
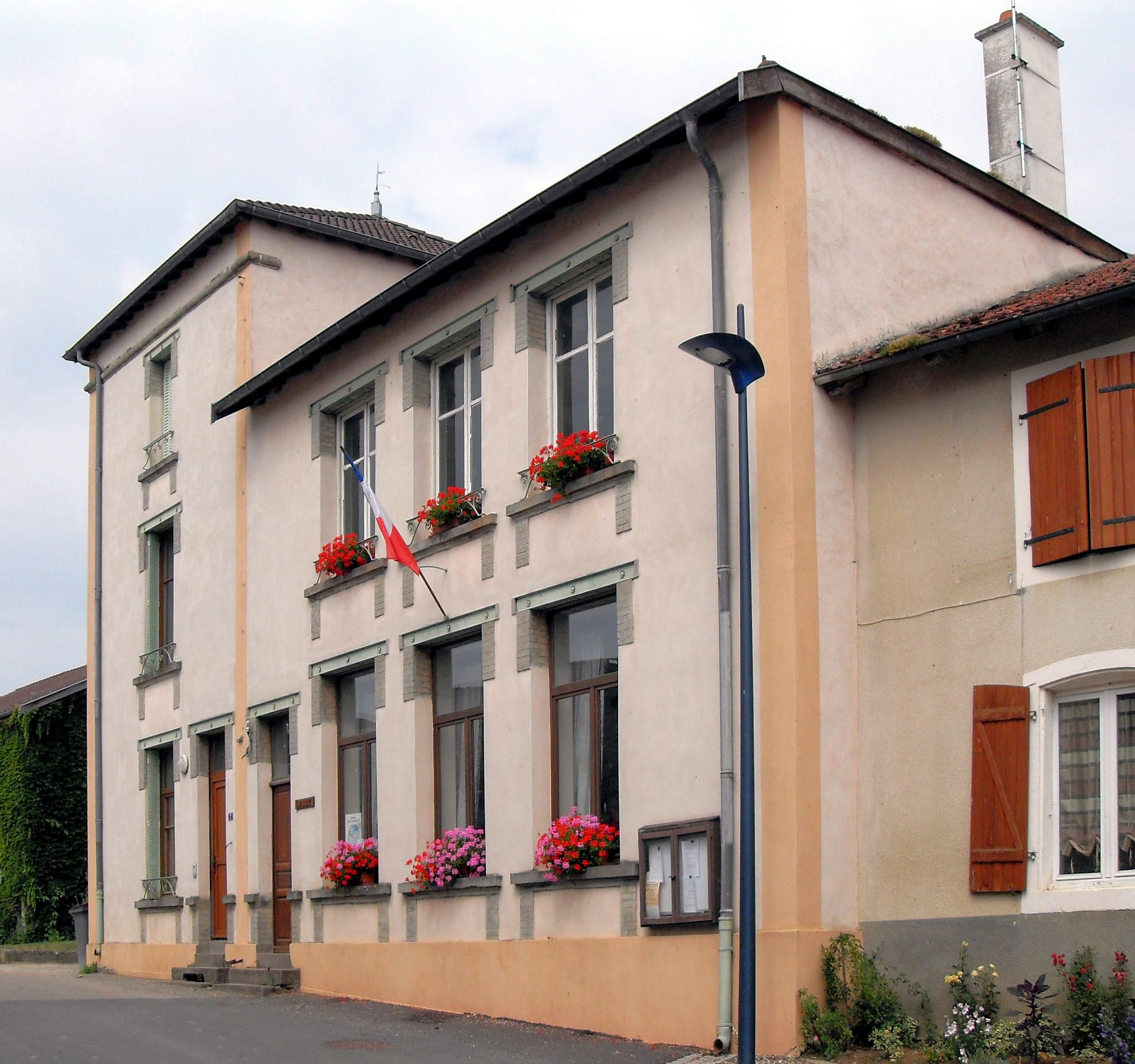
- The town hall in Puzieux

- Coat of arms
- Location of Puzieux
- Location within France Location within Grand Est
- Coordinates: 48°20′01″N 6°05′54″E
- Country: France
- Region: Grand Est
- Department: Vosges
- Arrondissement: Neufchâteau
- Canton: Mirecourt
- Intercommunality: CC Mirecourt Dompaire

Government
  - Mayor (2020–2026): Philippe Nicolas
- Area^{1}: 5.42 km^{2} (2.09 sq mi)
- Elevation: 270 m (890 ft)
- Highest elevation: 345 m (1,132 ft)
- Lowest elevation: 268 m (879 ft)
- Population (2023): 146
  - Density: 26.9/km^{2} (69.8/sq mi)
- Time zone: UTC+01:00 (CET)
  - Summer (DST): UTC+02:00 (CEST)
- INSEE/Postal code: 88364 /88500
- ^{1} French Land Register data, which excludes lakes, ponds, glaciers > 1 km^{2} (0.386 sq mi or 247 acres) and river estuaries.

Puzieux (French pronunciation: [pyzjø]) is a commune in the Vosges department in Grand Est in northeastern France.

Inhabitants acre called Putéoliens.

Puzieux in the Vosges département should not be confused with the Pusieux in the Moselle département to the north.

== Geography ==
Puzieux is sited on the north-east of the Vosges Plain, close to the neighbouring Meurthe-et-Moselle département. The village is within the Canton of Mirecourt, itself some 4 kilometres (2 mi) to the south-east. Beyond the south side of Puzieux is the approach path for the local airport.

The communal territory is traversed by two streams called Les Pierres and Oëlleville. The streams are set in grassland, while the slightly drier land in the commune is used for arable farming. Around the village there are some orchards along with the surviving traces of old vineyards. Save at the outer limits ff the commune, little remains of the forest which probably covered most of the land here in ancient times.

== History ==
The name Puzieux has mutated from the Gallo-Roman period name which was Puzeoli. Various ideas have been advanced concerning the ancient origin of this name, but the most plausible is that it refers to a pit dug in the ground for the storage of grain. It is known from other sources that Pusieux was at the heart of the Xantois region which produced large amounts of farmed wheat at that time: the presence of grain storage facilities at the heart of such a region would therefore not be surprising.

During the Thirty Years' War the village was destroyed by invading Swedish forces. The first half of the seventeenth century was a miserable period. During the reign, in France, of Louis XIII Puzieux was subjected to the ravages of the French invaders supported by their savage northern allies. At one point it was reported that only three houses of the village remained.

It was only with the return of some measure of peace in 1670 and, more particularly, after 1697 when the Treaty of Ryswick confirmed the restoration of Lorraine to the Dukes of Lorraine, that the village could be reconstructed. Modern research suggests that the village rebuilt during the early decades of the eighteenth century was actually the result of the fusion of three villages that had been destroyed by the Swedes, being those previously known as Puzieux, Méréville and Fontenelle.

== See also ==
- Communes of the Vosges department
