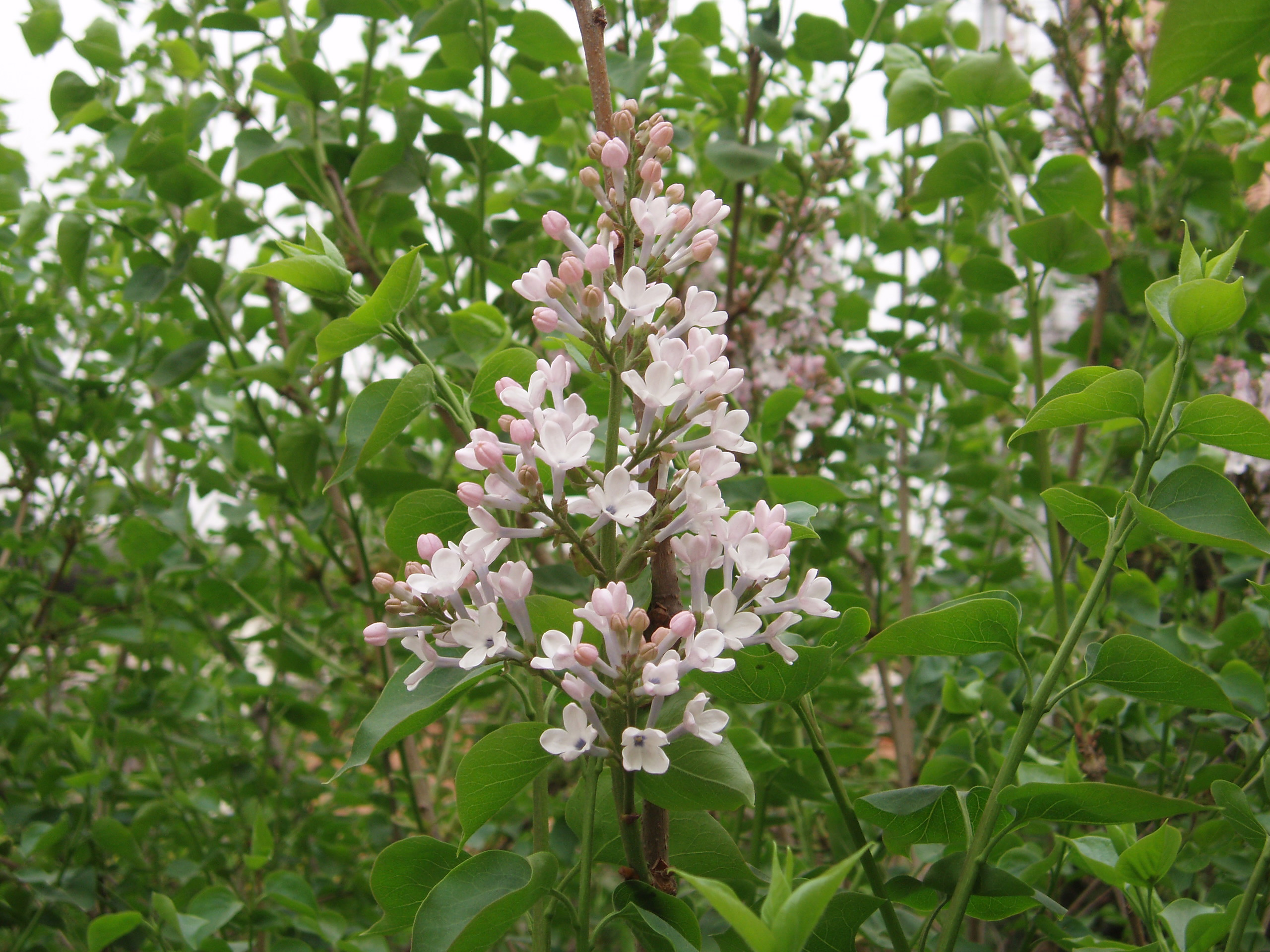

Conservation status
- Least Concern (IUCN 3.1)

Scientific classification
- Kingdom: Plantae
- Clade: Embryophytes
- Clade: Tracheophytes
- Clade: Spermatophytes
- Clade: Angiosperms
- Clade: Eudicots
- Clade: Asterids
- Order: Lamiales
- Family: Oleaceae
- Genus: Syringa
- Species: S. oblata

Binomial name
- Syringa oblata Lindl.

= Syringa oblata =

Species of flowering plant

Syringa oblata is a species in the genus Syringa, in the family Oleaceae. It is also known as early blooming lilac or broadleaf lilac.

== Description ==
Similar to Syringa vulgaris, but flowers earlier and has very different leaves. Most commonly seen lilac species in China.

- Height: Shrub or small tree to 3.5 m (11 ft) or 5 m (16 ft).
- Stems: May be glabrous, pubescent, or puberulent (with fine, minute hairs). Shoots are glabrous.
- Leaves: Ovate-orbicular to reniform, often slightly wider than long, measuring 2.5-10 (occasionally up to 14) cm x 2.5-8 (occasionally 15) cm. Leaves range from glabrous to pubescent, villous, or glabrescent (losing hairs with age). Base is truncate to subcordate or broadly cuneate, with an abruptly acute to long acuminate apex. Leaves colour well in fall, often turning to shades of red in autumn.
- Flowers: Panicles are lateral, congested, lax, or erect, and measure 4 - 16 (occasionally as much as 20) cm x 3 - 8 (occasionally 10) cm. Pedicel to 3 mm in length, and may be either pubescent or glabrous. Corolla is about 1.3 cm long and 1.7 cm across, and ranges from purple to lilac, and occasionally white; tube is subcylindric, and measures 0.6 - 1.7 (occasionally up to 2.2) cm in length. Calyx is slightly glandular. Lobes are oblong to obovate-orbicular or ovate-orbicular and measure 4 - 8 (occasionally 10) mm, spreading. Anthers are yellow, inserted in corolla tube to 4 mm from the mouth. Flowers are fragrant and appear earlier than any other species of Syringa, from April to May and June.
- Fruit: Smooth obovate-elliptic to ovate or oblong-lanceolate capsule measures 0.7 - 1.5 (rarely 2) cm.

== Habitat ==
Gravelly mountains, roadsides, stream banks, thickets, valleys, and woods. 100–2,600 m (330–8,530 ft) altitude.

== Distribution ==
China: Gansu, Hebei, Henan, Heilongjiang, Jilin, Liaoning, Nei Mongol, Ningxia, Qinghai, Shaanxi, Shandong, Shanxi, and northwest Sichuan provinces.

Korea: Throughout.

== Cultivation ==
Widely cultivated in most areas of China.

Many hybrids are cultivated throughout Europe and the Americas, including numerous cultivars of S. x hyacinthiflora, Victor Lemoine's hybrid with S. vulgaris.

== Subspecies ==
- Syringa oblata subsp. dilatata

== Etymology ==
Oblata from the modern Latin oblatus, meaning 'somewhat flattened at the ends, oval, oblate'. Syringa is derived from the Greek word syrinx, meaning 'pipe' or 'tube'. Named for the use of its hollow stems to make flutes. In Greek mythology, the nymph Syringa was changed into a reed.
