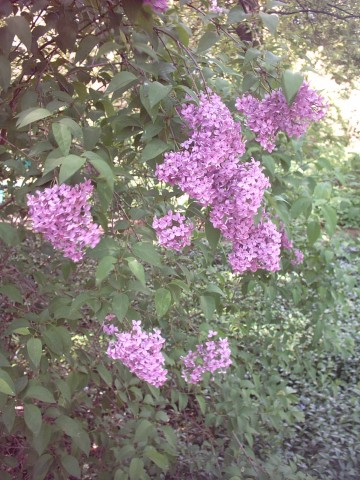

Scientific classification
- Kingdom: Plantae
- Clade: Tracheophytes
- Clade: Angiosperms
- Clade: Eudicots
- Clade: Asterids
- Order: Lamiales
- Family: Oleaceae
- Genus: Syringa
- Species: S. × persica

Binomial name
- Syringa × persica L.

Synonyms
- Syringa persica L.

= Syringa × persica =

Persian lilac

Species of flowering plant

Syringa × persica, the Persian lilac, is a hybrid, thought to originate from a cross of Syringa × laciniata and S. afghanica. More compact than common lilacs, it grows up to 4–8 feet (1.2–2.4 m) and spreads about 5–10 ft (1.5–3.0 m). Persian lilac prefers warmer winter climates (hardiness zones 5–9) than many species of lilac. Its hybrid with Syringa vulgaris, the common lilac, is Syringa × chinensis, sometimes called Rouen lilac.

This is a different plant than Melia azedarach, also sometimes called Persian lilac.
