= Hesperis kotschyi =

Scientific classification
- Kingdom: Plantae
- Clade: Tracheophytes
- Clade: Angiosperms
- Clade: Eudicots
- Clade: Rosids
- Order: Brassicales
- Family: Brassicaceae
- Genus: Hesperis
- Species: H. kotschyi

Binomial name
- Hesperis kotschyi Boiss.

Synonyms
- Hesperis humilis Boiss.

Species of flowering plant

Hesperis kotschyi, commonly called Kotschy's damask flower, is a flowering plant in the family Brassicaceae. It is named after the 19th century Austrian botanist Theodor Kotschy. The species is endemic to southern Turkey in the Irano-Turanian floristic region. Hesperis kotschyi is a perennial herb which has lilac colored flowers. Its habitat is among rubble on plateaus at elevations of 1,800–2,300 m (5,900–7,500 ft).
