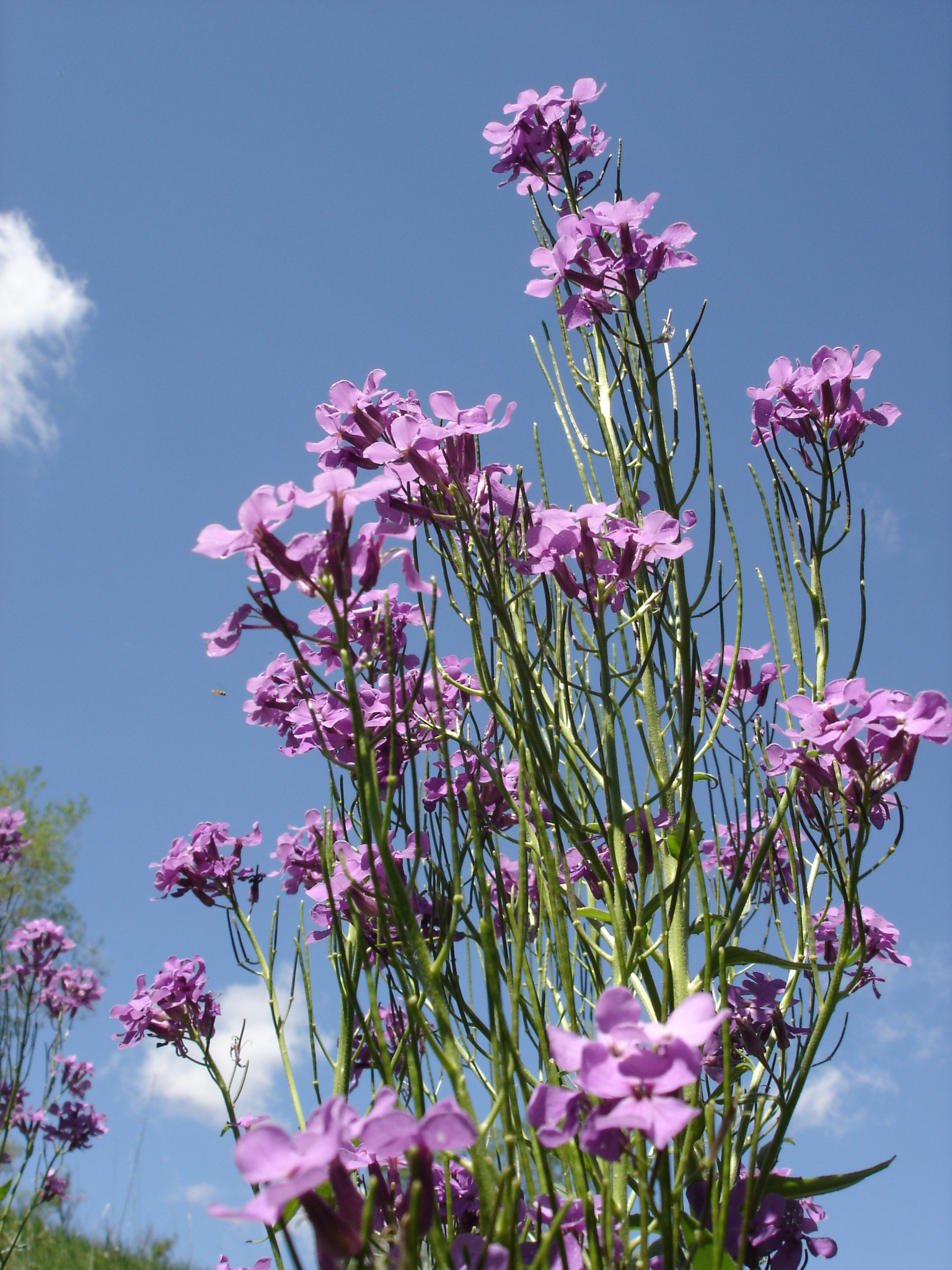
- Hesperis matronalis

Scientific classification
- Kingdom: Plantae
- Clade: Tracheophytes
- Clade: Angiosperms
- Clade: Eudicots
- Clade: Rosids
- Order: Brassicales
- Family: Brassicaceae
- Genus: Hesperis; L.

= Hesperis =

Genus of flowering plants

Hesperis is a genus of flowering plants in the family Brassicaceae. Most are native to Eurasia, with several endemic to Greece and Turkey. Many plants of this genus bear showy, fragrant flowers in shades of purple and white. One of the more widely known species is the common garden flower Hesperis matronalis. The genus name Hesperis was probably given because the scent of the flowers becomes more conspicuous towards evening (Hespera is the Greek word for evening).

== Species ==
The following species are recognised in the genus Hesperis:

- Hesperis anatolica A.Duran
- Hesperis armena Boiss.
- Hesperis bakhtiarica Eslami-Farouji, Assadi & Khodayari
- Hesperis balansae E.Fourn.
- Hesperis bicuspidata (Willd.) Poir.
- Hesperis blakelockii F.Dvořák
- Hesperis boissieriana Bornm.
- Hesperis borbasii F.Dvořák
- Hesperis bottae E.Fourn.
- Hesperis breviscapa Boiss.
- Hesperis burdurensis Ö.Çetin
- Hesperis buschiana Tzvelev
- Hesperis cilicica (Siehe ex Bornm.) A.Duran
- Hesperis ciscaucasica F.Dvořák & V.I.Dorof.
- Hesperis dinarica Beck
- Hesperis dvorakii D.A.German
- Hesperis hamzaoglui A.Duran
- Hesperis hedgei P.H.Davis & Kit Tan
- Hesperis hirsutissima (N.Busch) Tzvelev
- Hesperis hyrcana Bornm. & Gauba
- Hesperis ilamica Eslami-Farouji, Khodayari & Assadi
- Hesperis inodora L.
- Hesperis isatidea (Boiss.) D.A.German & Al-Shehbaz
- Hesperis kitiana P.H.Davis
- Hesperis kotschyi Boiss.
- Hesperis kuerschneri Parolly & Kit Tan
- Hesperis kurdica F.Dvořák & Hadač
- Hesperis laciniata All.
- Hesperis luristanica F.Dvořák
- Hesperis matronalis L.
- Hesperis microcalyx E.Fourn.
- Hesperis muglensis Hamzaoğlu & Koç
- Hesperis multicaulis Boiss.
- Hesperis nivalis Boiss. & Hausskn.
- Hesperis novakii F.Dvořák
- Hesperis odorata F.Dvořák
- Hesperis ozcelikii A.Duran
- Hesperis pendula DC.
- Hesperis persica Boiss.
- Hesperis pisidica Hub.-Mor.
- Hesperis podocarpa Boiss.
- Hesperis sibirica L.
- Hesperis slovaca (F.Dvořák) F.Dvořák
- Hesperis steveniana DC.
- Hesperis straussii Bornm.
- Hesperis sylvestris Crantz
- Hesperis syriaca (DC.) F.Dvořák
- Hesperis theophrasti Borbás
- Hesperis thyrsoidea Boiss.
- Hesperis tosyaensis A.Duran
- Hesperis tristis L.
- Hesperis turkmendaghensis A.Duran & Ocak
- Hesperis zaferi Hamzaoğlu & Koç

== Classical literature source ==
Classical literature source for the plant Hesperis:

- Pliny, Natural History 21. 18 ff (trans. Bostock & Riley) (Roman historian C1st AD)
