= Victor Lemoine =

French botanist and horticulturist (1823–1911)

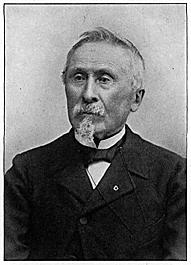
Victor Lemoine.

Pierre Louis Victor Lemoine (October 21, 1823 in Delme, Moselle - December 11, 1911) was a celebrated and prolific French flower breeder who, among other accomplishments, created many of today's lilac varieties. As a result of his accomplishments, the term French lilac has come to mean all cultivars of the common lilac that have double flowers, regardless of their origin.

== Early years ==
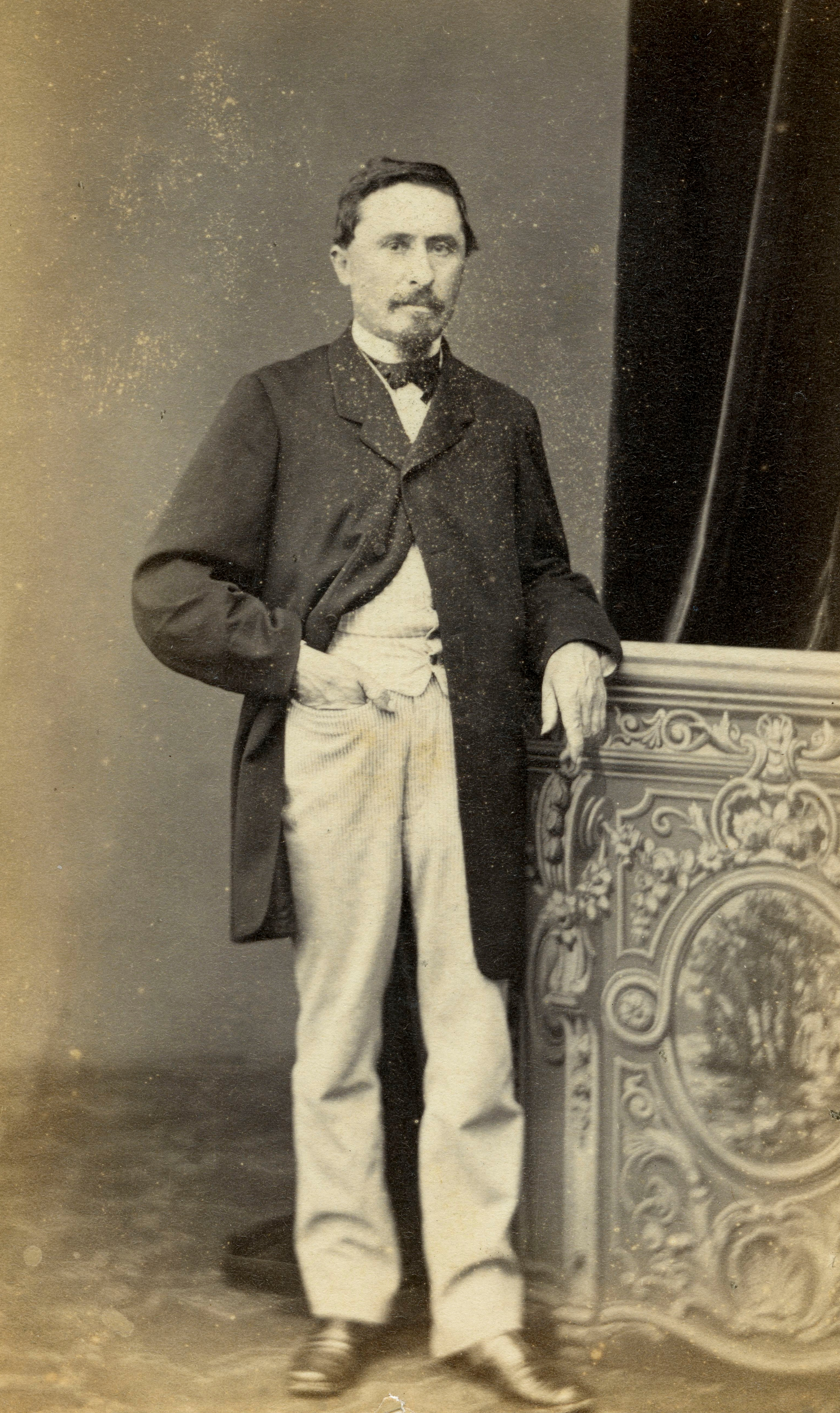
In 1869

Lemoine was born to a family of skilled gardeners in Delme, Lorraine, France on October 21, 1823. His father and grandfather managed large garden estates at the time of his birth. The family was affluent enough for Lemoine to attend an exclusive boys school nearby. With his family's connections, he was able to apprentice with three leading horticulturalists in France. Lemoine devoted several years to furthering his knowledge working with these men.

In 1840, at the age of 17, Lemoine went to work for botanist and nurseryman, E.A. Baumann, in the village of Bollwiller. Little is known about Lemoine's time with Baumann, but he later dedicated many of his hybrids to his former mentor. He next moved to Ghent, Belgium, where he spent time furthering his horticultural studies with Louis van Houtte. In later years, he would say that this period was the most influential of all his learning experiences. Van Houtte was an excellent horticulturalist, teacher and artist. Lemoine's last apprenticeship was with botanist, Auguste Miellez, at his nursery, in the village of Esquermes.

== Career ==
In 1849, Lemoine established his independence by buying property 40 miles away from his family and an opening his own nursery at Nancy, France. By 1850 Lemoine had established himself as a florist and gardener; the Revue Horticole mentioned Lemoine's double flowered Portulaca. In 1854 Lemoine produced the first double Potentilla (Gloire de Nancy), and the first Streptocarpus hybrids. It was about the same period that Lemoine turned his hand to fuchsias and introduced many varieties, including the double flowered hybrid Solferino. By 1862 he had introduced a white Spiraea callosa, in 1866 the first genuine double-flowered zonal Pelargonium geraniums (Gloire de Nancy), and in 1868 the first of his hybrid weigelas.

The greatest of his creations, though, were undoubtedly his lilacs. Starting in 1870 Lemoine and his descendants (Émile Lemoine (1862-1942) and Henri Lemoine (1897-1982)) introduced over 200 new lilac cultivars. In 1876 he created the double French hybrids and hybridized the first hyacinthiflora lilacs, the result of crosses between the early-blooming Syringa oblata and the familiar S. vulgaris. However, his work was by no means confined to lilacs. During the last fifteen years of his life he produced excellent new varieties of Astilbe, cannas, Delphinium, Deutzia, Gladiolus, Heuchera, Hydrangea, Penstemon, peonies, Philadelphus, and Weigela, as well as more modest efforts in chrysanthemums, dahlias, bush honeysuckles, Montbretia, Phlox, saxifrages, and Spiraea.

== Death ==
Lemoine died at Nancy on 11 December 1911 aged 88.

== Honors and awards ==
“Measured not alone by the number of novelties, but also by their intrinsic value to the gardens of the world, Victor Lemoine, the great French nurseryman, deserves credit as the greatest plant breeder, “creator” if you will, that the world has ever seen.”

– From The Garden Magazine (US), May 1917.

Lemoine was awarded the Veitch Memorial Medal of Horticulture by the Royal Horticultural Society, the first foreigner so honoured.

He also received the George R. White Medal of Honor from the Massachusetts Horticultural Society.

== Personal life ==
Lemoine married a young woman from Delme, Marie Louise Gomieu (1834–1905). They had two daughters and a son, Emile (1862-1942), whose son, Henri became an important horticulturist in his own right. Lemoine taught Marie the techniques he used to crossbreed plants and she became an important contributor to the family's success. One of their daughters married legendary French psychologist, Émile Coué. Lemoine was active in the family business until the 1890's when his son, Emile, took over the company's management. The nursery continued to be owned by the family until Henri closed its doors in 1968.
