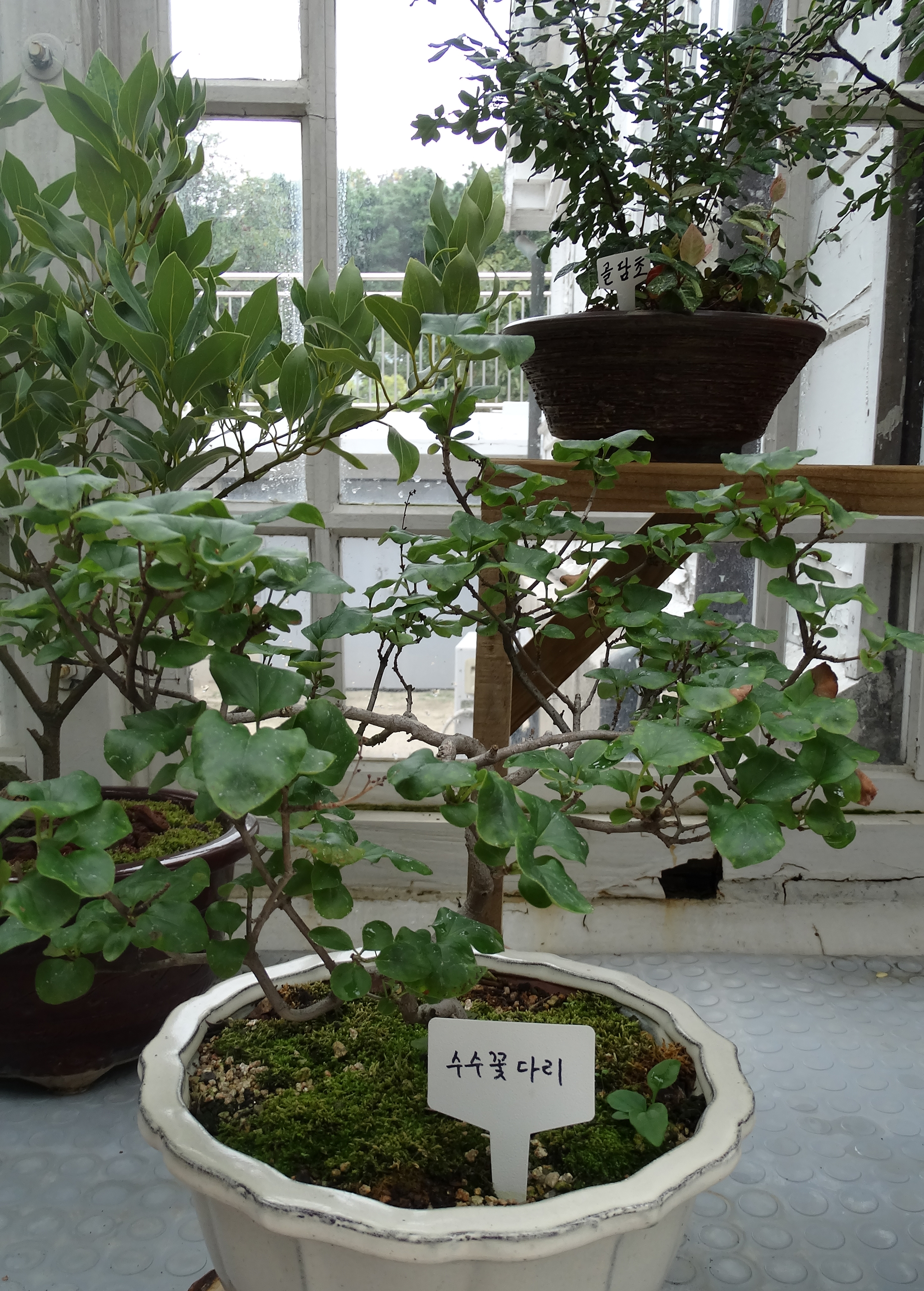

Scientific classification
- Kingdom: Plantae
- Clade: Embryophytes
- Clade: Tracheophytes
- Clade: Spermatophytes
- Clade: Angiosperms
- Clade: Eudicots
- Clade: Asterids
- Order: Lamiales
- Family: Oleaceae
- Genus: Syringa
- Species: S. oblata
- Subspecies: S. o. subsp. dilatata

Trinomial name
- Syringa oblata subsp. dilatata (Nakai) P.S.Green & M.C.Chang

= Syringa oblata subsp. dilatata =

Subspecies of flowering plant

Syringa oblata subsp. dilatata, also known as Korean early lilac, is a subspecies of the species Syringa oblata in the genus Syringa, in the family Oleaceae.

== Description ==
- Height/Spread: Shrub or small tree 1-3m or 5m high and wide.
- Leaves: Ovate to ovate-orbicular, broadly heart-shaped, tapered leaves, measuring 3–10 cm or to 8 cm in length, and 2.5–8 cm wide. Base is truncate to broadly cuneate, or rarely subcordate, with a short to long acuminate apex. Leaves are bronze when young, becoming glossy mid-green, and finally purple or 'wine-coloured' in autumn.
- Flowers: Panicles are lateral, lax, and measure 5-10 or 12 cm x 8 cm. Corolla ranges in colour from lilac to red-lilac or violet-lilac, sometimes white; tube measures 1-1.7 cm (rarely to 2.2 cm) in length. Lobes are oblong-elliptic and measure 5-8 (occasionally 10) mm. Anthers are inserted in the middle of the corolla tube. Fragrant flowers are borne in mid-spring, May–June.
- Fruit: Capsule measures 7-12 (rarely 15) mm. Fruits in September.

== Habitat ==
Gravelly mountains, 100–700 m (330–2,300 ft) altitude.

== Distribution ==
China: Jilin and Liaoning provinces.

Korea: Throughout.

== Cultivation ==
Widely cultivated. Notable cultivars include:

- 'Birchwood'
- 'Cheyenne'
- 'Donaldii'
- 'Nakai'
- 'Wild Fire'

== Etymology ==
Oblata from the modern Latin oblatus, meaning 'somewhat flattened at the ends, oval, oblate'. Dilatata means 'widened', 'spread out', or 'dilated'. Syringa is derived from the Greek word syrinx, meaning 'pipe' or 'tube'. Named for the use of its hollow stems to make flutes. In Greek mythology, the nymph Syringa was changed into a reed.
