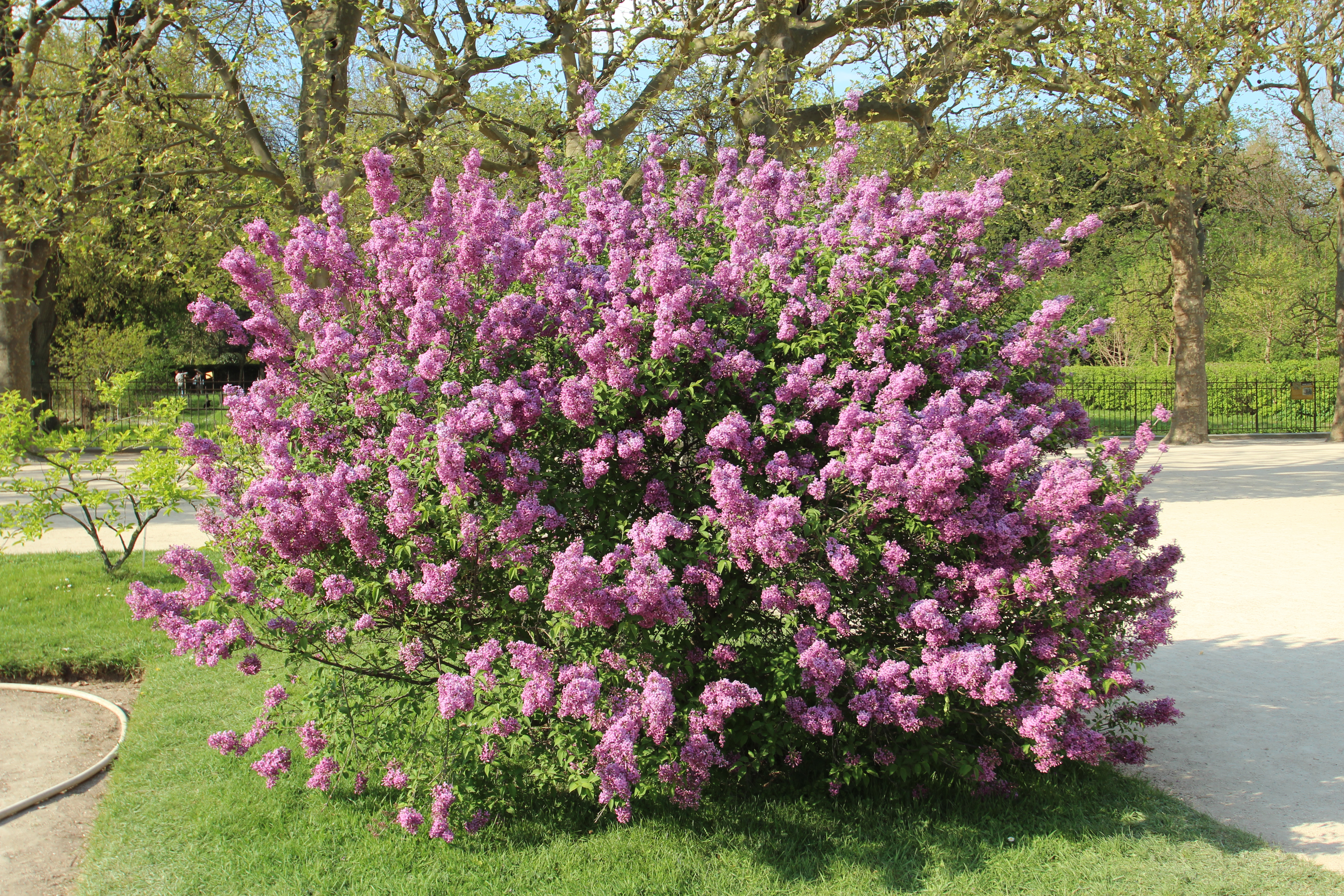
- 'Saugeana' cultivar in bloom
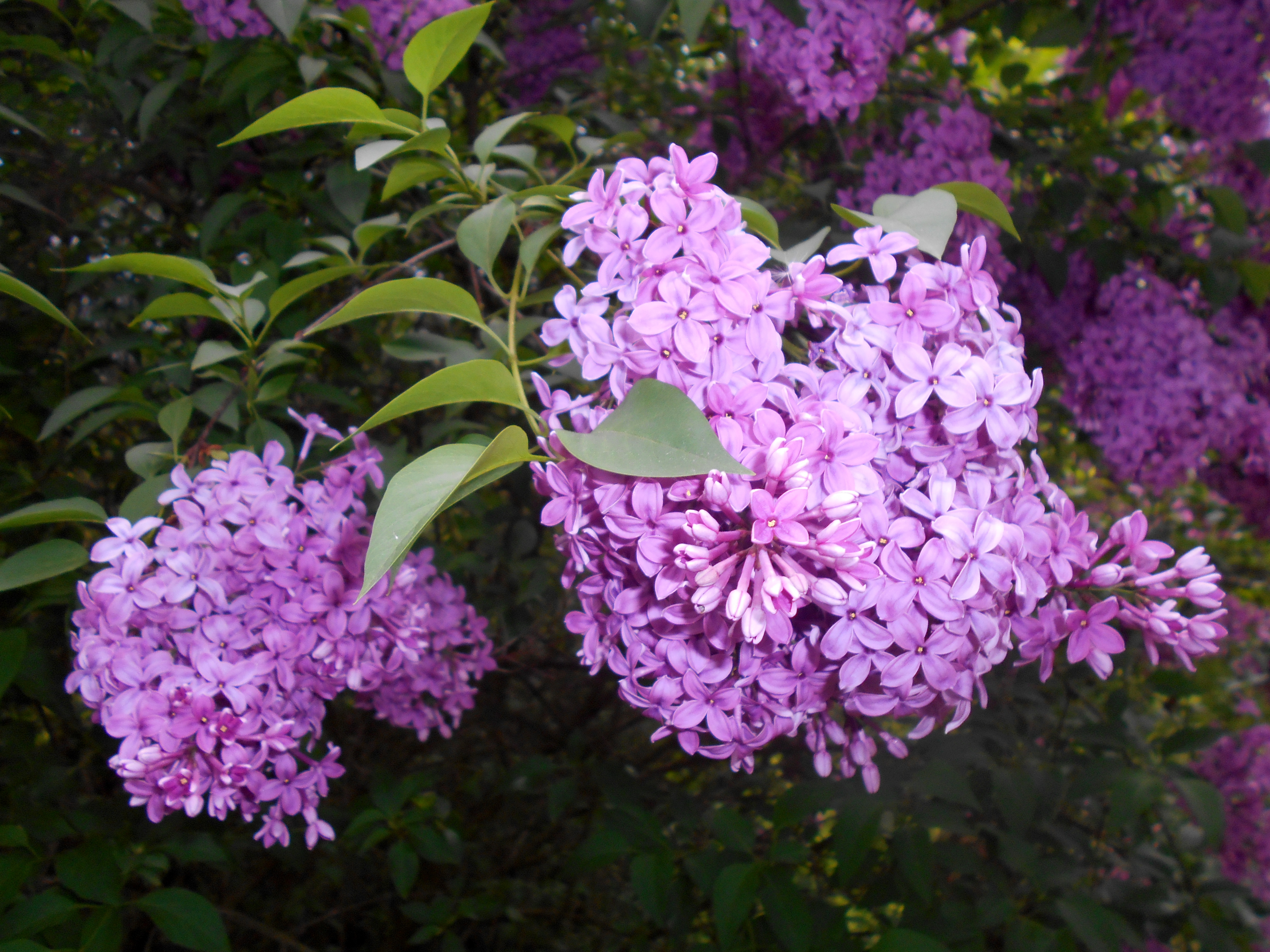
- Close up of inflorescences

Scientific classification
- Kingdom: Plantae
- Clade: Tracheophytes
- Clade: Angiosperms
- Clade: Eudicots
- Clade: Asterids
- Order: Lamiales
- Family: Oleaceae
- Genus: Syringa
- Species: S. × chinensis

Binomial name
- Syringa × chinensis Willd.

Synonyms
- List: Lilac × media (Dum.Cours.) Dum.Cours.; Lilac × varina Dum.Cours.; Liliacum × rothomagense Renault; Syringa × correlata A.Braun; Syringa × dubia Pers.; Syringa × media Dum.Cours.; Syringa × metensis Dippel; Syringa × rothomagensis (Renault) A.Rich.; Syringa × rubra Lodd. ex Dippel; Syringa × speciosa DC.

= Syringa × chinensis =

Nothospecies of flowering plant

Syringa × chinensis, the Chinese lilac or Rouen lilac, is a hybrid species of flowering plant in the family Oleaceae. It was supposedly first noticed growing in Rouen, France in 1777. In spite of its specific and common names, it most probably originated in western Asia. It is the result of a cross between Syringa vulgaris (common lilac) and Syringa persica (Persian lilac). A shrub or shrubby tree reaching 12 ft (4 m), it is hardy in USDA zones 3 to 7, and is recommended for borders, loose hedges, and foundations.
