= USS Lilac =

Tugboat of the United States Navy

History

United States
- Laid down: date unknown
- Launched: 1863
- Acquired: 15 April 1863
- Commissioned: 28 April 1863
- Decommissioned: 16 June 1865
- Stricken: 1865 (est.)
- Fate: Sold, 12 July 1865

General characteristics
- Displacement: 129 tons
- Length: 92 ft (28 m)
- Beam: 19
- Draught: 8 ft (2.4 m)
- Propulsion: steam engine
- Speed: 9 knots
- Complement: 17
- Armament: one 12-pounder rifle; one 12-pounder smoothbore gun

USS Lilac was a steamer acquired by the Union Navy during the American Civil War. She was used by the Navy as a tugboat and in other minor roles.

Lilac, a steam tug built at Philadelphia, Pennsylvania, early in 1863, was acquired by the Navy 15 April 1863; and commissioned at Philadelphia 28 April 1863.

== Assigned to the North Atlantic Blockade ==
The new tug joined the North Atlantic Blockading Squadron at Hampton Roads, Virginia, 2 May. During the remainder of 1863, she operated in the Roads and on the lower James River performing dispatch, picket, and towing duty.

== Lilac carries messages from Alexander Stephens to Lincoln ==
On 4 July 1863, the day of Vicksburg's surrender and the day following the retreat of Robert E. Lee's army from Gettysburg, Pennsylvania, southern tug Torpedo, carrying Alexander Stephens, steamed up to Lilac under a flag of truce to request safe conduct to Washington, D.C., so that the Confederacy's vice president might confer with President Abraham Lincoln as Jefferson Davis' personal emissary. For the next 2 days Lilac carried messages between Union flagship USS Minnesota, Fort Monroe, and Torpedo.

== Lincoln resolves not to communicate with Alexander Stephens ==
However, Lincoln persevered in his resolve to eschew all direct communications with the Confederate leaders, lest such contact be interpreted as recognition of the South's government. On the 6th Lilac bore Stephens word that his request was "...considered inadmissible" and that "customary agents and channels are adequate for all needful military Communications...between the U.S. forces and the insurgents."

On the night of 15 October, accompanied by tug USS Young America, Lilac ascended the James River seeking to capture a Confederate steamer reported above Hog Island. However, the southern ship had fled to safety before the Union ships arrived. On the expedition Lilac shelled a Confederate signal station.

== Ordered down the Eastern seaboard ==
Early in 1864, Rear Adm. Samuel Phillips Lee ordered Lilac to Beaufort, North Carolina, for harbor defense and towing. Her service there continued until December and won her Admiral Lee's praise as "very useful."

As the year waned, Lilac returned to Norfolk, Virginia, to help tighten the noose which Ulysses S. Grant and Porter were closing around Richmond, Virginia. On 4 April, as Lee's valiant army was at last about to be driven from the South's capitol, Lilac captured Confederate Army tug Seaboard at Tree Hill Bridge which spanned the James below Richmond. As the Confederacy crumbled, Lilac continued to operate in the James until she steamed north late in May.

== Post-war decommissioning, sale, and civilian career ==
She decommissioned 16 June 1865 and was sold at public auction at New York City to H. G. Farrington 12 July 1865. Redocumented as Eutaw 5 October 1865, the tug served commercial shipping until abandoned in 1888.
