= Marusho =

Motorcycle company

Marusho Motor Co., Ltd.
- Company type: Stock company
- Industry: Automotive industry
- Founded: April 1948
- Defunct: 1967 (merged into Honda)
- Fate: Defunct
- Headquarters: Hamamatsu, Shizuoka Prefecture, Japan
- Key people: Tadashi Itō
- Products: Lilac model motorcycle
- Revenue: 10,000,000 yen

Marusho Motor Co., Ltd. (丸正自動車製造株式会社, marushō jidōsha seizō kabushiki gaisha) was a company that manufactured motorcycles from 1948 to 1967. The company's Lilac model motorcycle was recognized by the Society of Automotive Engineers of Japan (in Japanese), who included the 1950 Marusho Lilac ML as one of their 240 Landmarks of Japanese Automotive Technology.

== History ==
Masashi Itō started Marusho in Hamamatsu, Japan, in 1948 after being apprenticed with Soichiro Honda. The company produced shaft driven models like the Lilac, and showcased its technical prowess to the world in the Mount Asama Volcano Race, competing well against the likes of Honda, Meguro, Yamaha, and Suzuki. Company founder Masashi Itō died in 2005 at the age of 92.

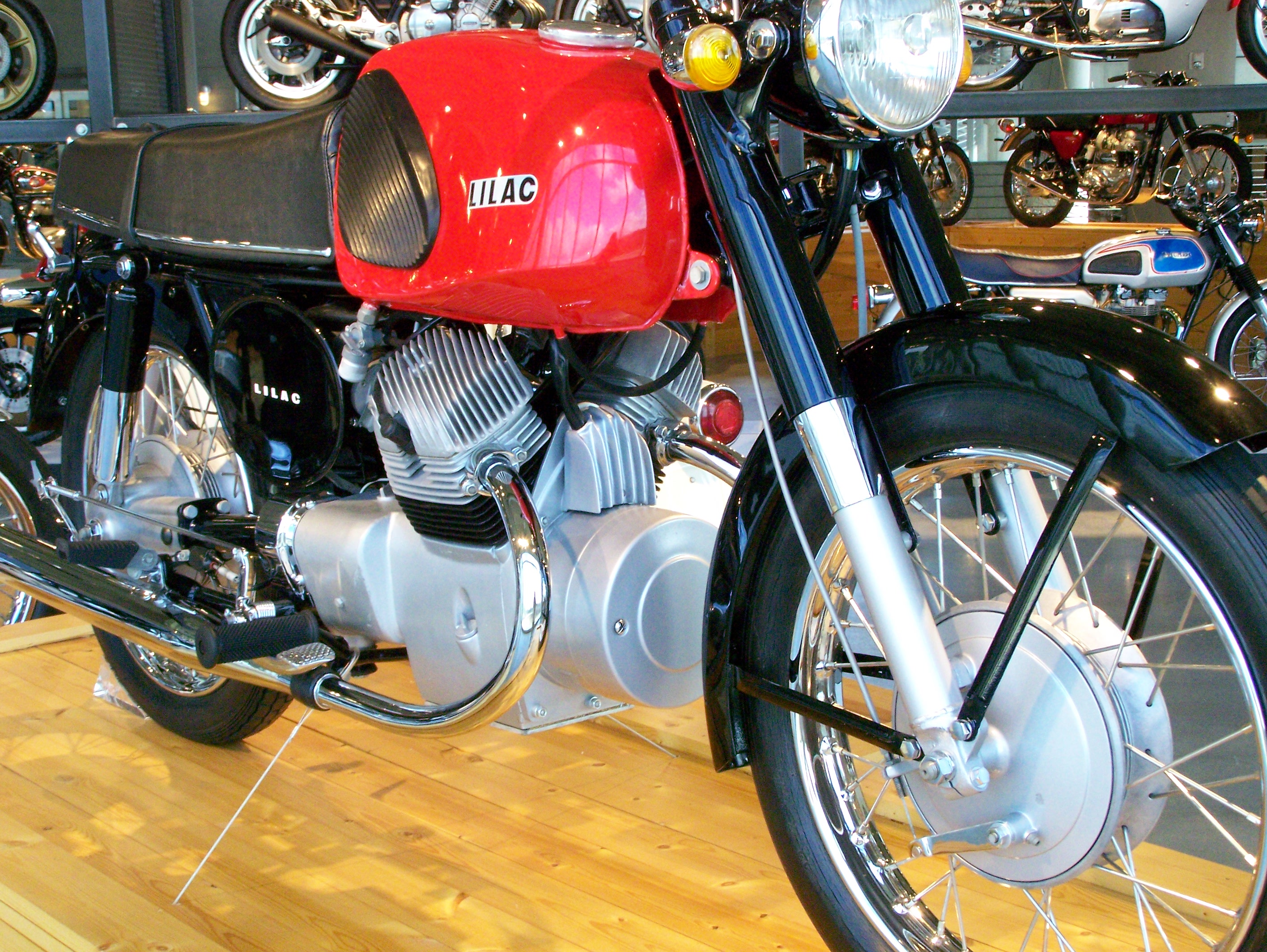
Marusho Lilac V-twin

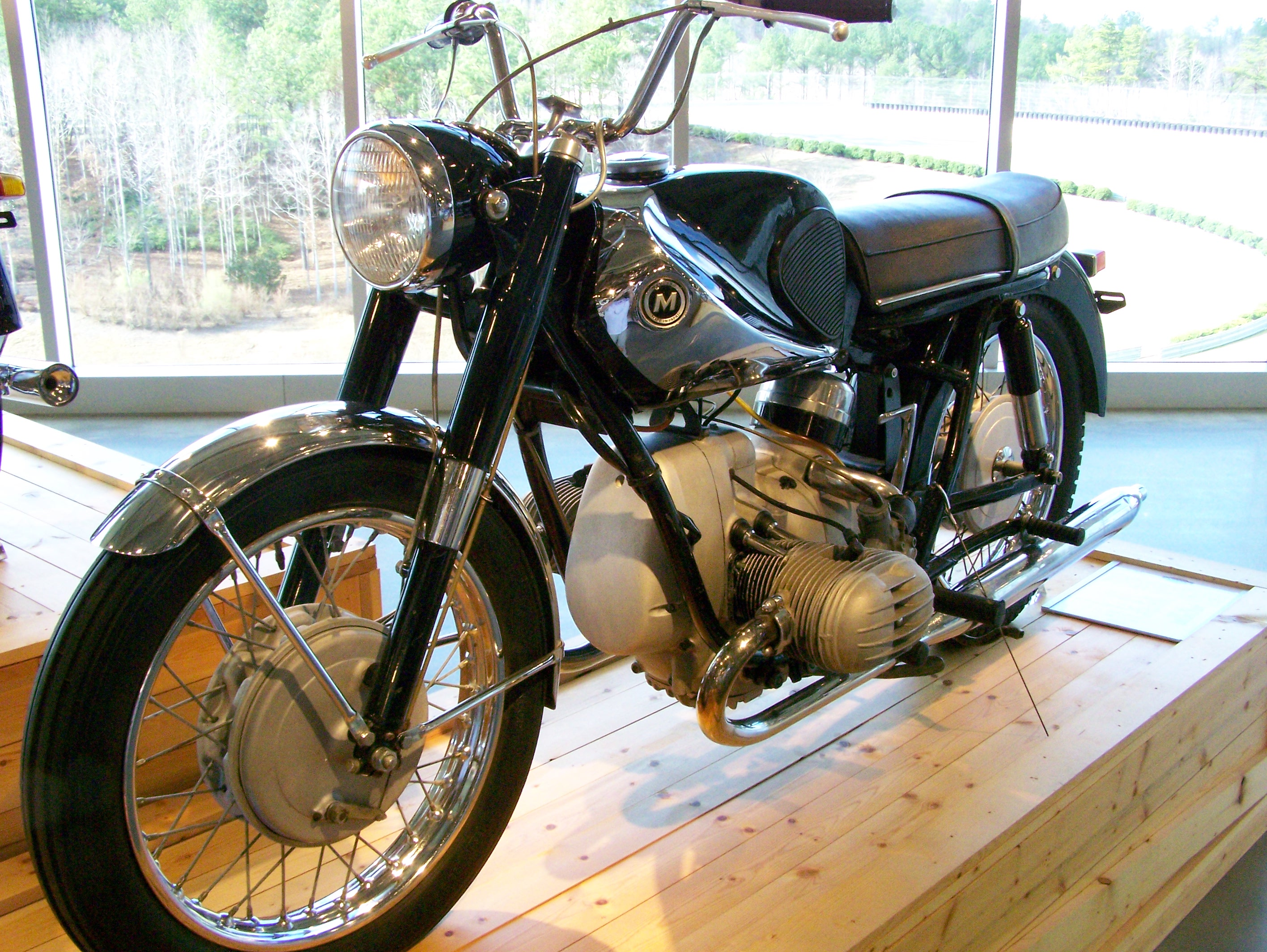
Marusho Lilac flat-twin

== Lilac motorcycles ==
- Dragon (350cc)
- Lancer (350cc)
- AQ (125cc)
- UY (250cc)
- BR (175cc)
- PV (125cc)
- LS (250cc)
- ML 1950 150cc 2.43 kW/4000rpm
- LB 1952 150cc
- KD 1952 150cc
- LS38 Lilac.Lancer.MkV 1959 250cc 14.92 kW/8000rpm
- DP90 New.Baby.Lilac 1958 90cc 2.94 kW/5000rpm
- LS18 MkII 1960 250cc 13.1 kW/6800rpm
- C130 1964 125cc 10.9 kW/11000rpm
- JF Baby.Lilac 1953 90cc 2.4 kW/5500rpm
- Lilac.R92 Marusho.ST 1964 500cc 26.2 kW/6300rpm
- Lilac.R92 Marusho.Magnum.Electra 1966 500cc 27.9 kW/7000rpm
- Lilac.CF40 1960 125cc 7.72 kW/8000rpm
- Lilac.Lance.SW 1955 400cc 8.82 kW/4800rpm
- Lilac.Lance.SY 1955 250cc 6.25 kW/4700rpm
