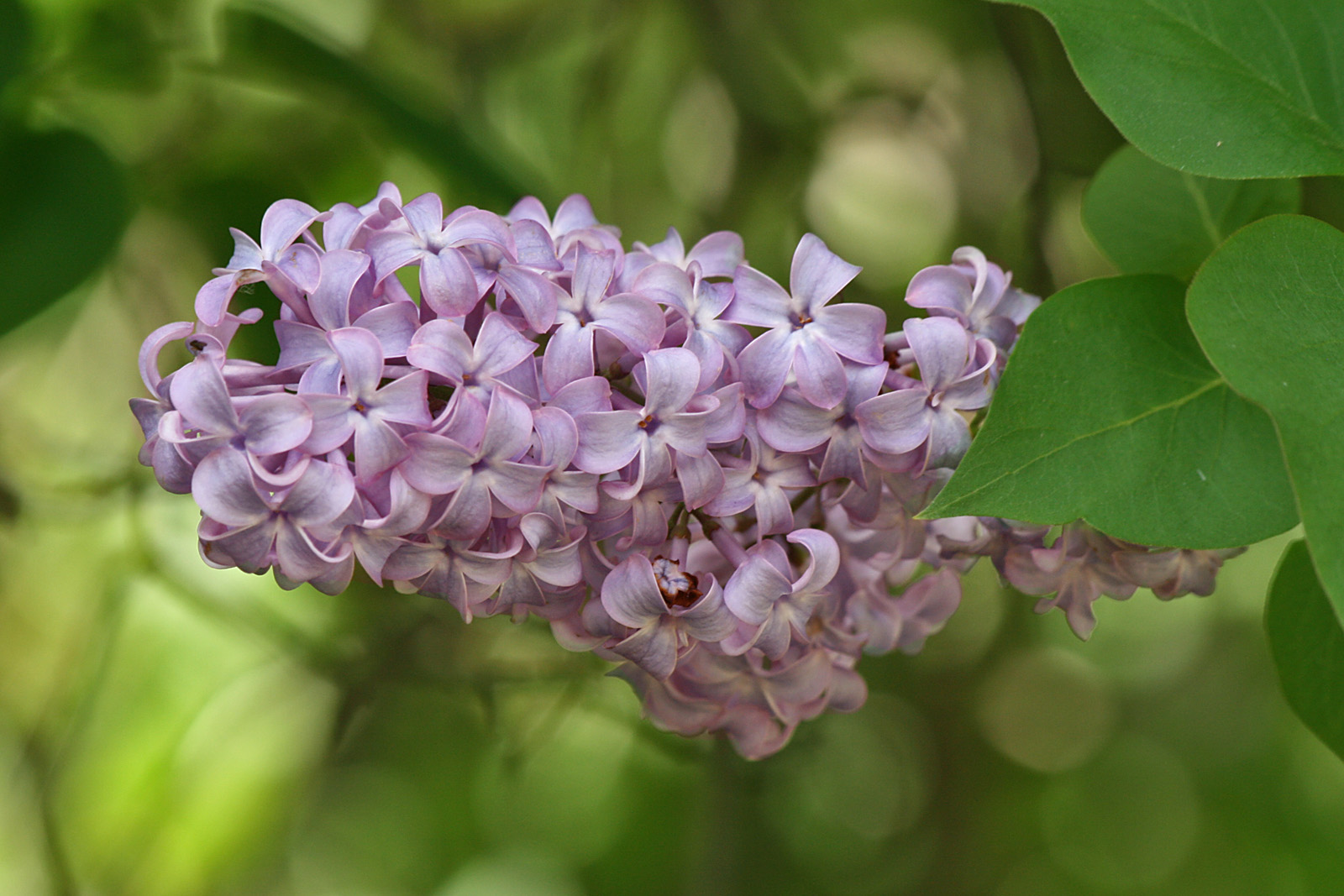

Conservation status
- Least Concern (IUCN 3.1)

Scientific classification
- Kingdom: Plantae
- Clade: Tracheophytes
- Clade: Angiosperms
- Clade: Eudicots
- Clade: Asterids
- Order: Lamiales
- Family: Oleaceae
- Genus: Syringa
- Species: S. vulgaris

Binomial name
- Syringa vulgaris L.

Synonyms
- List: Lilac vulgaris (L.) Lam.; Liliacum vulgare (L.) Renault; Syringa cordifolia Stokes; Syringa latifolia Salisb.; Syringa lilac Thouin

= Syringa vulgaris =

Plant species in the olive family

Syringa vulgaris, the lilac or common lilac, is a species of flowering plant in the olive family, Oleaceae. Native to the Balkan Peninsula, it is widely cultivated for its scented flowers in Europe (particularly the north and west) and North America.

== Description ==
Syringa vulgaris is a large deciduous shrub or multi-stemmed small tree, growing to 6–7 metres (20–23 ft) high. It produces secondary shoots from the base or roots, with stem diameters up to 20 centimetres (8 in), which in the course of decades may produce a small clonal thicket. (Note: In second-growth woodlands of New England, a thicket of lilac may be the first indication of the cellar-hole of a vanished 19th-century timber-framed farmhouse.) The branch ends may be fasciated. The bark is gray to gray-brown, smooth on young stems, longitudinally furrowed, and flaking on older stems.

The leaves are simple, 4–12 cm (2–5 in) and 3–8 cm broad, light green to glaucous, oval to cordate (heart-shaped), with pinnate leaf venation, a mucronate apex, and an entire margin. They are arranged in opposite pairs or occasionally in whorls of three.

The flowers have a tubular base to the corolla 6–10 mm long with an open four-lobed apex 5–8 mm across, usually lilac to mauve, occasionally white. They are arranged in dense, terminal panicles 8–18 cm (3–7 in) long. The fruit is a dry, smooth, brown capsule, 1–2 cm long, splitting in two to release the two-winged seeds.

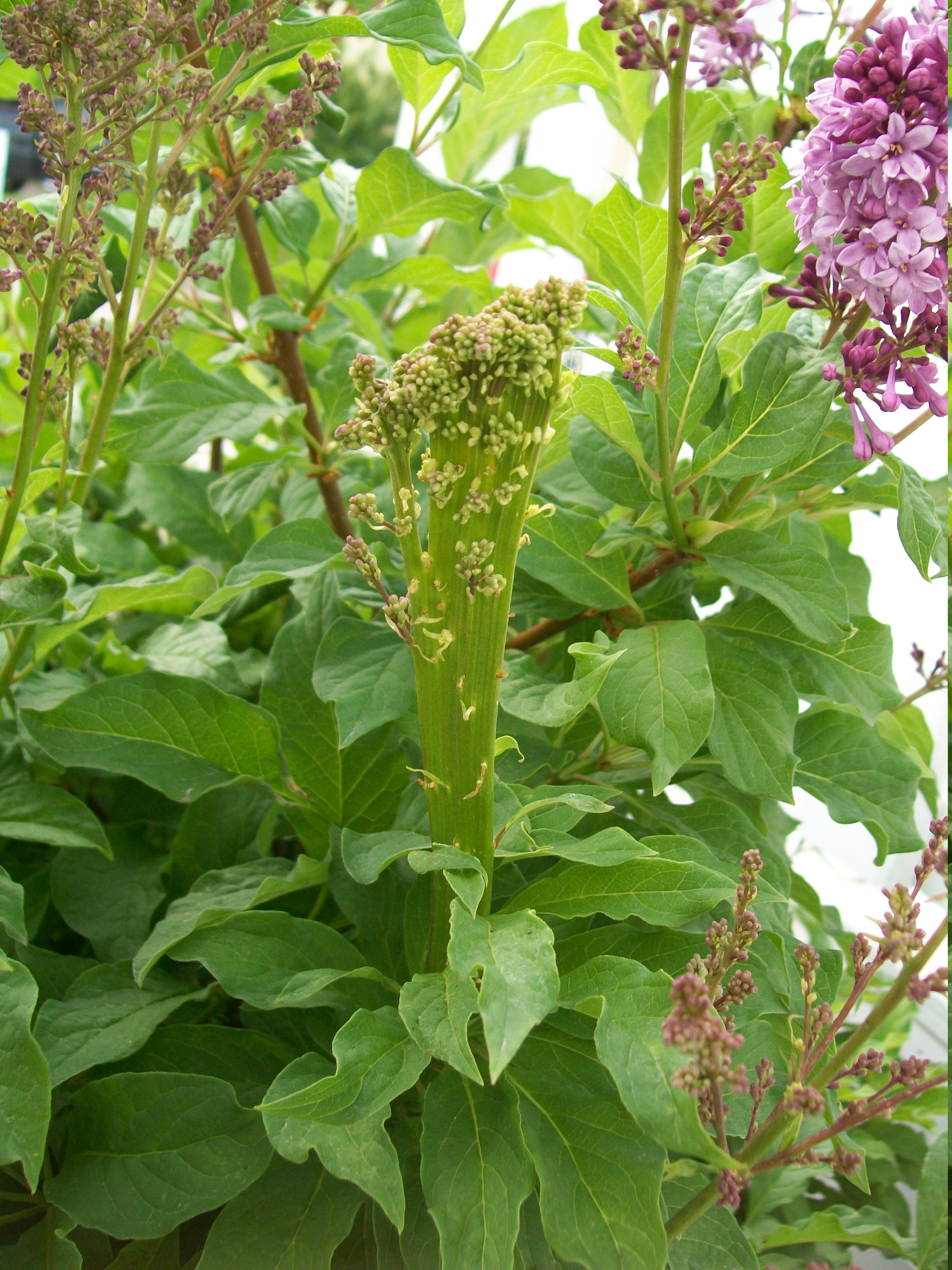
Branch end

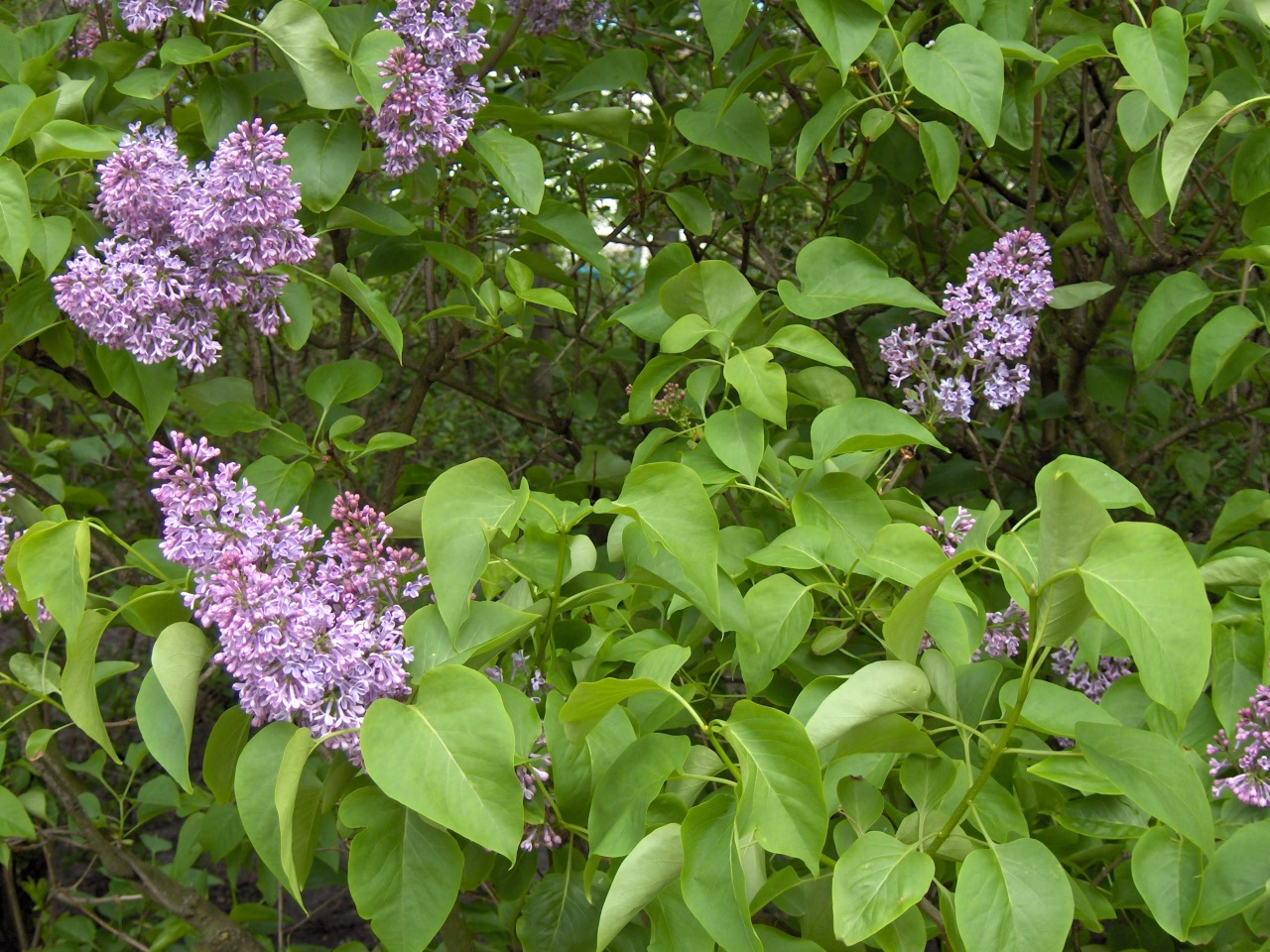
Leaves and flowers

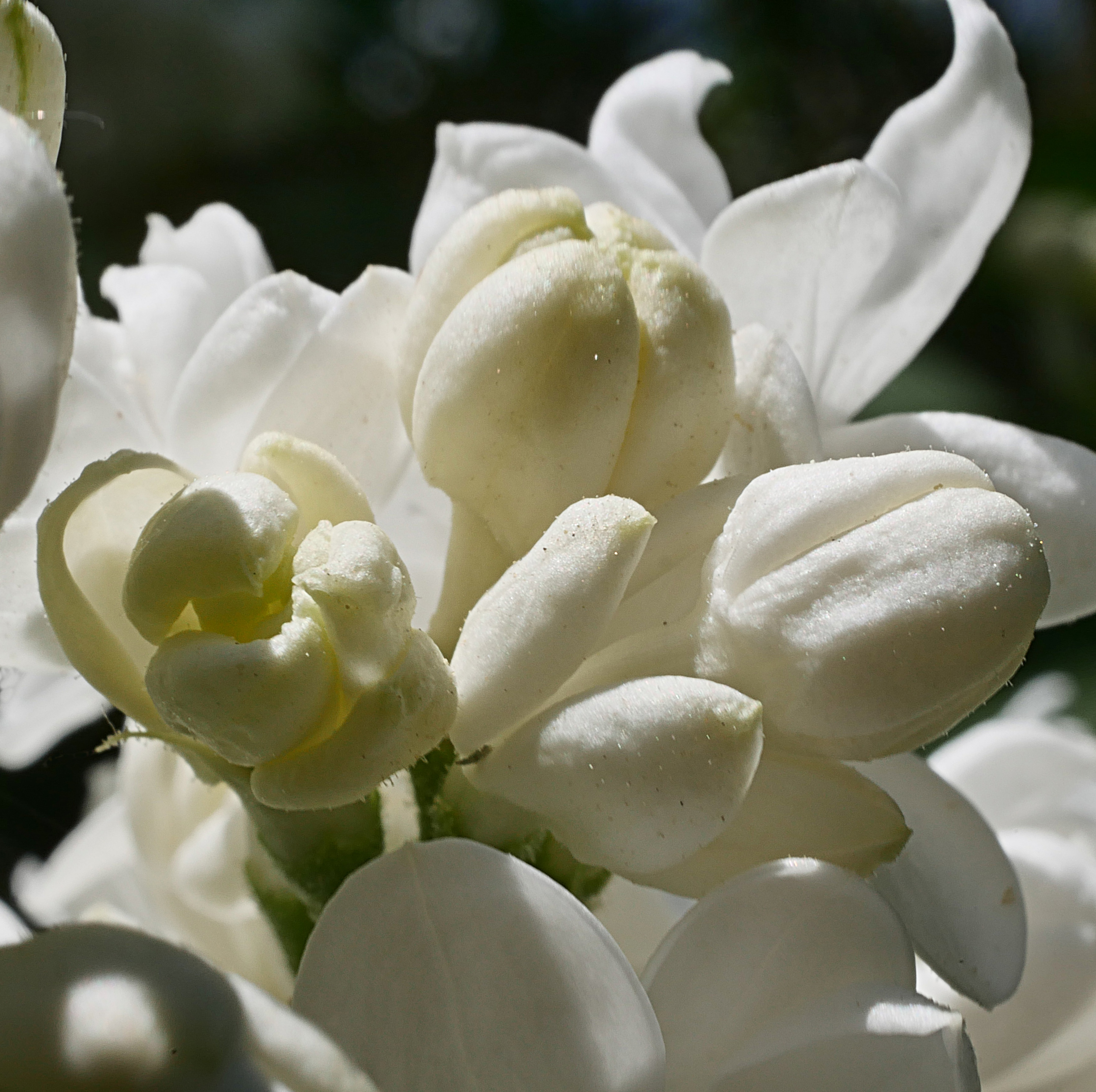
Buds of white lilac

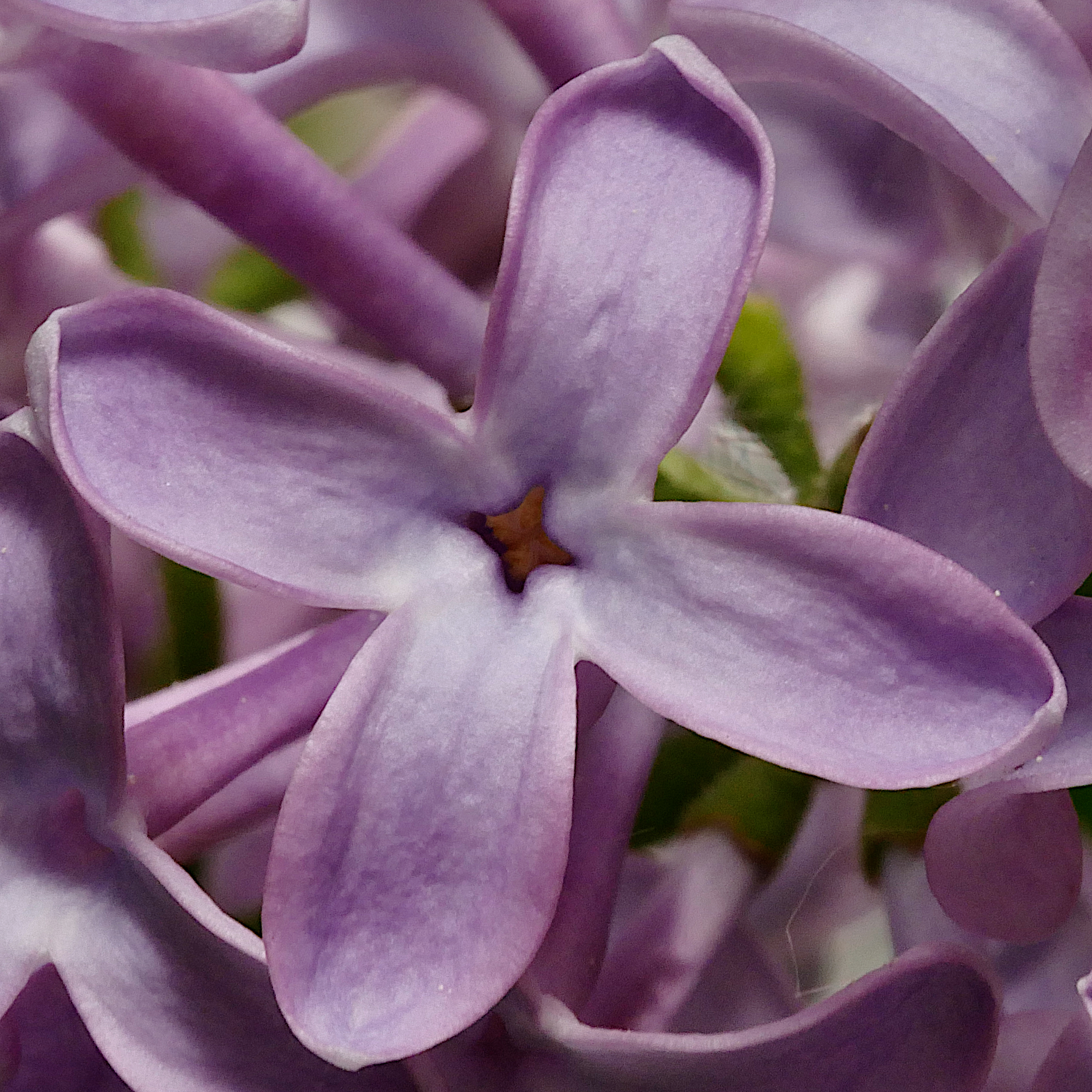
Close-up of flower

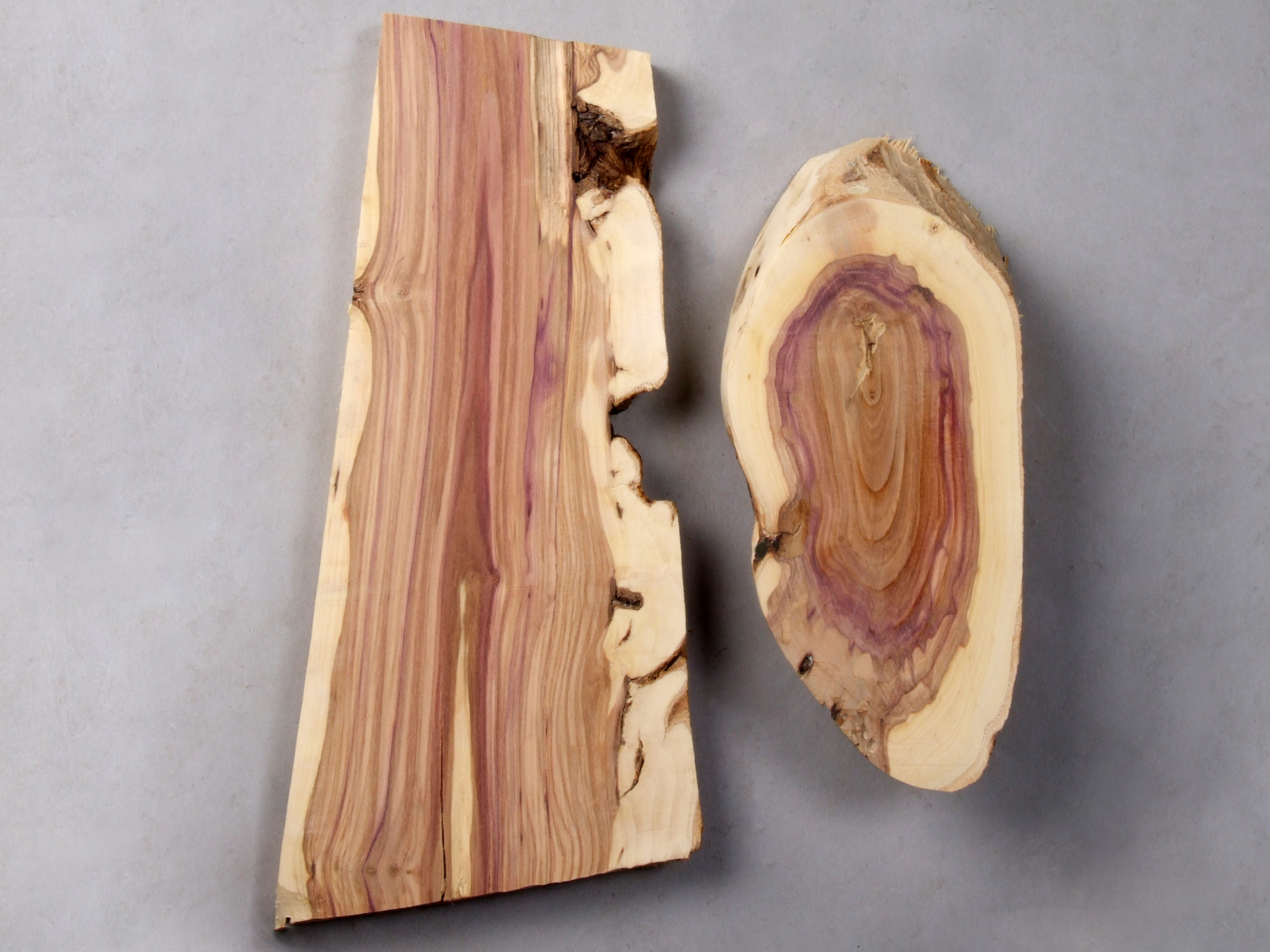
Wood

== Taxonomy ==
Syringa vulgaris was first formally described by Carl Linnaeus in 1753 and the description was published in Species Plantarum. The specific epithet vulgaris is Latin for "common" (in the sense of "widespread").

== Distribution and habitat ==
The species is native to the southern Balkan Peninsula, where it occurs in Serbia, North Macedonia, Bulgaria and bordering regions, chiefly south of the Danube. It grows on rocky hills. Grown in spring for its scented flowers, the large shrub or small tree is widely cultivated and has been naturalized in parts of Europe, Asia, and North America. It is not regarded as an aggressive species. It is found in the wild in widely scattered sites, usually in the vicinity of past or present human habitations.

== Cultivation ==
The lilac is a very popular ornamental plant in gardens and parks because of its attractive, sweet-smelling flowers, which appear in early summer just before many of the roses and other summer flowers come into bloom.

In late summer, lilacs can be attacked by powdery mildew, specifically Erysiphe syringae, one of the Erysiphaceae. No fall color is seen, and the seed clusters have no aesthetic appeal.

Common lilac tends to flower profusely in alternate years, a habit that can be improved by deadheading the flower clusters after the color has faded and before seeds, few of which are fertile, form. At the same time, twiggy growth on shoots that have flowered more than once or twice can be cut to a strong, outward-growing side shoot.

It is widely naturalised in western and northern Europe. In a sign of its complete naturalization in North America, it was selected as the state flower of the state of New Hampshire, in that state's wording because it "is symbolic of that hardy character of the men and women of the Granite State". Additional hardiness for Canadian gardens was bred for in a series of S. vulgaris hybrids by Isabella Preston, who introduced many of the later-blooming varieties. Their later-developing flower buds are better protected from late spring frosts. The Syringa × prestoniae hybrids range primarily in the pink and lavender shades.

=== Garden history ===
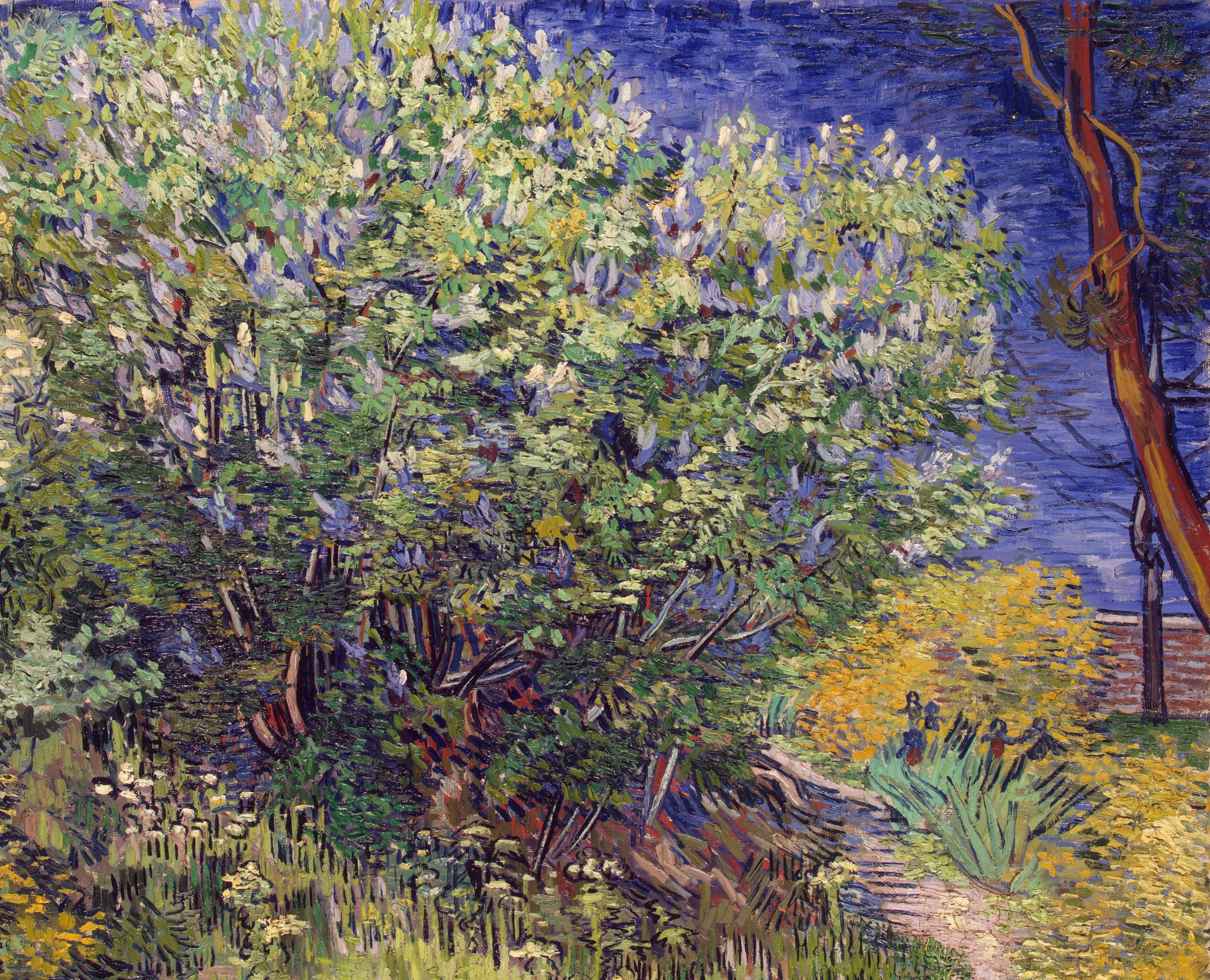
Lilac Bush, by Vincent van Gogh, 1889

Lilacs—both S. vulgaris and S. × persica the finer, smaller "Persian lilac", now considered a natural hybrid—were introduced into northern European gardens at the end of the 16th century, from Ottoman gardens. (Note: The botanic homeland of S. vulgaris was subsequently identified in 1828, when naturalist Anton Rocher found truly wild specimens in Balkans.) The Holy Roman Emperor's ambassador to the Ottoman Empire, Ogier Ghiselin de Busbecq, is generally credited with supplying lilac cuttings to the Dutch horticulturist Carolus Clusius about 1562. Well-connected botanists, such as the great herbalist John Gerard, soon had the rarity in their gardens: Gerard noted that he had lilacs growing "in very great plenty" in 1597. However, lilacs were never mentioned by Shakespeare (Note: Their first appearance by name in English print was in the OED dated to 1625.) and the 19th-century botanist John Loudon was of the opinion that the Persian lilac was introduced into English gardens by John Tradescant the Elder in the 17th century. Tradescant's source for information on the lilac, and perhaps ultimately for the plants, was Italian naturalist Pietro Andrea Mattioli, as one can tell from a unique copy of Tradescant's plant list in his Lambeth garden, an adjunct of his Musaeum Tradescantianum; it was printed, though probably not published, in 1634, and lists Lilac Matthioli. That Tradescant's "lilac of Mattioli's" was a white one is shown by Elias Ashmole's manuscript list, Trees found in Mrs Tredescants Ground when it came into my possession (1662): "Syringa alba".

In the American colonies, lilacs were introduced in the 18th century. Peter Collinson, FRS, wrote to the Pennsylvania gardener and botanist John Bartram, proposing to send him some, and remarked that John Custis of Virginia had a fine "collection", which Ann Leighton interpreted as signifying common and Persian lilacs, in both purple and white, "the entire range of lilacs possible" at the time.

It is also slowly making its way into the world of bonsai where it is loved for its flowers and multistem features.

=== Cultivars ===
Most garden plants of S. vulgaris are cultivars, the majority of which do not exceed 4–5 m (13–16 ft) tall. Between 1876 and 1927, the nurseryman Victor Lemoine of Nancy, France, introduced over 153 named cultivars, many of which are considered classics and still in commerce today. Lemoine's "French lilacs" extended the limited color range to include deeper, more saturated hues, and many of them are double-flowered "sports", with the stamens replaced by extra petals.

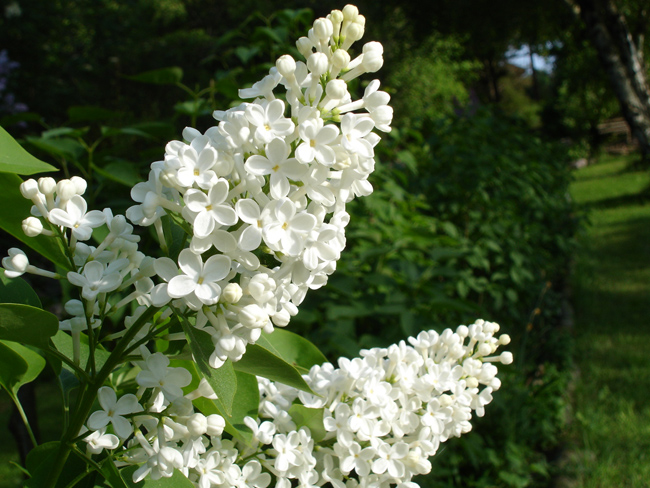
'Alba'

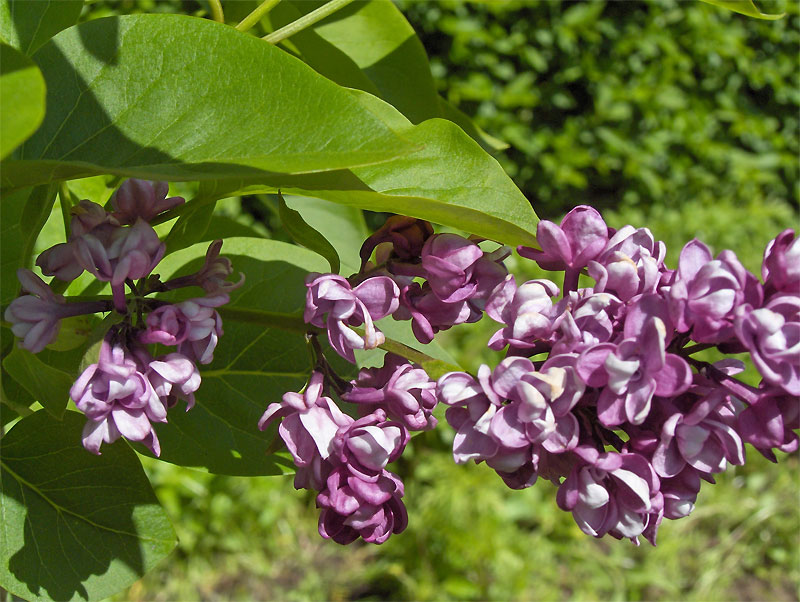
'Charles Joly'

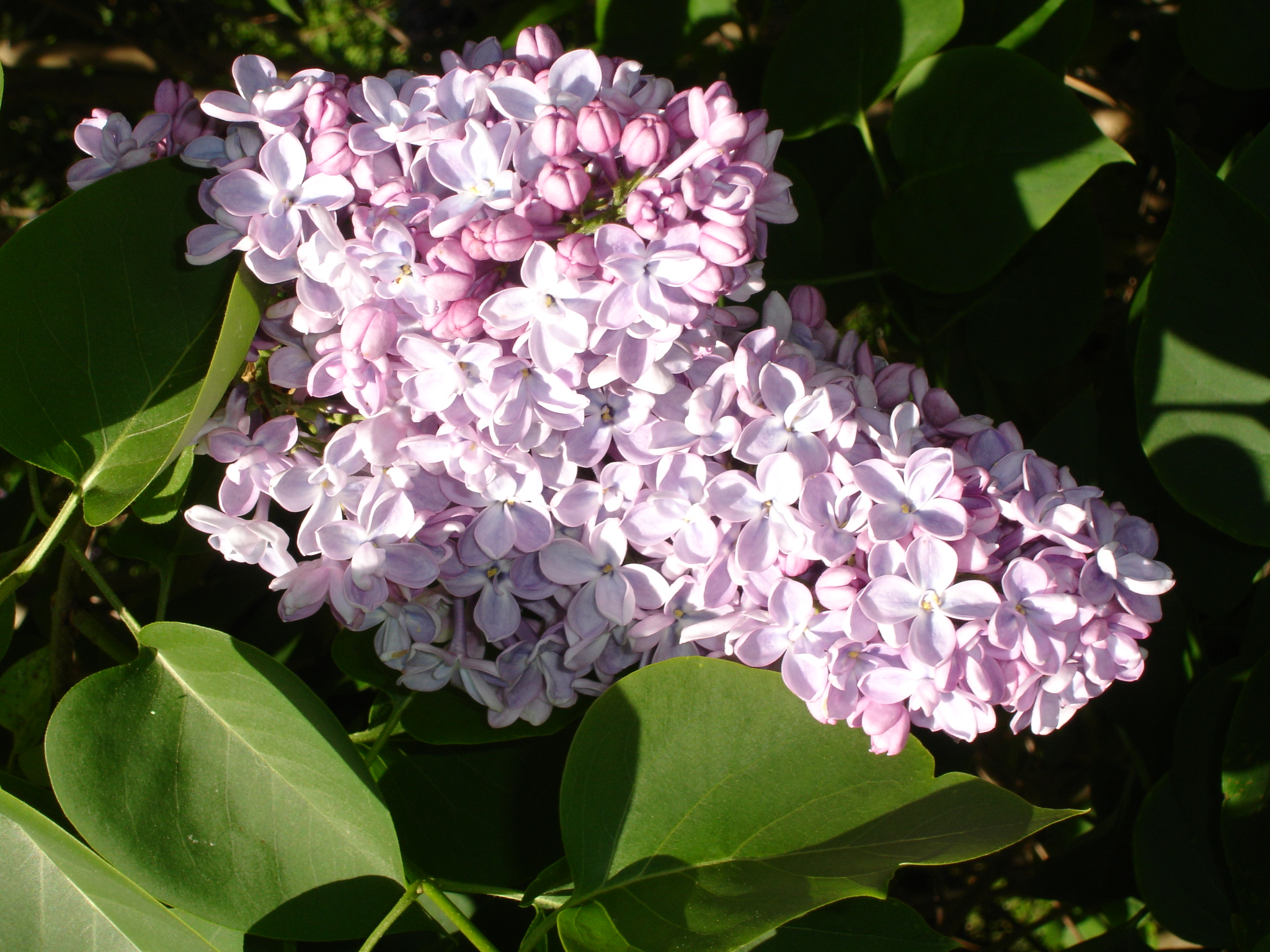
'Corondel'

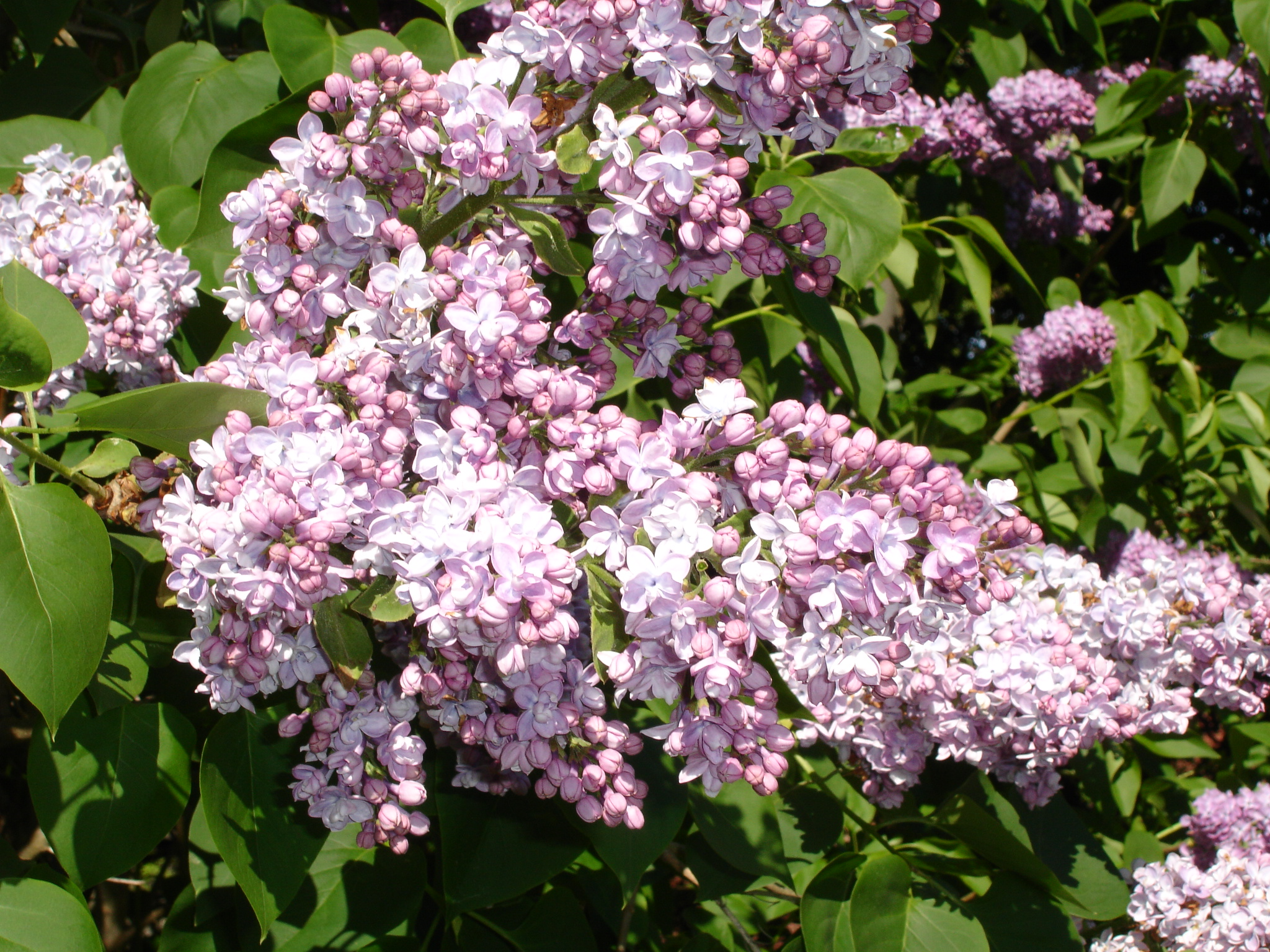
'Etna'

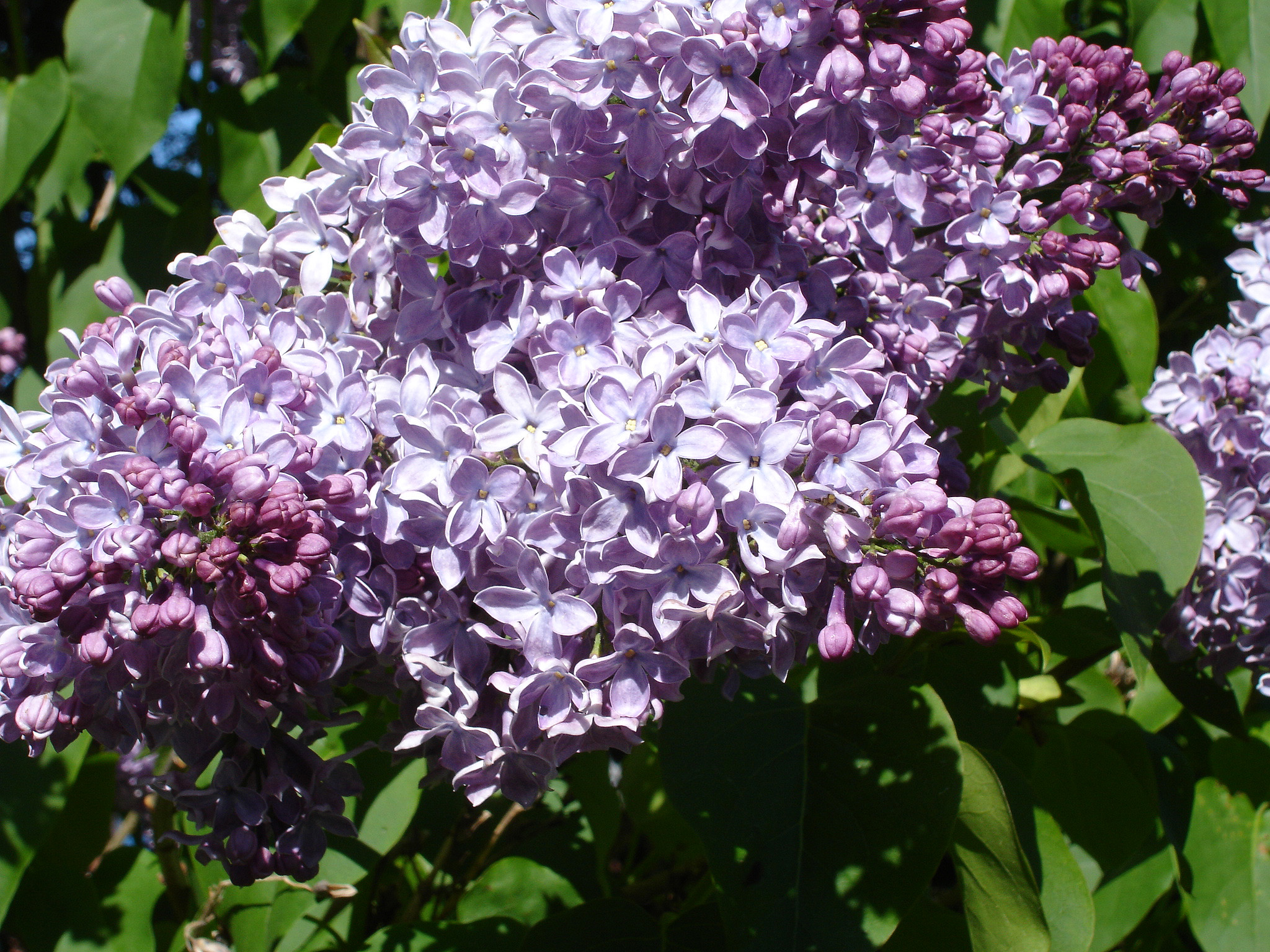
'Mme. Francisque Morel'

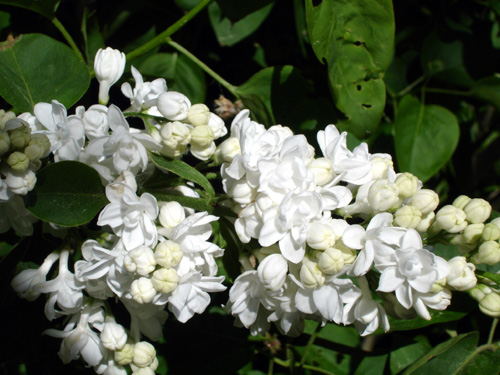
'Maréchal Foch'

==== AGM cultivars ====
The following cultivars of S. vulgaris have received the Royal Horticultural Society's Award of Garden Merit.

With single flowers:

- 'Andenken an Ludwig Späth' (deep pink/red)
- 'Esther Staley' (S. × hyacinthiflora - pale lilac flowers)
- 'Firmament' (pale lilac-blue)
- 'Sensation' (purple flowers edged white)
- 'Vestale' (pure white flowers)

With double flowers:

- 'Katherine Havemeyer' (lilac)
- 'Madame Lemoine' (white)
- 'Mrs Edward Harding' (deep pink/red)
- 'Primrose' (pale yellow flowers)

== Uses ==
The flowers of common lilac are edible and used for flavoring honeys, sugars, food and other sweets.
