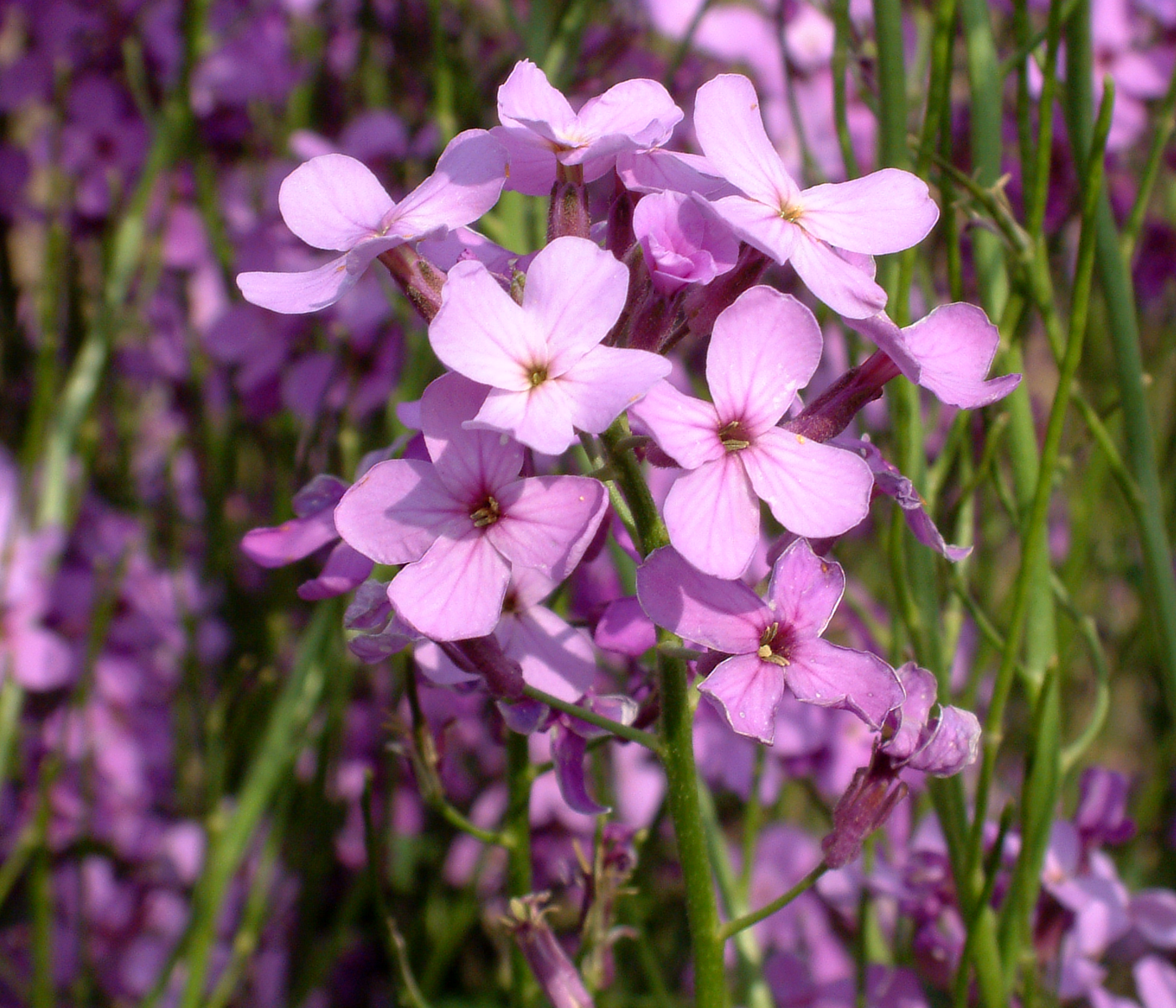

Conservation status
- Apparently Secure (NatureServe)

Scientific classification
- Kingdom: Plantae
- Clade: Tracheophytes
- Clade: Angiosperms
- Clade: Eudicots
- Clade: Rosids
- Order: Brassicales
- Family: Brassicaceae
- Genus: Hesperis
- Species: H. matronalis

Binomial name
- Hesperis matronalis L.

Subspecies
- Hesperis matronalis subsp. candida (Kit.) Hegi & Em.Schmid; Hesperis matronalis subsp. cladotricha (Borbás) Hayek; Hesperis matronalis subsp. matronalis; Hesperis matronalis subsp. nivea (Baumg.) E.P.Perrier; Hesperis matronalis subsp. schurii Soó; Hesperis matronalis subsp. sintenisii (F.Dvořák) A.Duran; Hesperis matronalis subsp. vrabelyiana (Schur) Soó

= Hesperis matronalis =

Species of flowering plant in the cabbage family

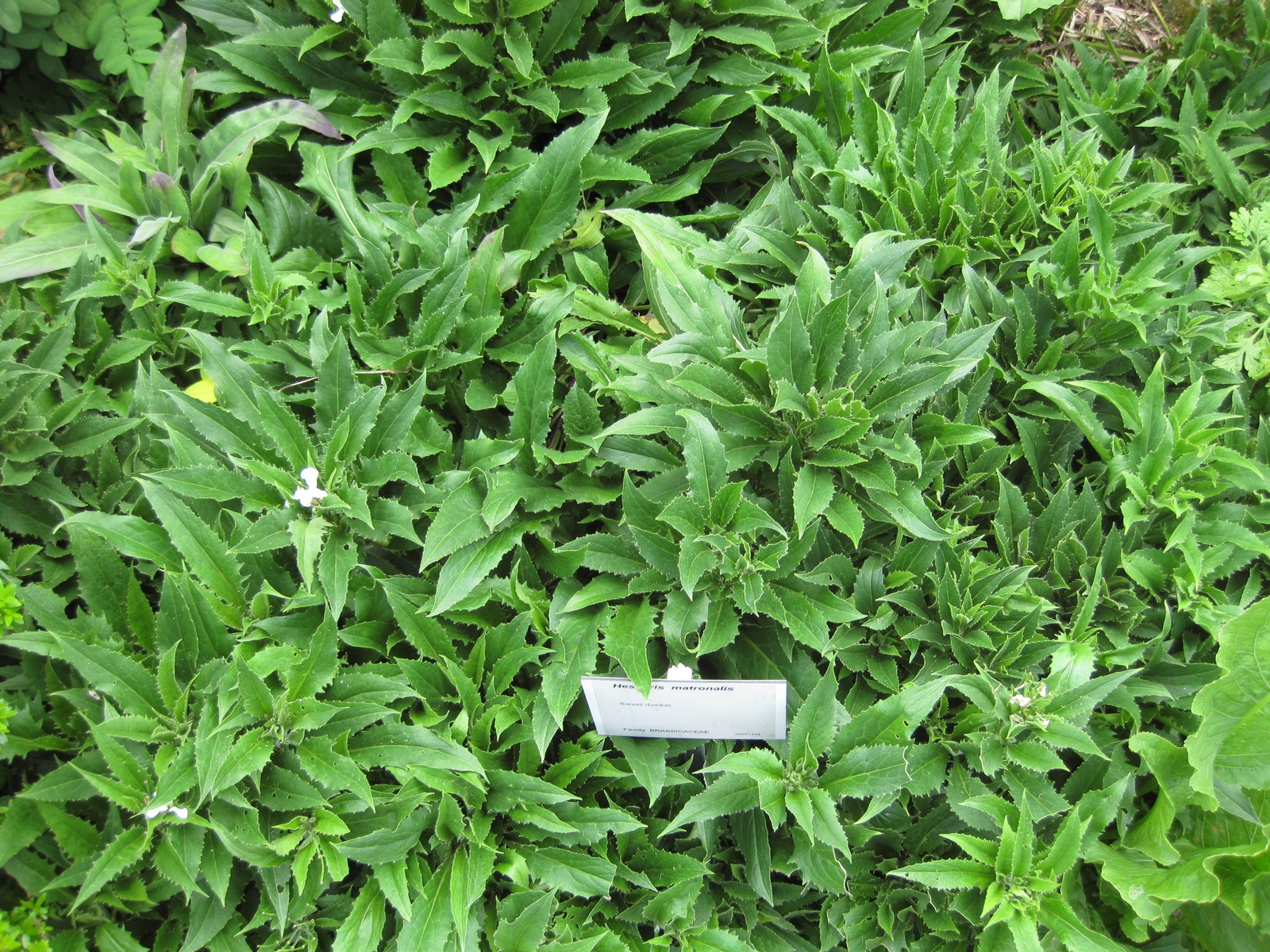
H. matronalis foliage

Hesperis matronalis is an herbaceous flowering plant species in the family Brassicaceae. It has numerous common names, including dame's rocket, damask-violet, dame's-violet, dames-wort, dame's gilliflower, night-scented gilliflower, queen's gilliflower, rogue's gilliflower, sweet rocket, and mother-of-the-evening.

These plants are biennials or short-lived perennials, native to Eurasia and cultivated in many other areas of the world for their attractive, spring-blooming flowers. In some of those areas, it has escaped from cultivation and become a weed species. The genus name Hesperis was probably given because the scent of the flowers becomes more conspicuous towards evening (Hespera is the Greek word for evening).

== Description ==
Hesperis matronalis grows 100 cm or taller, with multiple upright, hairy stems. Typically, the first year of growth produces a mound of foliage, and flowering occurs the second year; the plants are normally biennials, but a number of races can be short-lived perennials. The plants have showy blooms in early to mid spring. The leaves are alternately arranged on upright stems and lanceolate-shaped; they typically have very short petioles (or lack them) and have toothed margins, but sometimes are entire and are widest at the base. The foliage has short hairs on the top and bottom surfaces that give the leaves a somewhat rough feel. The larger leaves are around 12 cm long and over 4 cm wide. In early spring, a thick mound of low-growing foliage is produced; during flowering the lower parts of the stems are generally unbranched and denuded of foliage and the top of the blooming plant might have a few branches that end in inflorescences.

The plentiful, fragrant flowers are produced in large, showy, terminal racemes that can be 30+ cm tall and elongate as the flowers of the inflorescence bloom. When stems have both flowers and fruits, the weight sometimes causes the stems to bend. Each flower is large (2 cm across), with four petals. Flower coloration varies, with different shades of lavender and purple most common, but white, pink, and even some flowers with mixed colors exist in cultivated forms. A few different double-flowered varieties also exist. The four petals are clawed and hairless. The flowers have six stamens in two groups, the four closest to the ovary are longer than the two oppositely positioned. Stigmas are two-lobed. The four sepals are erect and form a mock tube around the claws of the petals and are also colored similarly to the petals.

Some plants may bloom until August, but warm weather greatly shortens the duration on each flower's blooming. Seeds are produced in thin fruits 5–14 cm long pods, containing two rows of seeds separated by a dimple. The fruit are terete and open by way of glabrous valves, constricted between the seeds like a pea pod. Seeds are oblong, 3–4 mm long and 1–1.5 mm wide.

In North America, Hesperis matronalis is often confused with native Phlox species that have similar large showy flower clusters. They can be distinguished from each other by foliage and flower differences: dame's rocket has alternately arranged leaves and four petals per flower, while phloxes have opposite leaves and five petals.

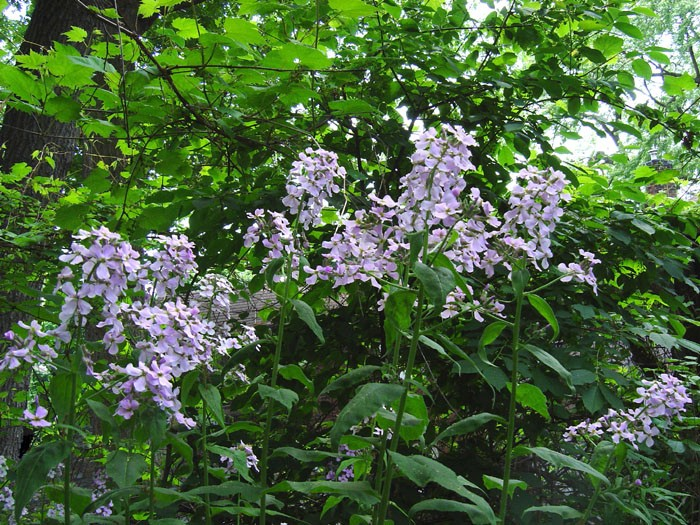
Stand of H. matronalis in a forested setting

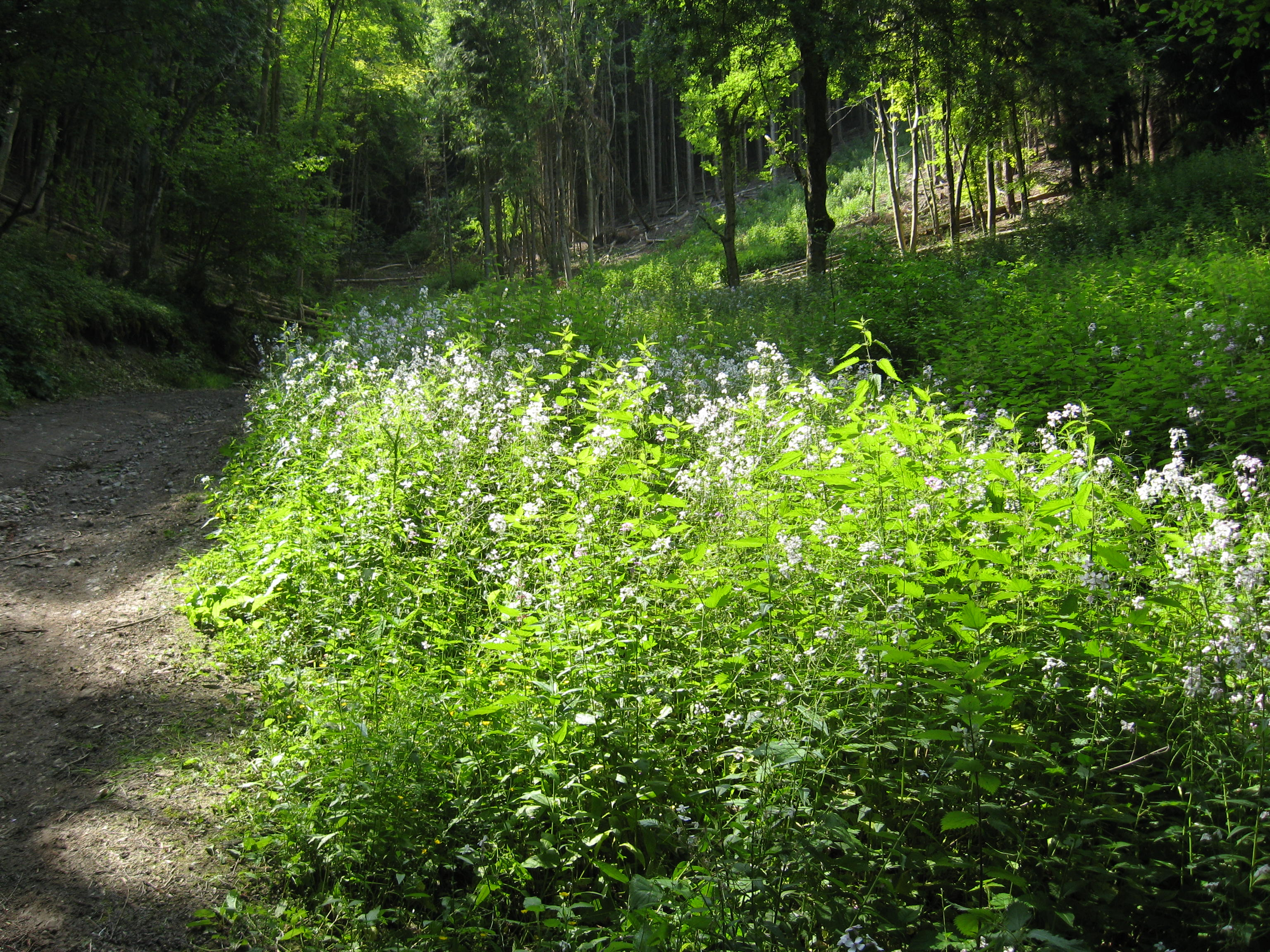
Naturalized H. matronalis in Whitelands Wood, Butser Hill, England

== Taxonomy ==
Hesperis matronalis was given its modern scientific name by Carl Linnaeus in his book Species Plantarum in 1753.

=== Names ===
The genus name, Hesperis, means "of the evening", possibly referring to the strong fragrance of the flowers late in the day. The species name, matronalis, means "of older married women".

One of the most frequently used names for this species is "sweet rocket". Though the name violet is strongly associated with Viola genus, in the past it was widely applied to other flowers including this species as "Damask violet" in English and "Viola Damascena" in Latin, both referring to the city of Damascus in Syria. The French name "Violette de Damas" also refers to Damascus, but was mistaken for "dames" giving rise to the common name "dame's violet". The variant "dame's gilliflower" comes from this earlier name. The name "queen's gilliflower" was a very popular name for the flower in the 16th century, possibly as a way to honor Queen Elizabeth I. Later the "rogue's gilliflower" or "queen's rogues" may have originally been "rouge", and therefore meaning red gilliflower. In America the dame's violet became "dame's rocket", combining dame with the common English name for several cabbage family plants, "rocket", from the French "roquette" (Eruca sativa).

In 1769 John Hill's Family Herbal called it "eveweed", yet another reference to its nighttime scent along with "night-smelling rocket", "vesper flower", and "mother-of-the-evening". The double cultivar is called "whitsun gilliflower" while the standard species is occasionally called "whitsun gillies" in Warwickshire. The names "close sciences" and "coses sciences" are a modification of the Devonshire name "sciney" which in turn comes from the older Latin name "damascene" used for the plant. Other English names include "dames wort" and "red rocket".

It shares the name "summer lilac" with Buddleia davidii. The name "winter gilliflower" is much more often applied to Cheiranthus cheiri or Galanthus nivalis (snowdrops), but it is rarely applied to sweet rocket. With many other plants like Artemisia vulgaris it is named as "motherwort", though very seldomly.

== Cultivation ==
Hesperis matronalis has been a cultivated species for a long time, and grows best in full sun to partial shade where soils are moist with good drainage. It is undemanding and self-seeds quickly, forming dense stands. Extensive monotypic stands of dame's rocket are visible from great distances; these dense collections of plants have the potential to crowd out native species when growing outside of cultivated areas.

The successful spread of dame's rocket in North America is attributed to its prolific seed production and because the seeds are often included in prepackaged "wildflower seed" mixes sold for "naturalizing". The plants typically produce a low-lying rosette of foliage the first year; in subsequent years, blooming and seed production occurs in tandem throughout the blooming season. This species is commonly found in roadside ditches, dumps and in open woodland settings, where it is noticed when in bloom. Although it makes an attractive, hardy garden plant, it has been found to be ecologically invasive in North America.

Hesperis matronalis is propagated by seeds, but desirable individuals, including the double-flowering forms, are propagated from cuttings or division of the clumps.

== Culinary use ==
Young leaves are high in vitamin C, slightly bitter, and can be eaten in salads or cooked. They are available in the winter months in temperate climates, when few other greens are available. The tender shoots of the plant during the spring-time, when cooked, are considered an excellent vegetable. The flower buds are eaten as well, and the flowers used for their spicy flavor and bright color. Additionally, the seeds of the plant can be sprouted and eaten in salads.

== Distribution ==
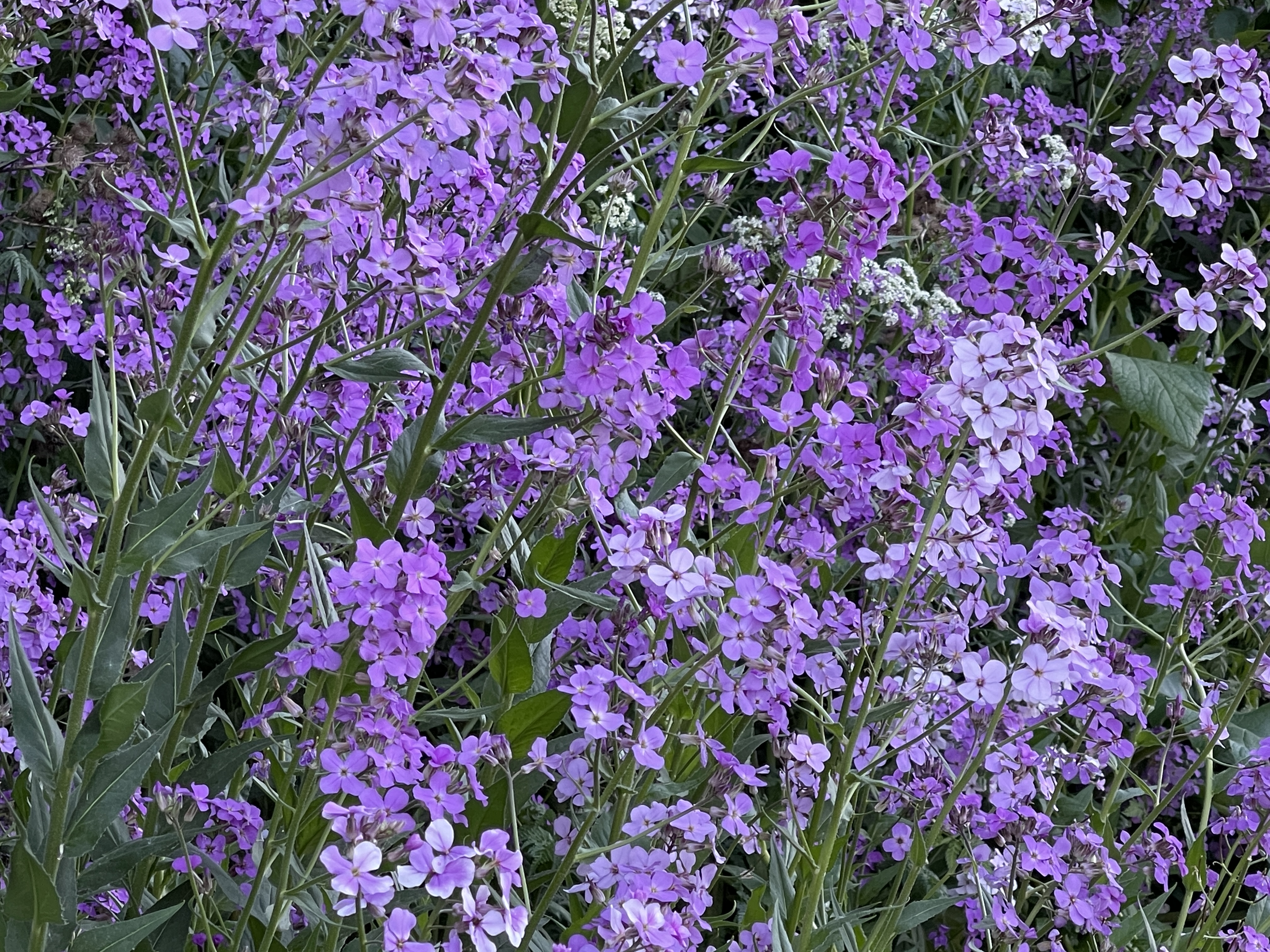
Deschambault-Grondines, Quebec, Canada

Hesperis matronalis is native to southern Europe from Spain to Turkey, and has been introduced to many other parts of the world with temperate climates. H. matronalis is found in many areas of Ireland, including Belfast, as a garden escape.

Dame's rocket was brought to North America in the 17th century and has since become naturalized there, now growing throughout most of the US and Canada. The US Department of Agriculture website has a map showing states and provinces in which the plant has been found.

In Europe, it is host to the caterpillars of several butterfly species, including the orange tip (Anthocharis cardamines), large white (Pieris brassicae), small white (Pieris rapae), and moths, such as Plutella porrectella.

== Weediness ==
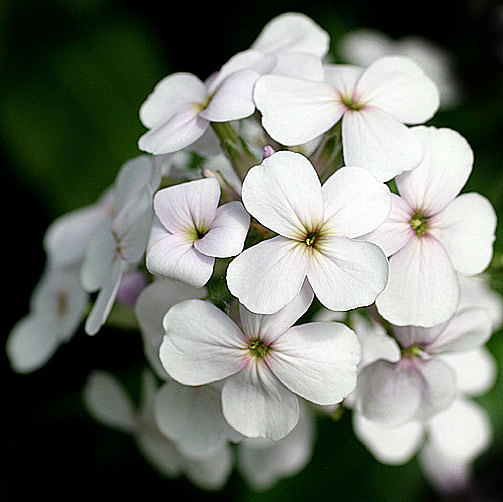
H. matronalis flower detail

It is considered an invasive species in some areas. Six U.S. states have placed legal restrictions on it:

- In Colorado, it is classed as a noxious weed (B-list), with plans for eradication or management varying by area and year.
- In Connecticut, it is classified as invasive and banned, making it illegal to move, sell, purchase, transplant, cultivate, or distribute the plant.
- In Massachusetts, it is prohibited.
- In New York, it is classified as invasive and eradication considered infeasible.
- In Wisconsin, it is classed as restricted, i.e. an invasive species that is already widely established in the state, and causes, or has the potential to cause significant environmental or economic harm.
- In Utah, it is listed as Class 4: Prohibited: Declared noxious and invasive weeds, not native to the state of Utah, that pose a threat to the state through the retail sale or propagation in the nursery and greenhouse industry. Designated as having the potential or are known to be detrimental to human or animal health, the environment, public roads, crops, or other property.

In Alberta, Canada, it is considered a noxious weed, meaning its growth or spread needs to be prevented.
