= Lilac Bush =

1889 painting by Vincent van Gogh

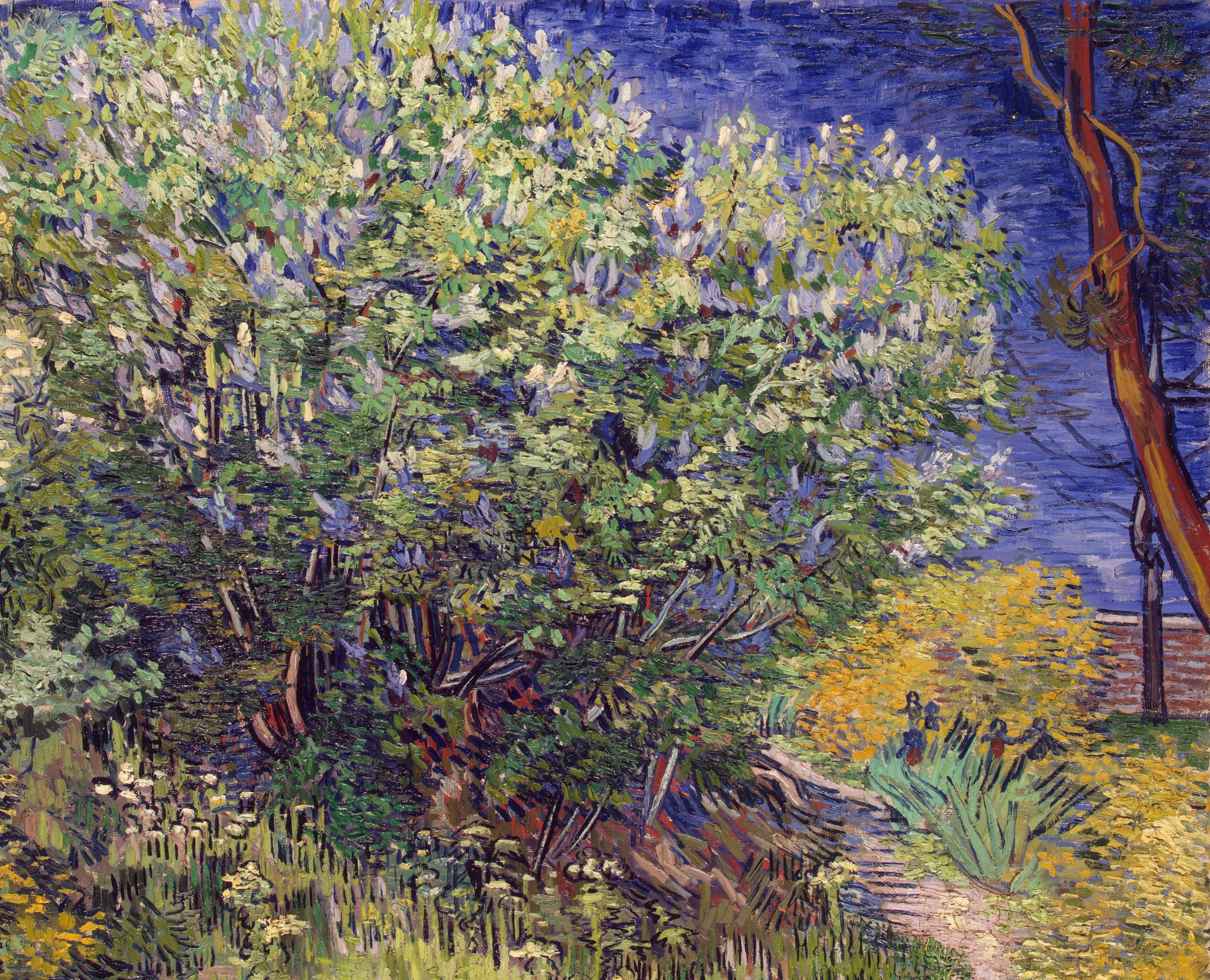
- Artist: Vincent van Gogh
- Year: May 1887
- Medium: Oil on canvas
- Dimensions: 73 cm × 92 cm (29 in × 36 in)
- Location: Hermitage Museum; Saint Petersburg

Lilac Bush (catalogue number : F 579, JH 1692) is a May 1889 oil on canvas painting by Vincent van Gogh, produced during his stay in Saint-Rémy. It is now in the Hermitage Museum. The artist began painting almost as soon as he had arrived at the psychiatric hospital of Saint-Paul de Mausole in Saint-Rémy. Among his first subjects were the irises and lilac bush in the hospital garden, mentioned in a letter written to his brother Theo and Theo's wife Johanna a few days after his arrival:

I have two other [paintings] to send - purple irises and a lilac bush. Two subjects taken from the garden.

== See also ==
- List of works by Vincent van Gogh
