= Puzieux, Moselle =

Puzieux
- Commune
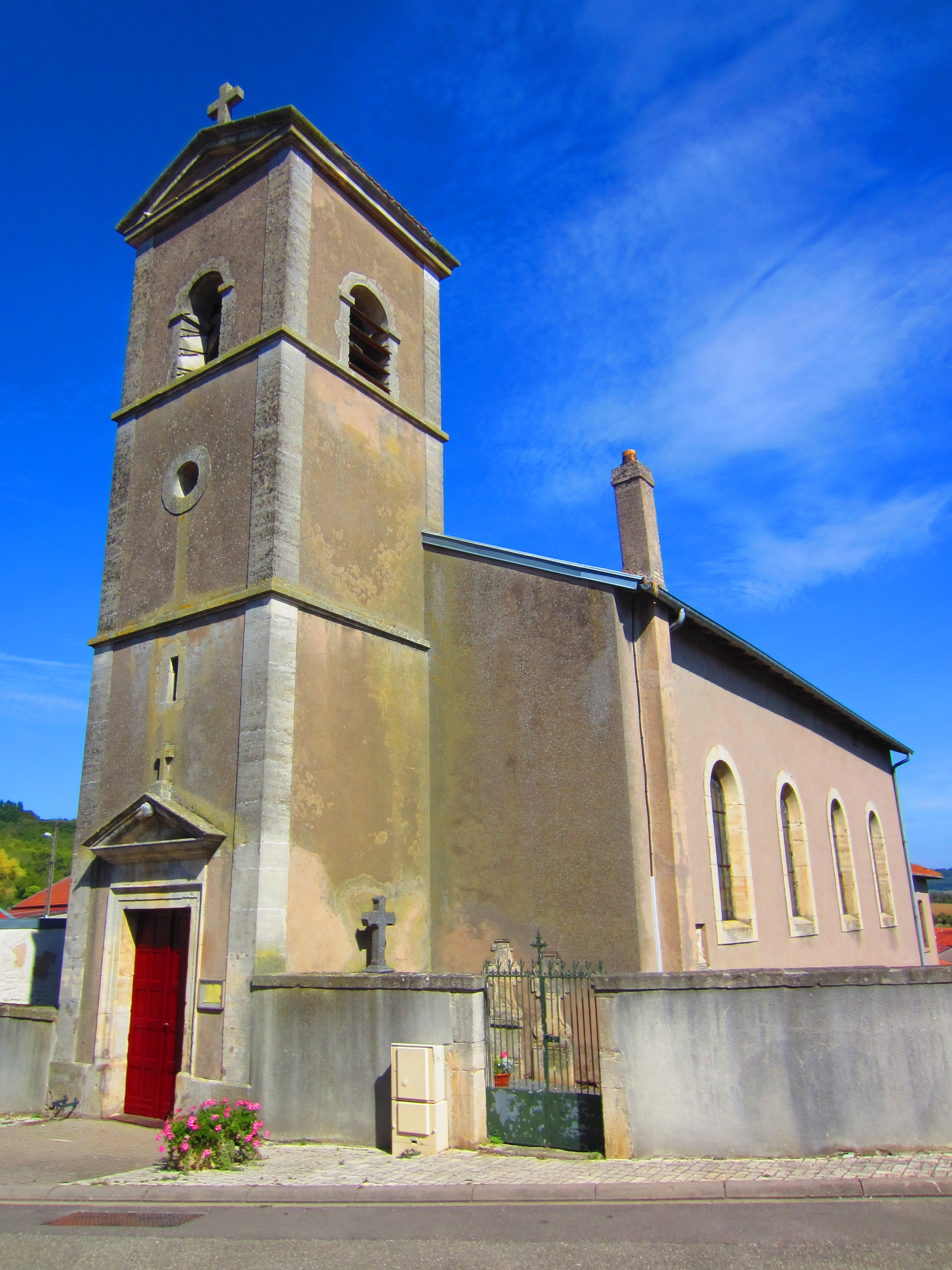
- The church in Puzieux

- Coat of arms
- Location of Puzieux
- Location within France Location within Grand Est
- Coordinates: 48°53′36″N 6°22′10″E
- Country: France
- Region: Grand Est
- Department: Moselle
- Arrondissement: Sarrebourg-Château-Salins
- Canton: Le Saulnois
- Intercommunality: CC du Saulnois

Government
  - Mayor (2020–2026): Gaëlle Quenette
- Area^{1}: 6.27 km^{2} (2.42 sq mi)
- Elevation: 260 m (850 ft)
- Highest elevation: 401 m (1,316 ft)
- Lowest elevation: 207 m (679 ft)
- Population (2023): 167
  - Density: 26.6/km^{2} (69.0/sq mi)
- Time zone: UTC+01:00 (CET)
  - Summer (DST): UTC+02:00 (CEST)
- INSEE/Postal code: 57559 /57590
- ^{1} French Land Register data, which excludes lakes, ponds, glaciers > 1 km^{2} (0.386 sq mi or 247 acres) and river estuaries.

Puzieux (French pronunciation: [pyzjø]; German: Püschingen) is a commune in the Moselle department in Grand Est in north-eastern France.

== See also ==
- Communes of the Moselle department
