= Statue of Frederick Douglass (Rochester, New York) =

Monument in Rochester, New York, U.S.

Monument of Frederick Douglass
- Frederick Douglass Monument
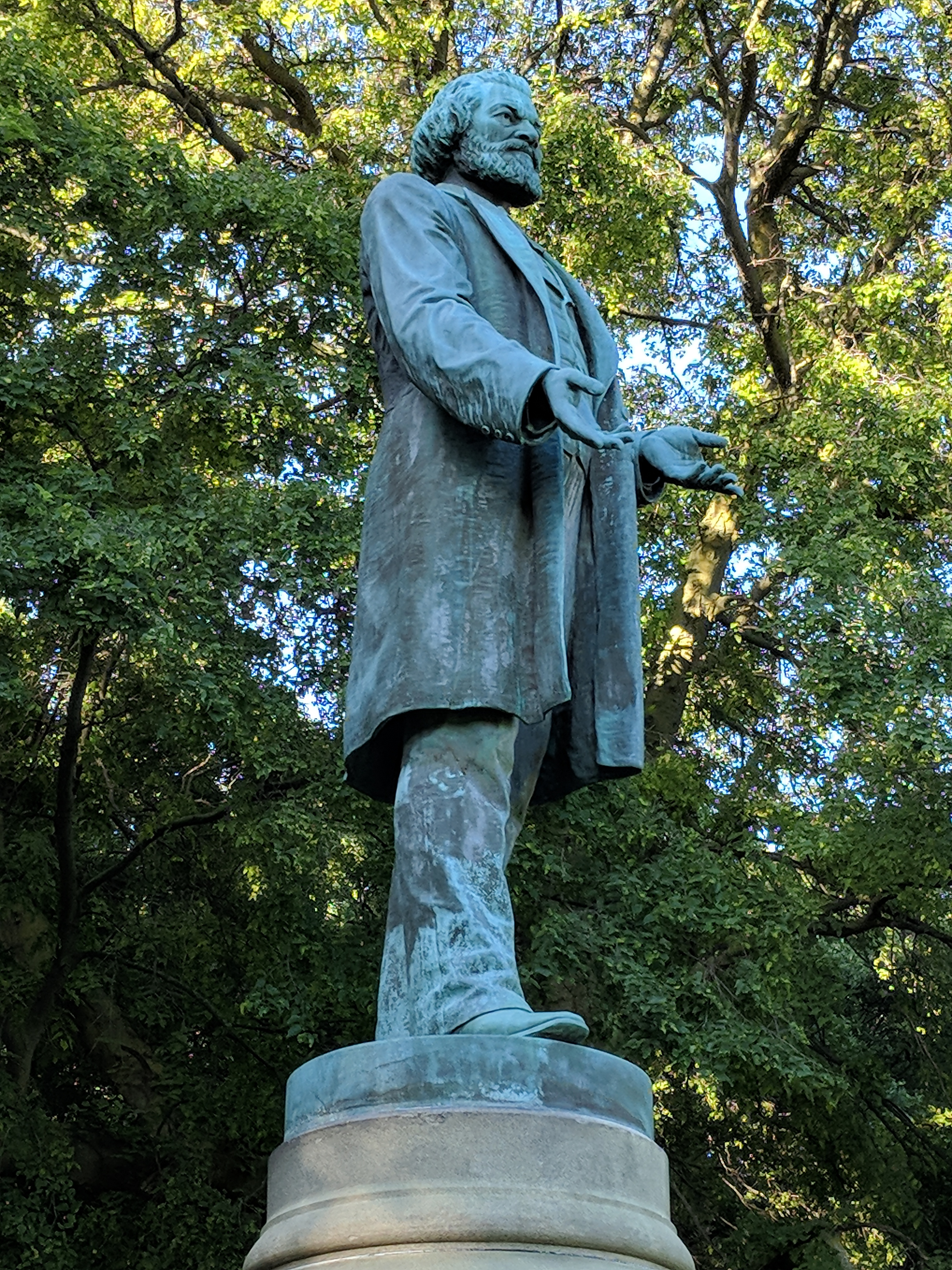
- The statue in 2018
- Artist: Stanley W. Edwards
- Year: 1899
- Medium: Bronze sculpture; granite (base)
- Subject: Frederick Douglass
- Location: Rochester, New York, U.S.; 43.133°N 77.608°W

A monument of Frederick Douglass sculpted by Stanley W. Edwards, sometimes called the Frederick Douglass Monument, was installed in Rochester, New York in 1899 after it was commissioned by the African-American activist John W. Thompson. According to Visualising Slavery: Art Across the African Diaspora, it was the first statue in the United States that memorialized a specific African-American person.

Originally located by the Rochester station, the monument was moved in 1941 to Highland Bowl, a natural amphitheater in Highland Park. The monument was relocated again in October 2019, becoming the centerpiece of a new Frederick Douglass Memorial Plaza. The base is surrounded by plaques bearing words from Douglass's speeches.

== Description ==
The full-length statue of Frederick Douglass is installed in Memorial Plaza, located several hundred yards from Douglass's former home on South Avenue. He has a beard and mustache, and wears a greatcoat, bow tie, and vest with a watch chain. His proper right foot is extended, and his arms are outstretched with his palms facing upward. The bronze sculpture is approximately 8 feet (2.4 m) tall and has a 30-inch (0.76 m) diameter. It rests on a cylindrical granite drum with four bronze plaques, which sits on an octagonal base atop a grey-tan granite block base that measures approximately 9 feet (2.7 m) by 66 inches (1.7 m).

The surrounding pillar sculptures represent Polaris (the North Star) and several constellations. The North Star was the anti-slavery newspaper published in Rochester by Douglass, named after the directions given to escaped slaves to follow Polaris north to freedom.

=== Inscriptions ===
The monument has several inscriptions. One of the rear of the base reads, "SMITH GRANITE CO. / WESTERLY, RI". Additionally, a plaque on the back of the base reads: "THE BEST DEFENCE OF FREE / AMERICAN INSTITUTIONS IS / THE HEARTS OF THE AMERICAN / PEOPLE THEMSELVES." / "ONE WITH GOD IS A MAJORITY" / "I KNOW OF NO RIGHTS OF RACE / SUPERIOR TO THE RIGHTS OF / HUMANITY."

A plaque on one of the sides of the base reads: "I KNOW OF NO SOIL BETTER / ADAPTED TO THE GROWTH OF / REFORM THAN AMERICAN SOIL / I KNOW OF NO COUNTRY. / WHERE THE CONDITIONS FOR / EFFECTING GREAT CHANGES / IN THE SETTLED ORDER OF / THINGS, FOR THE DEVELOPMENT / OF RIGHT IDEAS OF LIBERTY / AND HUMANITY ARE MORE / FAVORABLE THAN HERE IN / THESE UNITED STATES." / EXTRACT FROM SPEECH ON / DRED SCOTT DECISION, DELIVERED / IN NEW YORK, MAY 1857".

Another on the opposite side reads: "MEN DO NOT LIVE BY BREAD/ALONE; SO WITH NATIONS, THEY / ARE NOT SAVED BY ART, BUT BY / HONESTY; NOT BY THE GILDED / SPLENDORS OF WEALTH BUT BY / THE HIDDEN TREASURE OF / MANLY VIRTUE; NOT BY THE / MULTITUDINOUS GRATIFICATION / OF THE FLESH, BUT BY / THE CELESTIAL GUIDANCE / OF THE SPIRIT." / EXTRACT FROM THE SPEECH ON / THE WEST INDIA EMANCIPATION, / DELIVERED AT CANADAIGUA, N.Y. / AUGUST 4, 1857".

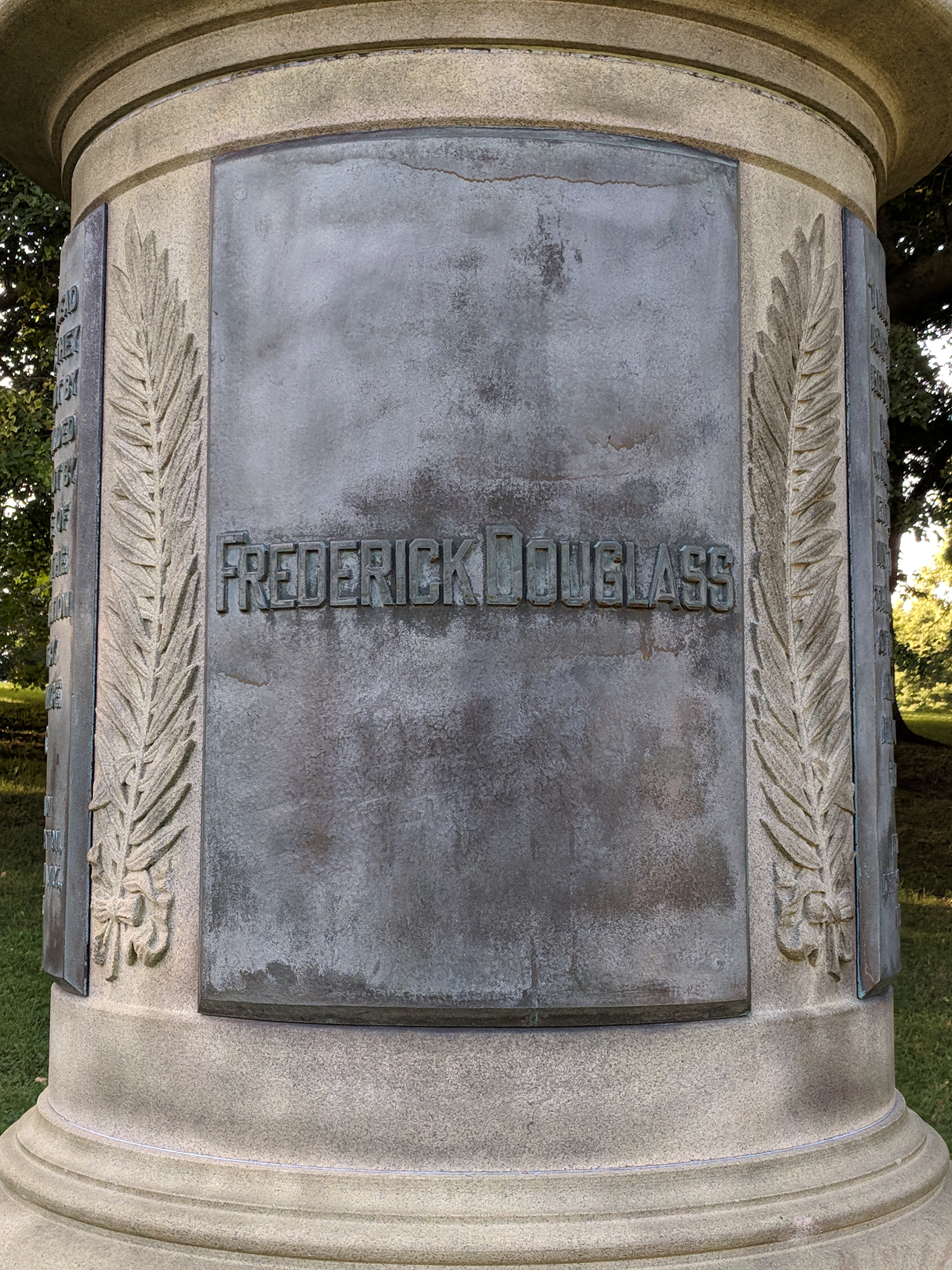
North side

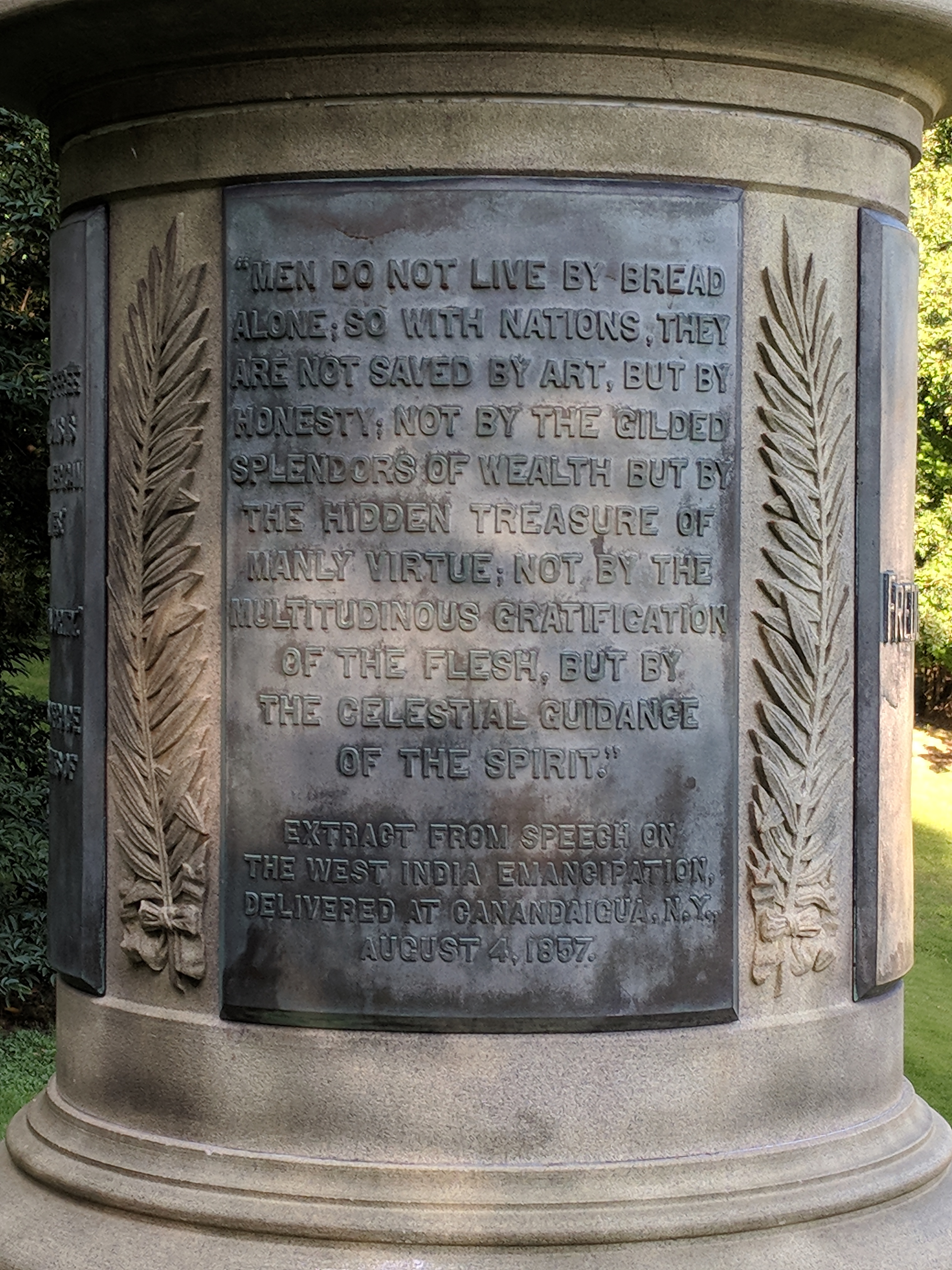
East side

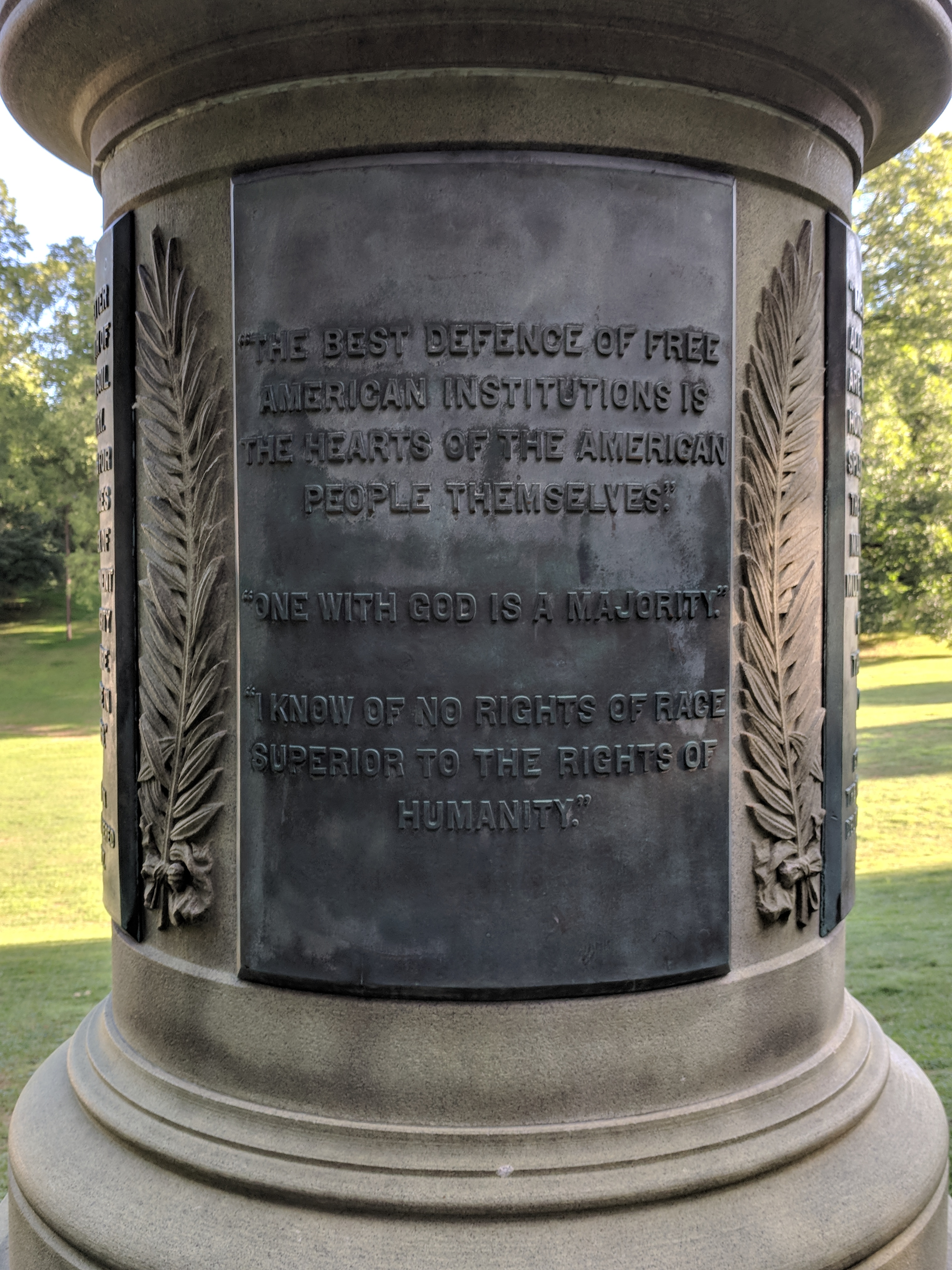
South side

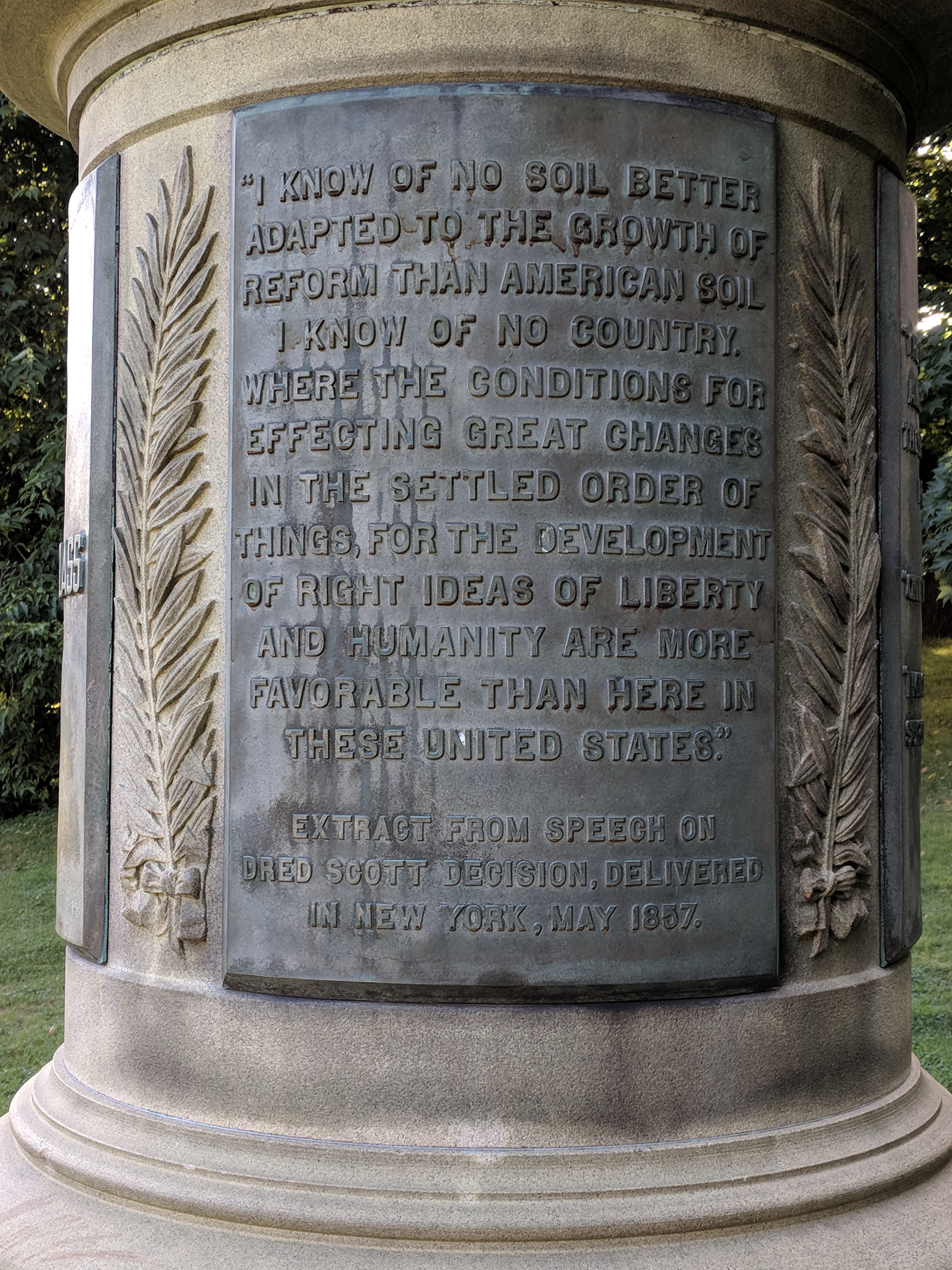
West side

== History ==
=== Creation and dedication ===
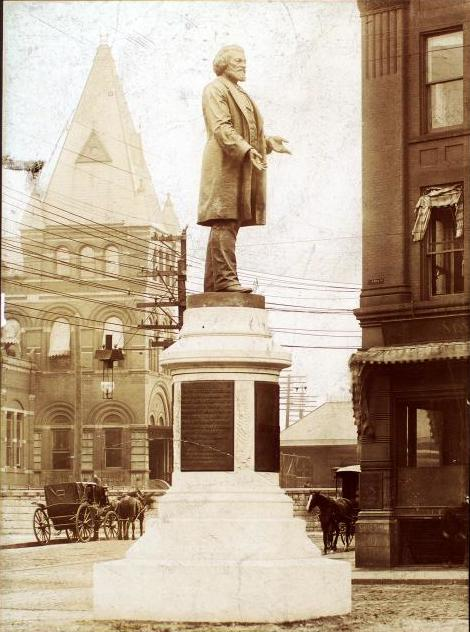
The statue in its original downtown location

In 1894, John W. Thompson, began organizing for a monument recognizing the African-American soldiers who had died in the Civil War. Thompson worked as a waiter at the Powers Hotel and was the leader of Eureka Lodge #36 of Free and Accepted Masons, a lodge with mostly Black members; the lodge was associated with Prince Hall Freemasonry, which largely did not admit non-white members. Thompson was prompted by the Soldiers and Sailors Monument; the monument, which was located in Washington Square Park, which did not depict any black figures.

The Eureka Lodge formed a committee to create a monument for the African-American soldiers and sailors who perished in the Civil War, but received little support. He then sent a letter to Douglass, who was then living in the Anacostia neighborhood of Washington, DC. Douglass replied in a supportive letter dated December 3, 1894: "I shall be proud to live to see the proposed monument erected in the city of Rochester, where the best years of my life were spent in the service of our people—and which to this day seems like my home." On December 21, appeals for funding for the monument were made in Rochester newspapers, but there was opposition from those who thought that the existing monument already represented all of the war dead. On December 22, a meeting held in the offices of state legislator Charles S. Baker decided to erect a shaft for the black war dead topped with a statue of Douglass.

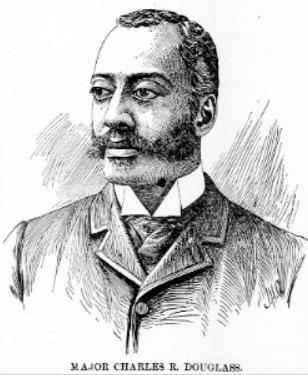
Frederick's son, Charles Remond Douglass, served as the model for the sculpture.

However, Douglass unexpectedly died on February 20, 1895. The next morning, Thompson announced in the local newspapers that the monument would be erected in Douglass's memory. Once funds were collected, sculptor Stanley Edwards began creating an 8-foot bronze statue, using Charles Remond Douglass, Frederick's son, as a model.

The location of the statue was controversial. The committee initially proposed located it in Plymouth Park in the Third Ward, in the middle of Rochester's black community. However, local residents opposed it and other city residents wanted a more central location. The final decision was to erect it by the New York Central train station. The initial unveiling was scheduled for September 14, 1898, but the organizers learned on September 12 that the statue was not ready. Regardless, almost 3,000 people gathered on September 14 to observe a ceremony in which the monument was formally turned over to the city. In his speech, Mayor George E. Warner said:

Our city is proud for having sheltered him when other cities would have refused him shelter. At his death she honored his remains and gave them a resting place at her door. To-day her citizens honor his memory by erecting a beautiful monument inscribed with his eloquent words. It is fitting that it should stand near a great portal of our city, where thousands who enter may see that she is willing to acknowledge to the world that her most illustrious citizen was not a white man.

Other speakers included abolitionist and suffragist Susan B. Anthony and Ida B. Wells, one of the founders of the National Association for the Advancement of Colored People (NAACP). The statue was unveiled on June 8, 1899, in front of ten thousand people. The day of the statue's unveiling was akin to a holiday for Rochester and included a parade which the military participated in. Then-Governor Theodore Roosevelt spoke at the unveiling.

=== Subsequent history and relocations ===
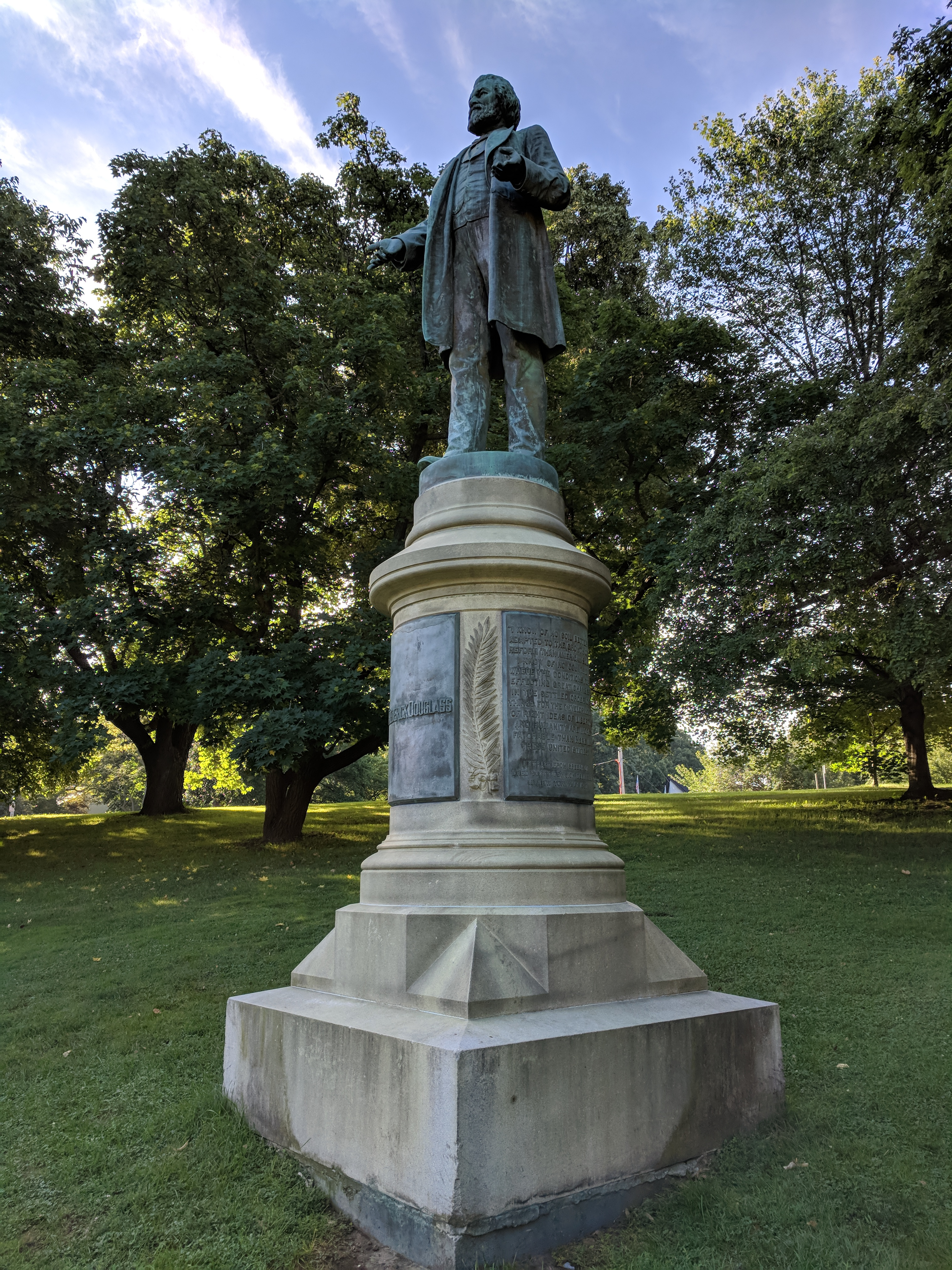
The statue in Highland Park, 2018

In 1941, the city decided to relocate the statue from the congested corner of St. Paul Street and Central Avenue to a quiet location overlooking the natural amphitheater at Highland Park.

The artwork was surveyed by the Smithsonian Institution's "Save Outdoor Sculpture!" program in 1994. It was co-administered by the City of Rochester and the Monroe County Parks Commission at the time.

In 2019, the statue was moved to Frederick Douglass Memorial Plaza, becoming the plaza's centerpiece. Rev. Julius D. Jackson, Jr of Trinity Emmanuel Presbyterian Church had begun advocating to move the statue for a visible location almost ten years earlier. A time capsule was found beneath the base of the statue in the process, but the contents, which seemed to be newspapers and books, were too badly damaged to be salvaged. The move was originally supposed to be completed for the bicentennial celebration in 2018, but was delayed due to issues with state funding and contract approval. The manager of the city's Douglass bicentennial project stated that the more prominent location was in accord with the original statue site: "Part of the reason it was put at the train station was because we were making a statement to people who were arriving that Frederick Douglass was an important person to us." She further stated that having the statue at the entryway to the Rochester Lilac Festival, the city's oldest and most famous festival, "lets visitors see how important the legacy of Frederick Douglass is."

== Douglass Bicentennial replicas ==
There was a wide variety of events and commemorations in 2018 for the 200th birthday of Douglass. Of the three major initiatives, one focused on moving the original statue and erecting a series of life sized replicas of the statue through the city as part of a "history trail." The project leader stated, "We wanted to take the legend of Frederick Douglass off the pedestal and bring it to the streets of Rochester where he walked. The legacy piece is well taken care of. ... What we're into is, what does Frederick Douglass mean today, locally and as far as our national conversation?" The 13 new statues were made by sculptor Olivia Kim by layering epoxy and fiberglass, based on 80 measurements made of the Stanley W. Edwards statue. However, Kim modified the sculpture to reduce the stern posture of the original. She stated, "You can see when he's much older, he has genuine relaxation and happiness in his face, which is something you never see before. His life was about enormous struggle, but also about finding a way through." The hands of the replicas were made from casts of Kenneth B. Morris, Jr.'s hands. Morris is the great-great-great-grandson of Douglass and the Co-Founder and President of Frederick Douglass Family Initiatives. The statues were placed in locations important to Douglass's legacy:

- Aqueduct Park, next to the Talman Building from which The North Star and The Frederick Douglass Newspaper were published
- The former site of the AME Zion Church where The North Star was originally published, and a stop on the Underground Railroad
- The former site of the Douglass Family farm
- The building formerly the Central Presbyterian Church, the site of Douglass's funeral
- Original location of the Douglass statue in 1899
- The site of Douglass's famous "What to the Slave Is the Fourth of July?" speech
- Douglass's first home
- The site of the Seward School that was attended by Douglass's children
- Kelsey's Landing in Maplewood Park, an Underground Railroad departure point
- Mount Hope Cemetery, where Douglass and members of his family are buried
- Soldiers' and Sailors' Monument located in Washington Square Park, which prompted the initial idea for the statue
- University of Rochester's Rush Rhees Library with information on Douglass's work in Rochester
- SUNY Rochester Educational Opportunity Center, The College at Brockport, State University of New York display on Douglass's commitment to education

=== Vandalism ===
Shortly after installation, two students from St. John Fisher College were arrested for severe damage to the replica at the site of the Seward School. The college suspended the students amid widespread community outrage. One of the students stated, "Me and my friend were extremely drunk, and for some reason thought it was a good idea to try and take a statue. It had nothing to do with the identity of the statue whatsoever like everyone thinks." However, one witness stated he heard them yell racial epithets.

In June 2020, the replica in Maplewood Park was removed from its base. The statue was found in a nearby gorge, in a damaged condition. Carvin Eison, project director of Re-Energize the Legacy of Frederick Douglass Committee in Rochester, stated that it would be replaced with another replica in storage. Eison said, "I’ve always said if one goes down ten more go back up." The police opened an investigation. President Donald Trump blamed the vandalism on anarchists, while former NAACP president Cornell William Brooks stated his belief that it was done in retaliation for Confederate statues removed in the wake of the George Floyd protests. Ten days later, it was replaced with the spontaneous help of the two men who had vandalized the Seward School site two years before as their way of taking "a step in the right direction."

A third statue, this time in Aqueduct Park, was knocked off its pedestal in September 2021. It was replaced with another statue on Oct. 20, 2021.

== See also ==
- List of monuments and memorials removed during the George Floyd protests
