= Lilac Festival =

Lilac Festival is the name of various festivals which celebrate the Lilac (Syringa).

== Canada ==
- Lilac Festival (Calgary) - since 1989 in Calgary, Alberta, Canada
- Lilac Festival (Franktown) - since 1995 in the Lilac Capital of Ontario, Franktown, Ontario, Canada

== United States ==
- Lilac Festival (Rochester) - since 1898 in Rochester, New York
- Lilac Festival (Spokane) - since 1938 in Spokane, Washington
- Lilac Festival (Mackinac Island) - since 1949 on Mackinac Island, Michigan
- Lilac Festival (Lombard, Illinois) - since 1929 in Lombard, Illinois, known as The Lilac Village. Its "Lilacia Park", landscaped by Jens Jensen, features 1,200 lilacs on 3.4 hectares. Every May since 1929, Lombard has hosted Lilac Time featuring a number of events for lilac enthusiasts.
