= Maplewood Park =

- Seneca Park East and West
- U.S. National Register of Historic Places
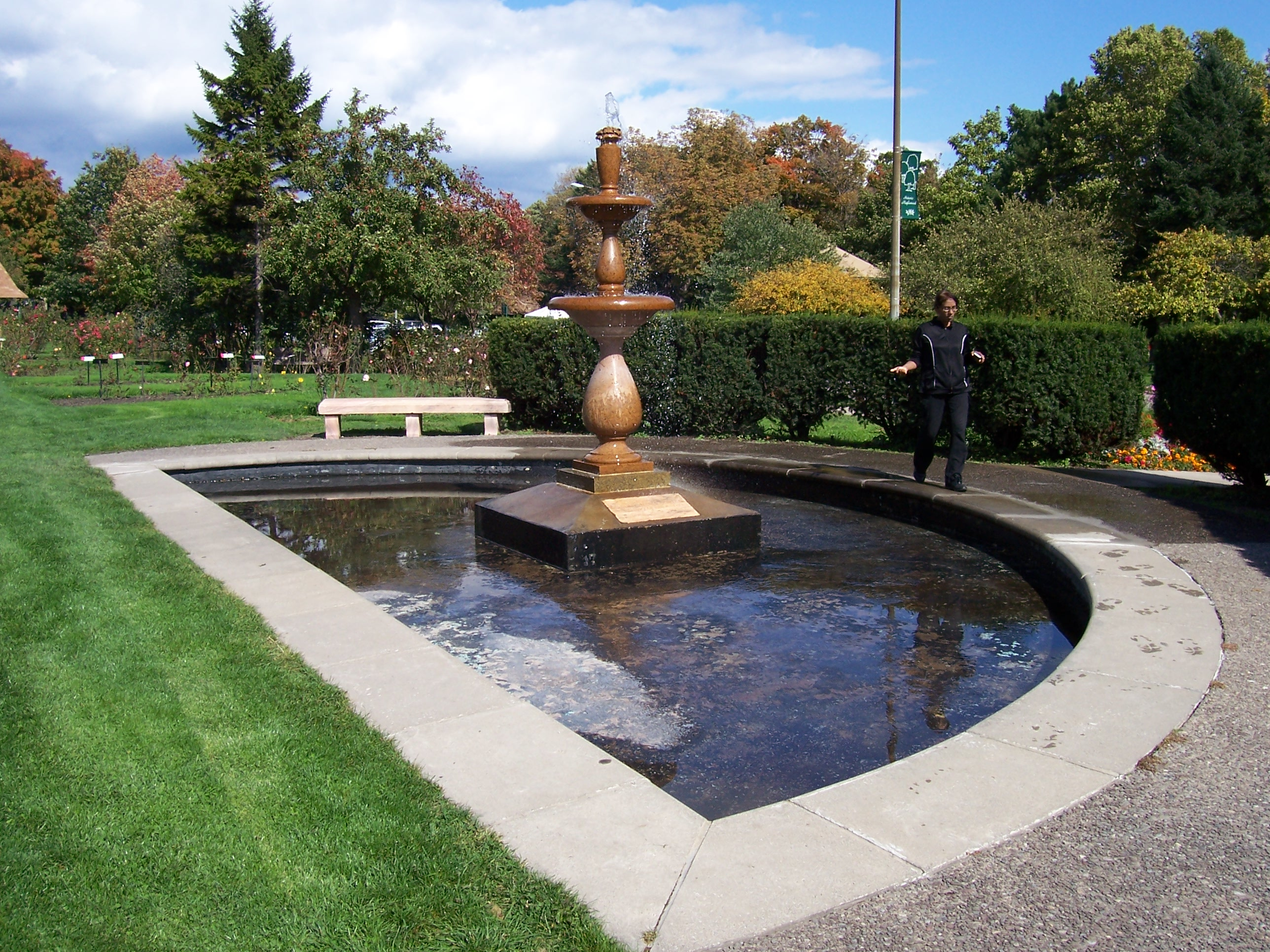

- Location within New York Location within the United States
- Location: Saint Paul Blvd., Maplewood Dr, Lake Ave., Rochester, New York
- Coordinates: 43°11′46″N 77°37′31″W
- Area: 300 acres (120 ha)
- Built: 1888
- Architect: Olmsted, Frederick Law Sr.; Olmsted, John C.
- Architectural style: Moderne, Arts and Crafts
- MPS: Municipal Park System of Rochester, New York MPS
- NRHP reference No.: 03000969
- Added to NRHP: September 26, 2003

Maplewood Park, also known as Seneca Park West, is a landscaped public park in Rochester, New York, situated between Lake Avenue and the Genesee River. The two-mile-long (3.2 km) park features many trails along the river gorge and the river bank below, scenic views of two waterfalls and a nationally accredited Rose Garden.

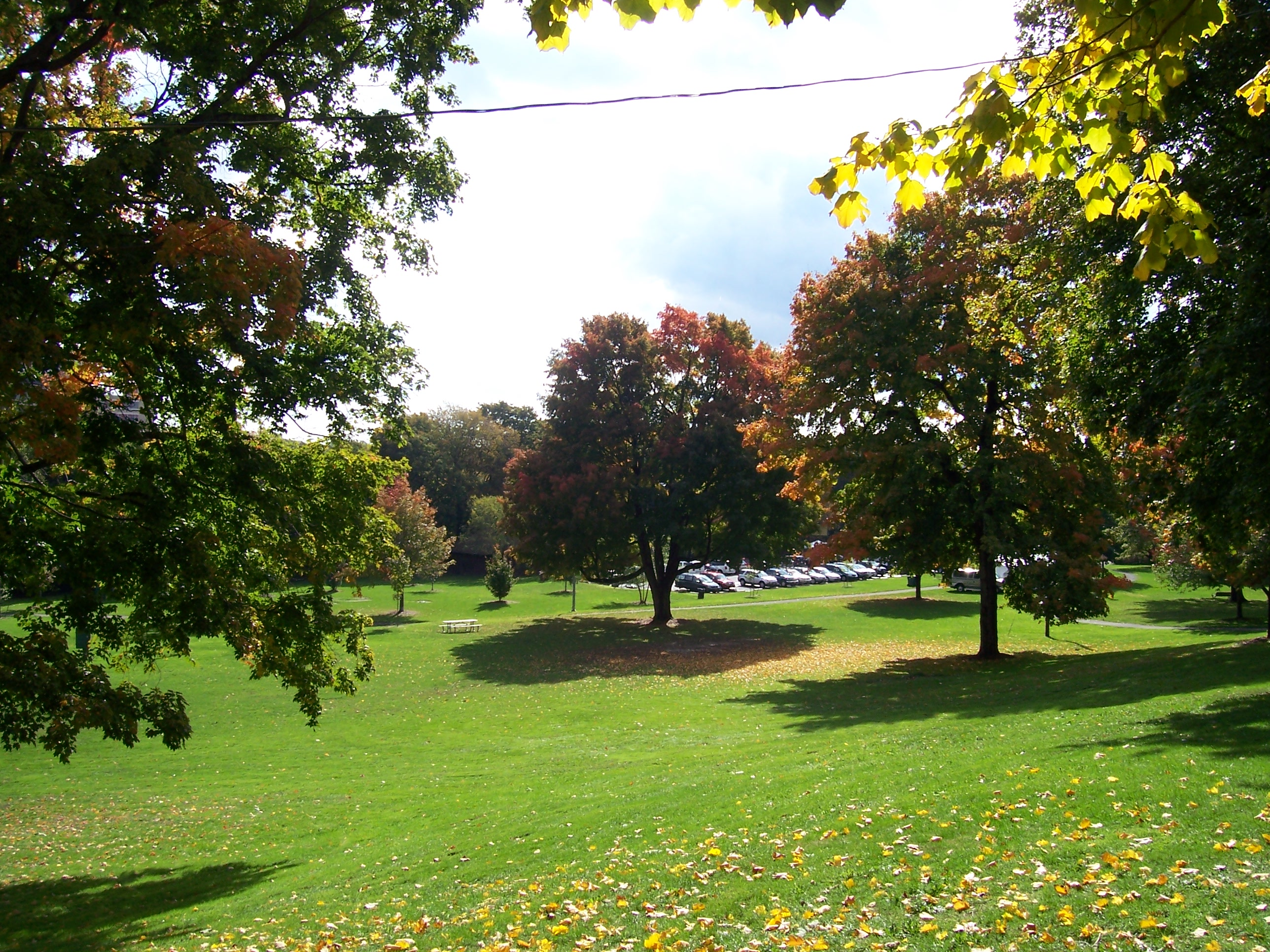
View from northwest corner of the park

The park was laid out by landscape architect Frederick Law Olmsted, who also designed nearby Highland Park, Genesee Valley Park, and Seneca Park, which is now a zoo.

It was listed on the National Register of Historic Places in 2003.

== Frederick Douglass statue ==
A statue of former slave and renowned Underground Railroad conductor Frederick Douglass which was located in Maplewood Park was vandalized and torn down over the weekend of July 4, 2020. The site of the present-day park was located along the Underground Railroad where Douglas and Harriet Tubman helped shuttle slaves to freedom. The statue is a replica of statue of Frederick Douglass in Rochester, New York. Removal also occurred on the anniversary of Douglas' famous 1852 anti-slavery speech at this location.
