= Ellwanger Garden =

Historical garden in Rochester, New York, USA

Coordinates: 43.1377°N 77.6151°W

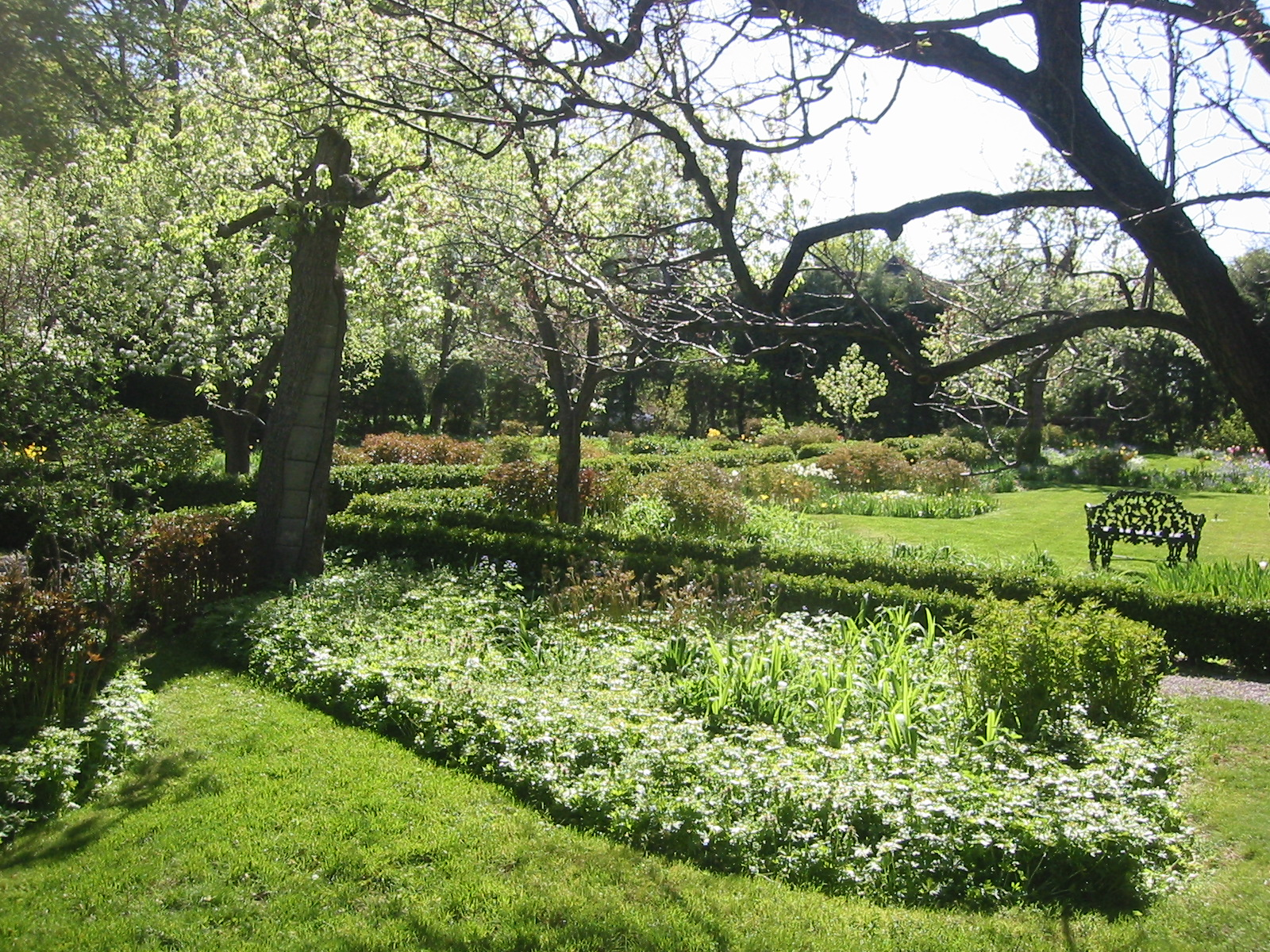
- Interactive map of Ellwanger Garden

Ellwanger Garden (0.5 acres) is a historical garden located at 625 Mt. Hope Avenue, Rochester, New York. It is open only during the Lilac Festival (May), Peony Weekend (June), and by appointment, according to its web page.

The garden was planted in 1867 for the residential grounds of George Ellwanger, noted 19th-century nurseryman, who also gave Rochester's fine Highland Park to the city. It was maintained for 115 years by the Ellwanger family.

Since 1982, it has been owned and maintained as an historic landscape by the Landmark Society of Western New York, and the garden opened to the public in 1986. It features perennials, trees, and shrubs, with elements of Fletcher Steele garden design incorporated in the 1920s and 1930s.

== See also ==
- Highland Park, Rochester, New York
- List of botanical gardens in the United States
