= George Francis Roth =

Rochester businessman (1856–1927)

George Francis Roth (1856–1927) was a successful Rochester businessman, public figure, and philanthropist. He served, for a time, on the Board of City Assessors; and was, later, appointed Collector at the Rochester port of Charlotte. He served there two terms, including the years when the Charlotte to Cobourg train-car ferries began operation. He was married, with no children.

== Family ==
George F. Roth was born in Rochester, N.Y., in September 1856, to German-born parents Frederick and Frederica Roth. He had two older siblings, Amelia and Julia Roth, and attended public schools and high school in Rochester.

He married Christine Klaile in 1889. Her parents, like George's, were both born in Germany.

== Business career ==
Roth was already working, as a grocery clerk, when he was just 13 years old and still in school. After high school, he entered the lumber business, first in Rochester, then for eight years in Denver.

By 1889, back in Rochester, he had bought into the Hilbert Truck Company. That company, which was later renamed the Rochester Carting Company, was hired in 1892 to install the large soldier's monument in Rochester's Washington Square. Roth became, by 1900, the firm's vice president and manager.

His company started to branch into renting storage facilities, which led in 1924 to a spin-off business: “Rochester Storage Warehouse”. They offered fireproof space in a new building, which could store belongings, furniture and valuables like carpets, pianos, automobiles, and so on. At the time of his passing, in 1927, Roth was President of both the Rochester Carting Company and the Rochester Storage Warehouse.

His other business interests included becoming, in 1905, a director of the Rochester Electric Railway Company, which owned a trolley line from Rochester to Charlotte, Rochester's port community.

Before that, in 1895, Roth was one of the investors and directors of a new firm, the Rochester Cash Register Company. Nonetheless, the firm went into receivership in 1899, and its patents were sold to the National Cash Register Company. Legal notice to dissolve Roth's company was posted in 1900.

Like many executives of his level, Roth was active over the years in various committees of his city's Chamber of Commerce. One example was serving, in 1903, as a vice-president of its board of trustees.

== Community Service and Politics ==
George Francis Roth was well known in Rochester for his active involvement in social and philanthropic organizations. These included, among numerous others: The Rochester Club, the Rod and Gun Club, the Masonic Order, the Elks; the Rochester Yacht Club, and as Trustee of the Salem Evangelical Church.

Proud of his German roots, Roth was a leader in fundraising efforts for building a German hospital in an underserved part of the city. He was also a long-time supporter of the German Home for the Aged in Rochester.

Roth was, politically, a Republican, who played various roles. For example, in 1900, he was elected as his ward's representative to a convention tasked to select congressional-district delegates to the Republican national convention. In October that year, he attended a “triumphal welcome” to Rochester for Theodore Roosevelt, then the Governor; and Roth was listed among numerous “vice presidents” for the Republican Party. After Governor-elect Benjamin Odell was elected that fall, he appointed Roth as a personal aide with the rank of captain.

Benefitting from his efforts and Republican connections, Roth obtained over the years some patronage appointments. Around 1895, he was the party's choice for City Assessor. In 1903, he was appointed and confirmed by the senate as the Genesee Port Collector, and Custodian of the Government Buildings in Rochester. As Custodian, he invited proposal bids for repair work and safety improvements on, for example, the court house and post office.

Roth's first term as Port Collector overlapped the establishment, in 1905, and the beginning of operation, in 1907, of the train-car ferry between Rochester's port and Cobourg, Ontario. The ferry was a joint operation of the Buffalo, Rochester, and Pittsburgh Railway and Canada's Grand Trunk Railway. This impacted Roth's work at the port, due to a great increase in port business; and also, because the ice-breaking ferry ran year-round, so his office had to remain open in winter months.

George Roth died suddenly of heart disease in 1927 when visiting friends. He had retired from his patronage appointments but was still President of his carting and warehouse businesses.
