= Genesee Valley Park =

Park in Rochester, Monroe County, United States of America

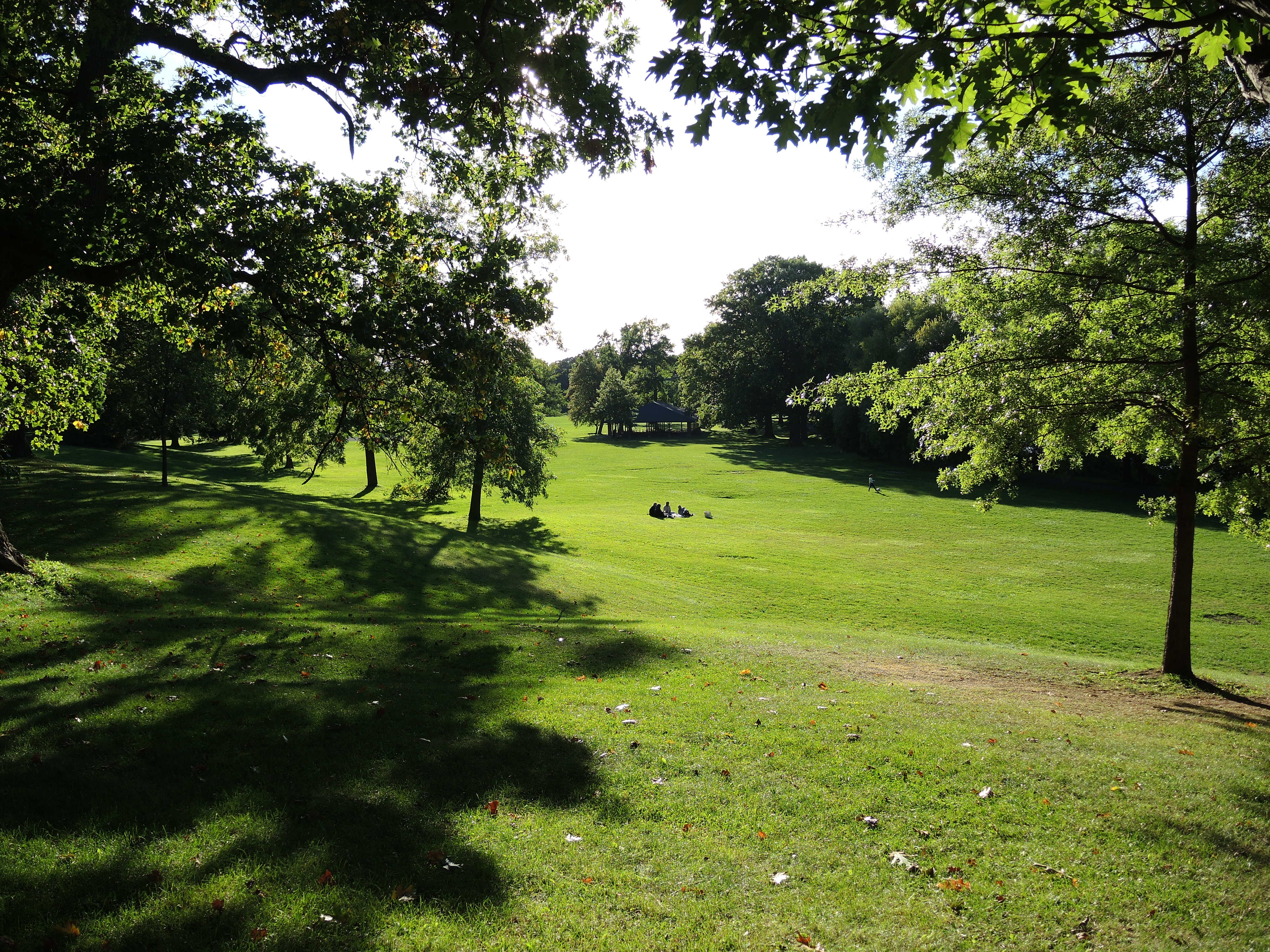
- Genesee Valley Park's picnic area

- Location within New York
- Type: Regional park
- Location: South side of Rochester, New York
- Coordinates: 43°06′48″N 77°39′09″W
- Area: 800 acres (3.2 km^{2})
- Created: 1888
- Operator: Monroe County Parks Department

Genesee Valley Park, originally named "South Park", is located in the south side of Rochester, New York along the shores of the Genesee River. The New York State Barge Canal (the currently in-use portion of the Erie Canal) crosses the Genesee River within the park. The University of Rochester is located near the park's north entrance.

== History ==
The park was formed from land first acquired by the Park Commission in 1888. Genesee Valley Park is among the many parks in New York state designed by Frederick Law Olmsted. Within Rochester, other Frederick Law Olmsted parks include Highland Park, Maplewood Park, and Seneca Park, which is now a zoo.

Olmsted had originally designed the east and west sides of the park to have different purposes. The east side was intended to provide the feeling of a large pasture while the west side was for more recreational activities. At Olmsted's suggestion, a flock of 80 sheep was introduced into the park in 1893, which added to the pastoral sense of the park and also helped to keep the grass trimmed.

In 1917, the golf course was expanded from 9 to 18 holes. The Barge (Erie) Canal was merged with Genesee River within the park on May 10, 1918.

With the opening of Genesee Expressway (now part of Interstate 390), the park was bisected straining the original pastoral atmosphere.

== Features ==
Genesee Valley Park covers 800 acres (3.2 km^{2}) and features two public golf courses and a recreational area. The park has four foot bridges crossing the Genesee River and Erie Canal, and is located at the intersection of the Genesee Valley Greenway trail and the Erie Canal towpath trail, which stretches across New York State.
