= Mission, Calgary =

Mission
- Neighbourhood
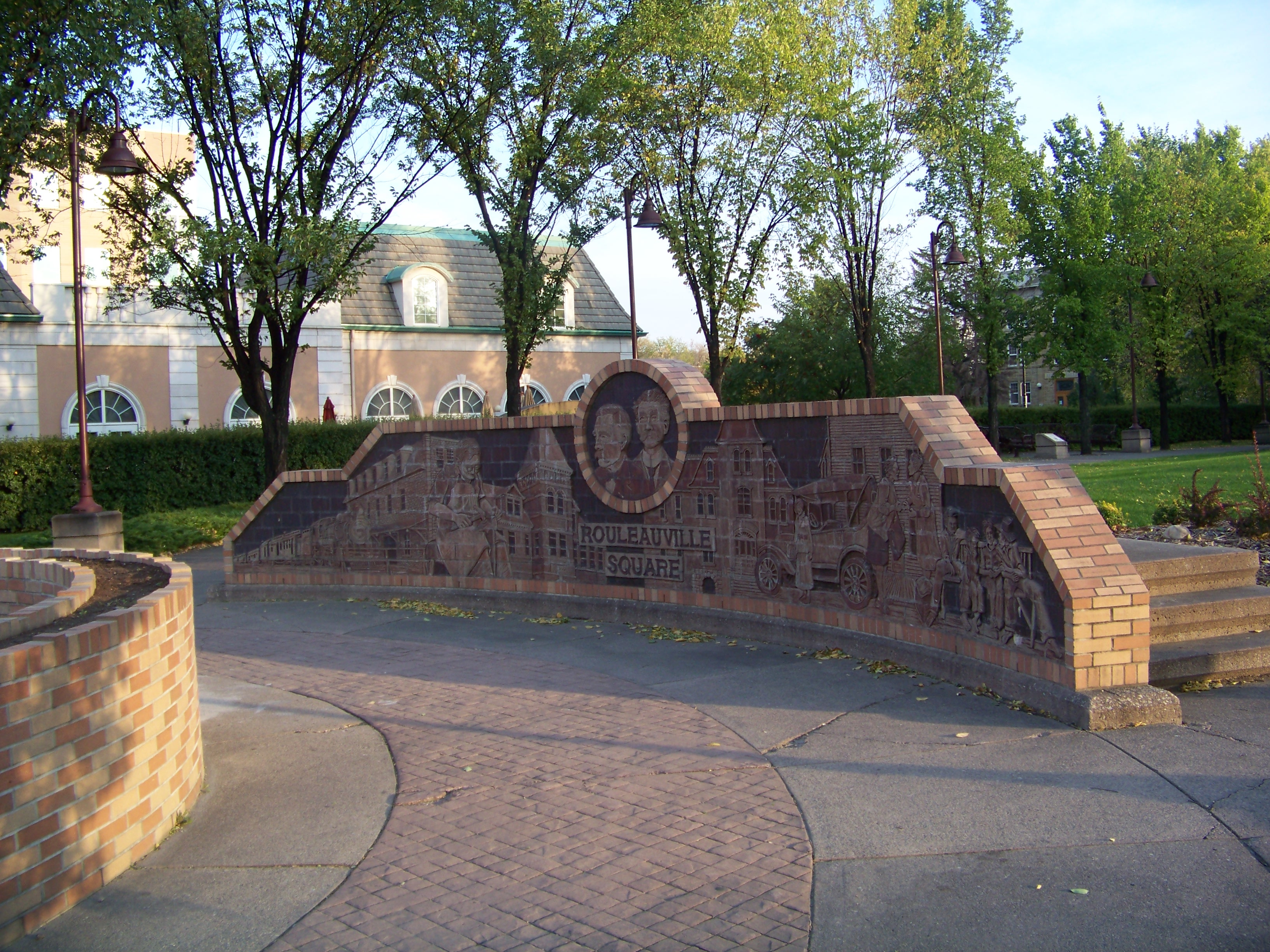
- Rouleauville Square in the Mission district

- Location of Mission in Calgary
- Coordinates: 51°01′55″N 114°04′12″W
- Country: Canada
- Province: Alberta
- City: Calgary
- Quadrant: SW
- Ward: 8
- Established: 1899
- Annexed: 1907

Government
  - Mayor: Jeromy Farkas
  - Administrative body: Calgary City Council
  - Councillor: Nathaniel Schmidt (Independent)

Area
  - Total: 0.53 km^{2} (0.20 sq mi)
- Elevation: 1,050 m (3,440 ft)

Population (2006)
  - Total: 4,433
  - Density: 8,364.2/km^{2} (21,663/sq mi)
  - Average Income: $37,040
- Website: Mission Community Association

The Mission district is an inner city neighbourhood of Calgary, Alberta, Canada, that originated as Notre Dame de la Paix, a Catholic mission and was for a time the incorporated Village of Rouleauville. Mission is bordered by 4th Street SW with restaurants and shops, and it hosts the Lilac Festival in June.

It is represented in the Calgary City Council by the Ward 8 councillor. The community has an area redevelopment plan in place.

== History ==
After a temporary location 40 km (25 mi) away (started in 1872), Oblate missionary Father Constantine Scollen, on behalf of the Roman Catholic Church, founded the permanent location in 1875. In 1883, Oblate missionary Father Albert Lacombe, returning after a ten-year absence, obtained two quarter sections of land for a "Mission district" to ensure a strong French-speaking Catholic community. Father Scollen, who had lived in the area since 1862 and who had witnessed Treaty Six with the Cree nations and Treaty Seven with the Blackfoot Confederacy, left for Edmonton and then the United States.

The area was incorporated as the Village of Rouleauville on November 2, 1899. Named after Charles Rouleau, the village was founded in what was then the District of Alberta in the North-West Territories. Despite Lacombe's desire to preserve the French language and culture, Rouleauville progressively lost its French character, becoming overwhelmingly English. In 1907, the village was annexed by Calgary. In the process all the French names of streets were replaced by Calgary's street numbering system.

Mission is one of many Calgary neighbourhoods impacted by flood events. In 1929, the area was submerged when the Bow River overran its banks. The area was again impacted by floods in June 2013. An evacuation was ordered on June 20 for a minimum of 72 hours.

=== Institutions ===
In the latter part of his life, Lacombe helped found a number of Catholic schools throughout the West, including St. Mary's School in 1885, initially using a two-storey log cabin convent in Mission district (Rouleauville). It is now the oldest school still operating in Calgary (though in a newer building).

In 1889 St. Mary's Church was founded, and in 1912 it became St. Mary's Cathedral when it became the seat of the newly formed Diocese of Calgary.

== Demographics ==
In the City of Calgary's 2012 municipal census, Mission had a population of 4,325 living in 3,177 dwellings--a 0.9% decrease from its 2011 population of 4,363. With a land area of 0.5 km^{2} (0.19 sq mi), it had a population density of 8,700/km^{2} (22,400/sq mi) in 2012.

Residents in this community had a median household income of $37,040 in 2000, and there were 25% low income residents living in the neighbourhood. As of 2000, 20.1% of the residents were immigrants.

== Crime ==
Crime Data
Year	Crime Rate (/100 pop.)
2018	6.0
2019	7.4
2020	6.5
2021	3.4
2022	3.0
2023	3.2

== See also ==
- List of former urban municipalities in Alberta
- St. Mary's Parish Hall
