= Lilac Festival (Mackinac Island) =

Annual flower festival in Michigan, US

- Status: active
- Genre: festivals
- Frequency: Annually
- Location: Mackinac Island
- Coordinates: 45°50′57″N 84°37′08″W
- Country: United States
- Years active: 76–77
- Inaugurated: 1949
- Website: www.mackinacisland.org/mackinac-island-lilac-festival-3/

The Lilac Festival is a ten-day annual festival held in honor of the common lilac at Mackinac Island in the U.S. state of Michigan. The festival, which has been held since 1949, begins on the second Friday of June and concludes, on the third Sunday of June, with the horse-drawn Lilac Parade.

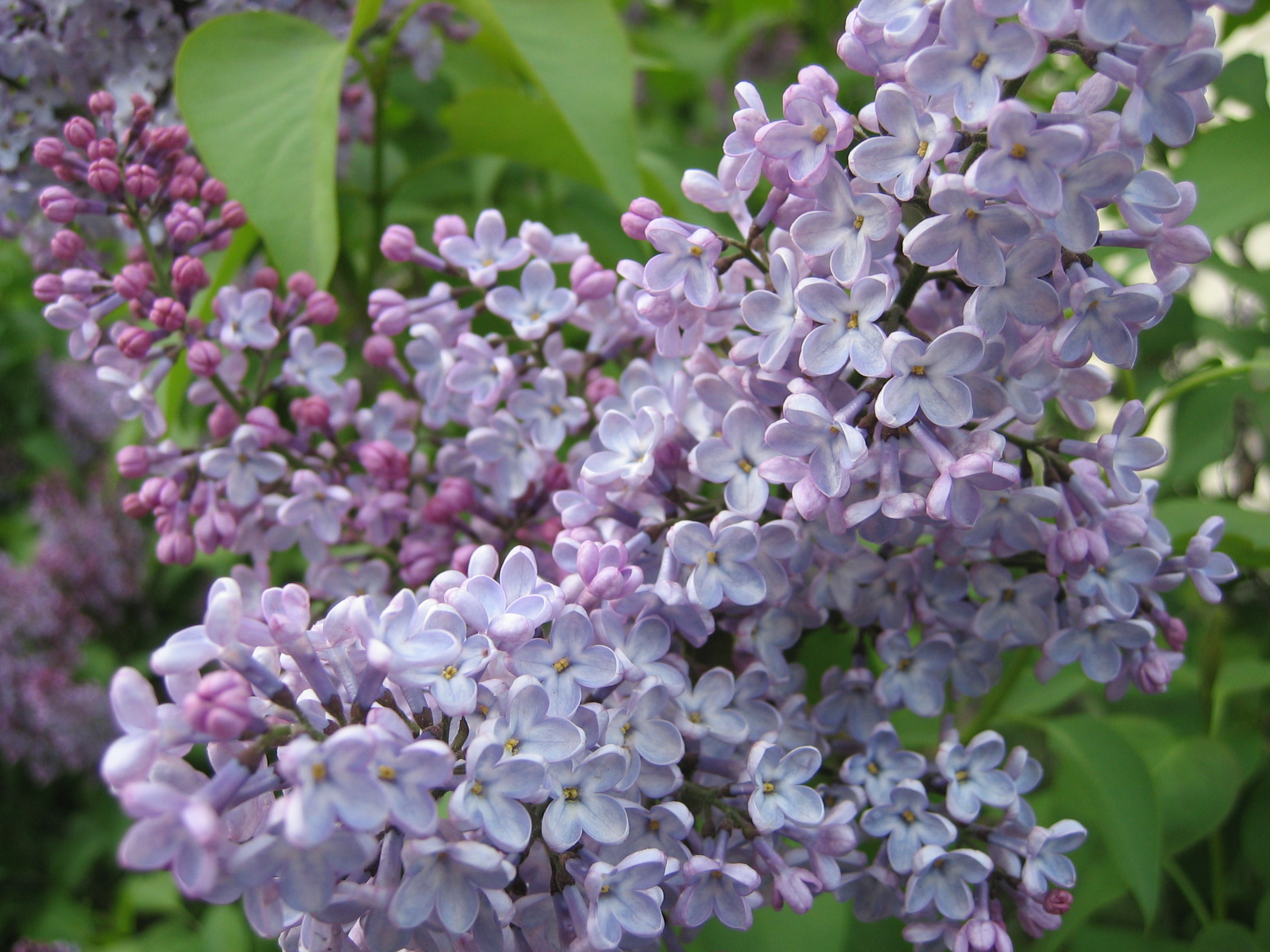
Lilac flowers are the symbol of the Festival

== History ==
Americans began widespread planting of the common lilac during the Victorian Age, and Mackinac Islanders soon found that the island's microclimate makes it a healthy location for the common lilac to grow to a larger size and longer life than in most gardens of the United States. Some Mackinac Island lilac trees are original Victorian plantings, dated at more than 150 years old.

Most events were cancelled in 2020 because of the COVID-19 pandemic, but some were held online.

== Today ==
The festival is timed to try to coincide with the week that Mackinac Island lilacs are in bloom, and bunches of white and purple lilac flowerets are used by organizers as the visual symbol of the festival.

As no private motor vehicles are allowed on Mackinac Island, the floats of the Lilac Parade are all drawn by draft horses such as Clydesdales and Percherons. The festival procession is one of the few remaining horse-drawn parades in the United States.

The festival was founded by the year-round residents of Mackinac Island, especially Stella King and Evangeline "Ling" Horn. The festival has been recognized as a "Local Legacy" event by the American Folklife Center of the Library of Congress.

== See also ==
- Lilac Festival (Calgary)
- Lilac Festival (New York)
