= Lilac Festival (Calgary) =

Annual street festival in Calgary, Alberta, Canada

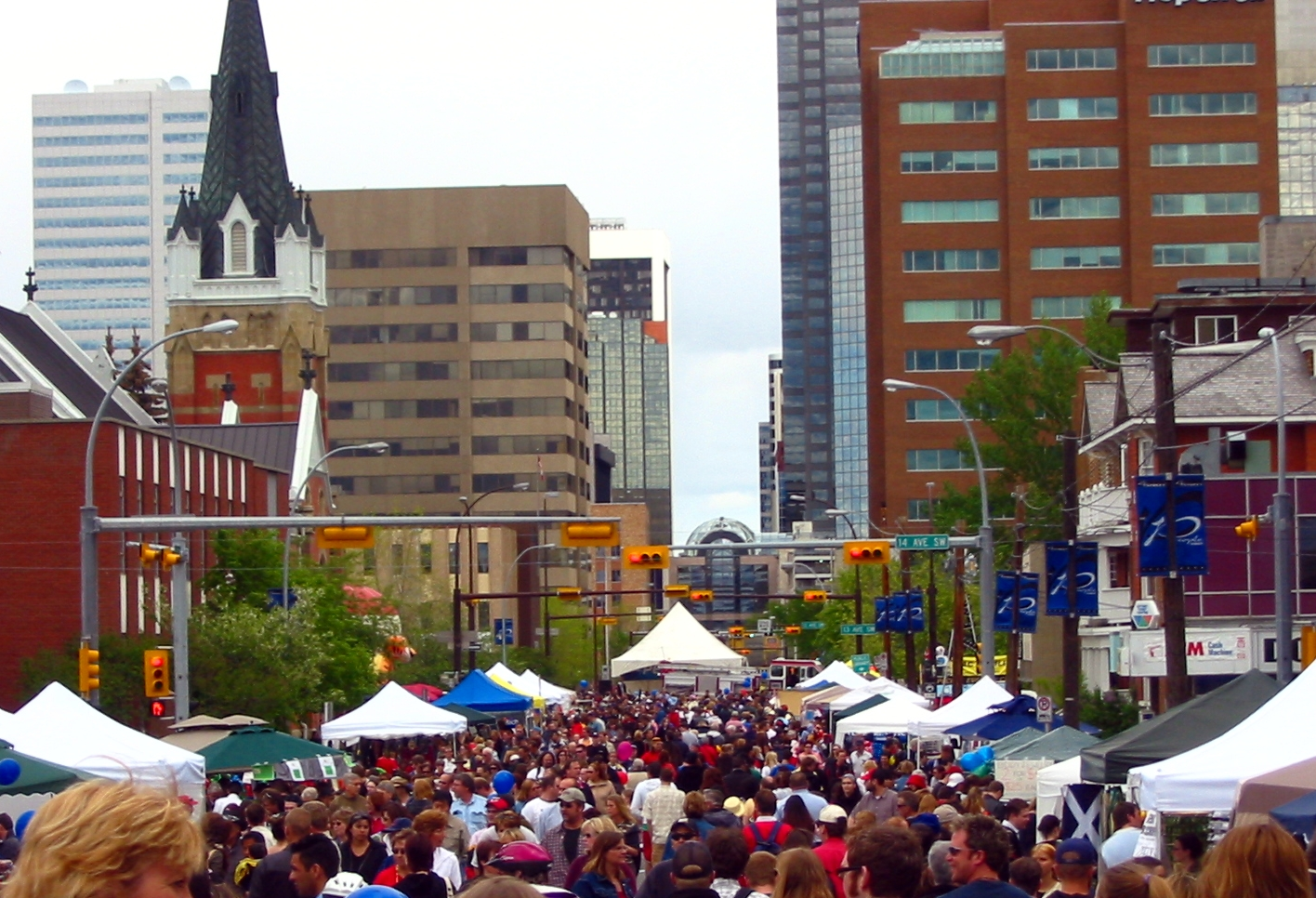
- Crowded street during the 2004 Lilac Festival
- Genre: Street fair
- Dates: Early June
- Locations: Beltline and Mission in Calgary
- Patron: 4th Street BIA
- Website: lilacfestival.net

Lilac festival is an annual street festival held in Calgary, Alberta, Canada. The festival has grown to entertain over 100,000 people each spring. The lilac (Syringa) flowers are often blooming throughout the area at this time.

The festival takes place in the Beltline and Mission neighborhoods, along the thirteen blocks of 4th Street between 12th Avenue SW and Elbow Drive, and also on 17th Avenue between 2nd Street and 5th Street SW. It is an all day free event and is open to all ages. The festival features over 500 vendors such as entertainment stages, street dancing, musical talent, artisan vendors, food, and other business stalls. The festival also includes bouncy castles for young children.

== History ==
The Lilac Festival started out as a small neighborhood celebration in 1989 by the Cliff Bungalow-Mission Community Association and the 4th Street Business Revitalization Zone. In 2005 it had an estimated 120,000 attendance. Lilac Festival was voted Calgary's best free festival in 2006.

In 2023, the festival was held on June 4.

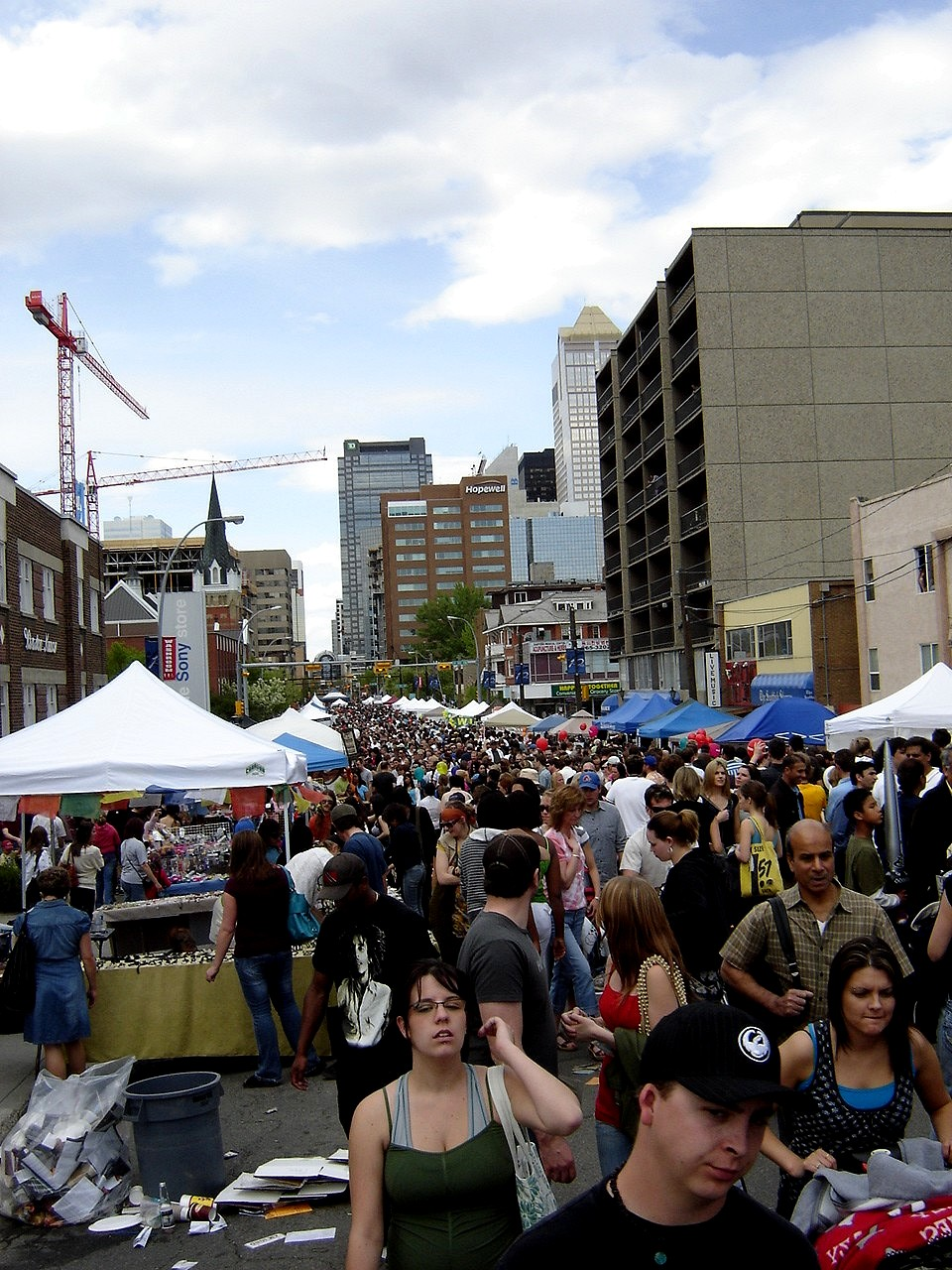
"The Lilac Festival" in Calgary's Mission district

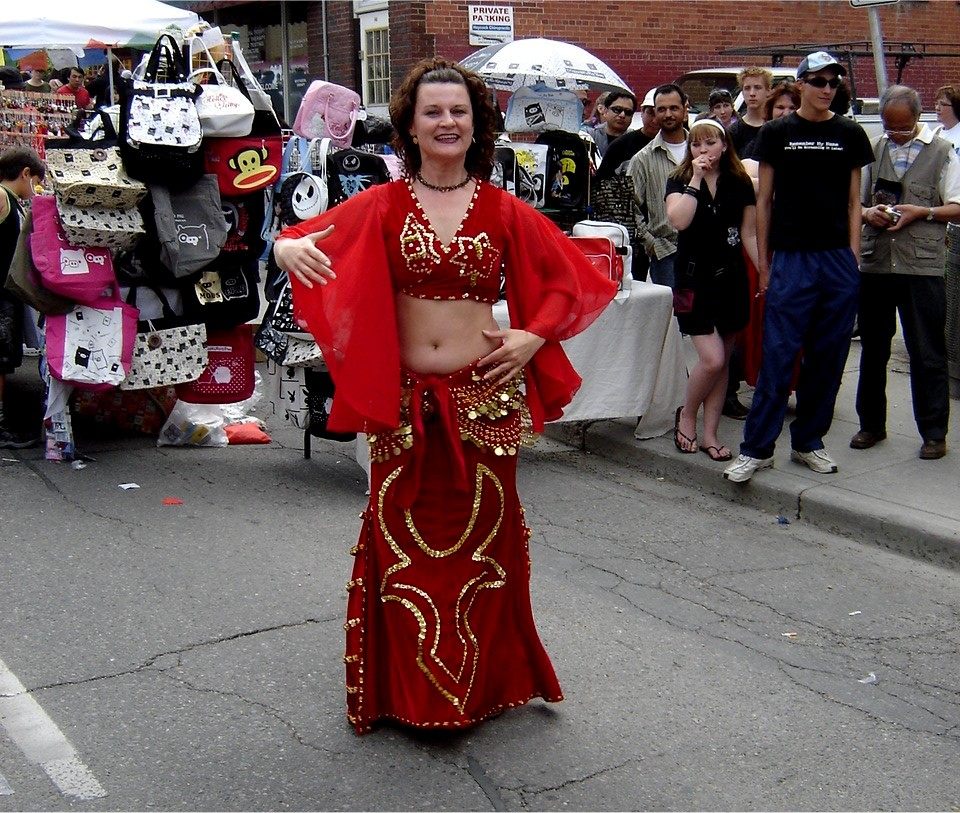
Belly dancer

Knight in shining armour

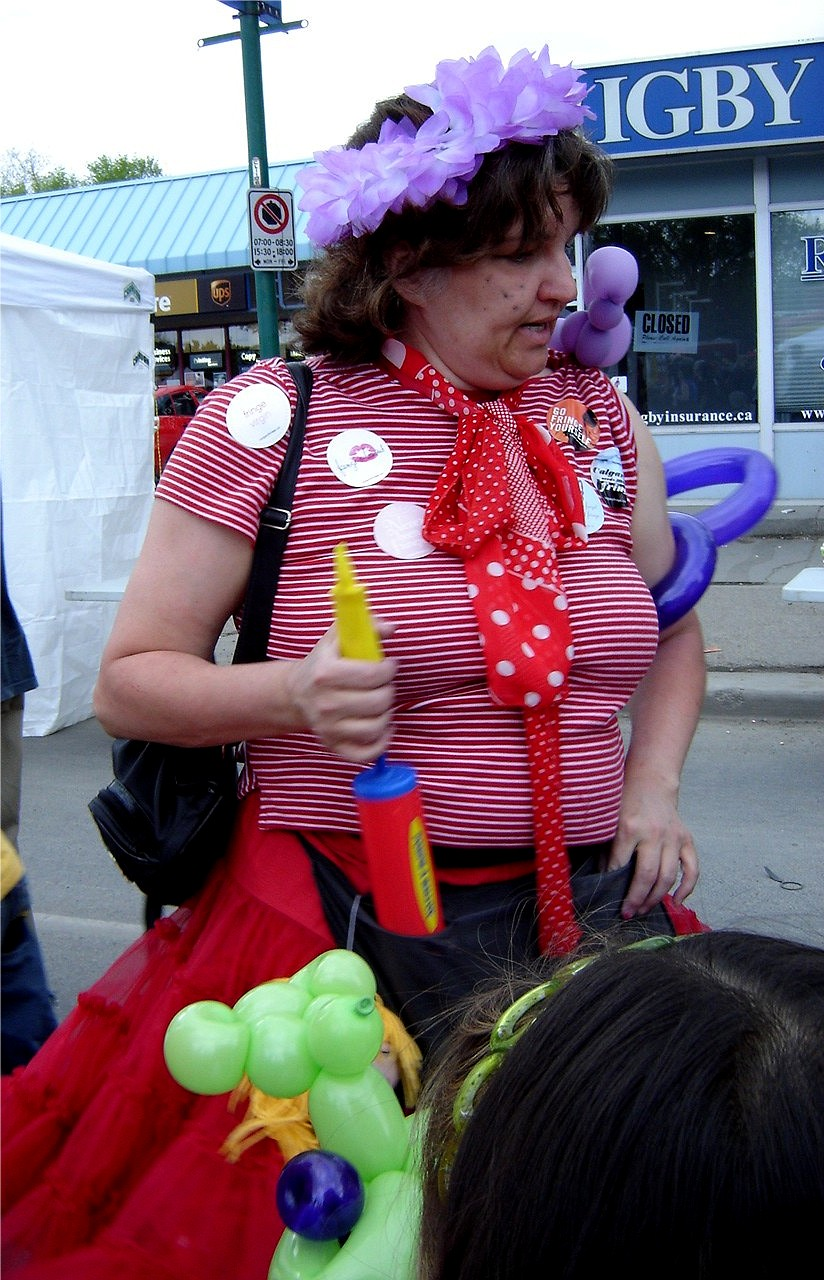
The balloon lady

In 2018, the approximate attendance was over 100,000 people.

The festival was not held in 2020 and 2021 due to the COVID-19 pandemic, but resumed in 2022.

== Sponsors ==
Multiple organizations sponsored the 2023 Lilac Festival:

- TD Bank
- The City of Calgary
- Alberta Culture and Tourism
- Alberta Foundations for the Arts
- 4th Street BIA
- 17th Avenue BIA

Media Sponsor was Calgary-based radio station X92.9

== See also ==
- Festivals in Alberta
- Lilac Festival (Mackinac Island)
- Lilac Festival (New York)
- List of festivals in Calgary
