= Highland Park (Rochester, New York) =

Arboretum in Rochester, New York

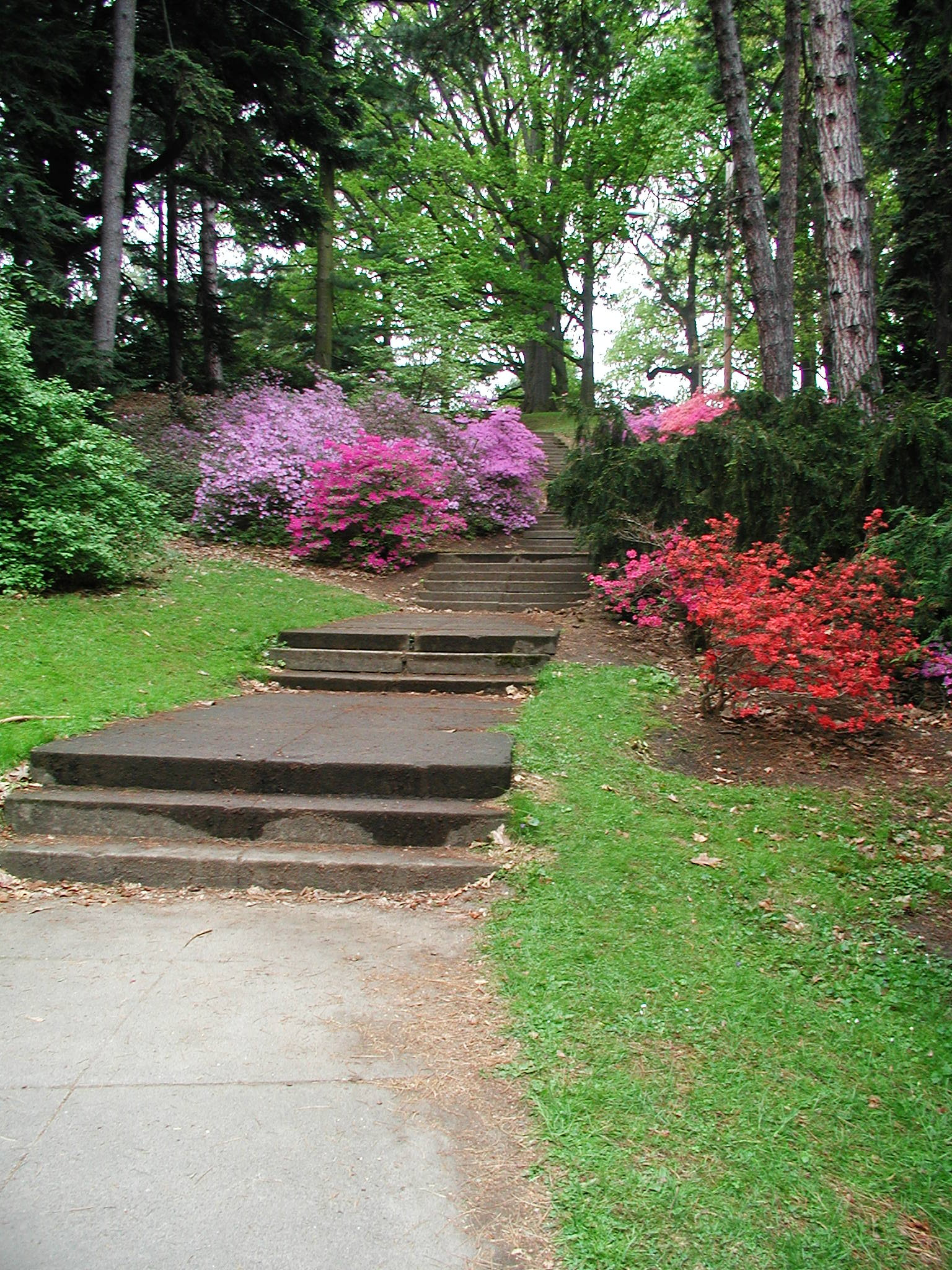
- Stairway in northeastern side of Highland Park

- Location within New York
- Type: Arboretum
- Location: 171 Reservoir Avenue; Rochester, New York
- Coordinates: 43°7′47″N 77°36′23″W
- Area: 150 acres (61 ha)
- Created: 1888
- Operator: Monroe County
- Open: All year

Highland Park, also known as Highland Botanical Park, is an arboretum in Rochester, New York, United States. Its administrative office is located at 171 Reservoir Avenue in Rochester. The park is one of several in Rochester originally designed by Frederick Law Olmsted, including Genesee Valley Park, Maplewood Park, and Seneca Park, which is now a zoo.

== History ==
In 1888, nurserymen George Ellwanger and Patrick Barry endowed the Rochester community with 20 acres (8.1 ha) of land which became Highland Park, one of the nation's first municipal arboretums. Highland Park is one of many parks designed by Frederick Law Olmsted, and was designed with the purpose of retaining a natural appearance. Horticulturist John Dunbar, later known in local circles as Johnny Lilacseed, started the park's famous lilac collection in 1892; some of the 20 varieties he installed were descendants of native Balkan Mountain flowers brought to North America by early colonists.

== Features ==
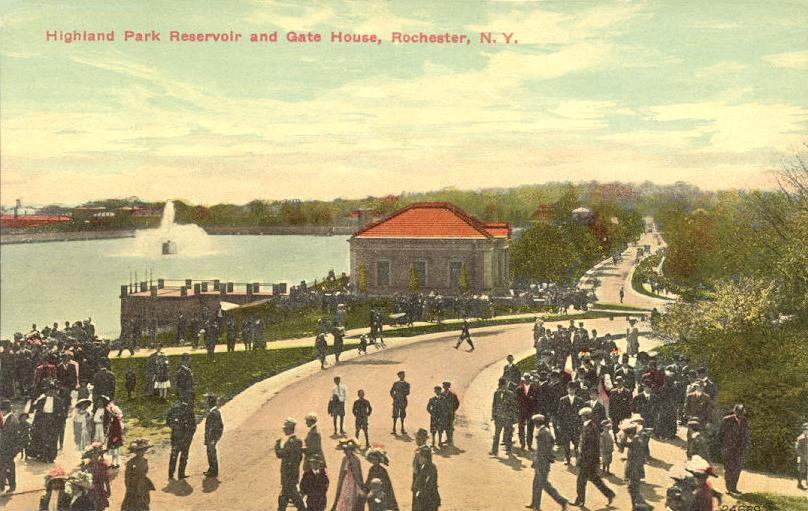
Reservoir c. 1910

The park occupies most of a glacial moraine, sharing the hill with a water reservoir and Colgate Rochester Crozer Divinity School.

Highland Park covers 150 acres (61 ha) and features over 1,200 lilac shrubs representing over 500 varieties. Additional woody plants include Japanese maples, sweet-smelling magnolias, and other tree species; a selection of shrubs including barberries, azaleas, mountain laurel, andromeda, and 700 varieties of rhododendron; and a rock garden with dwarf evergreens. The gardens also feature herbaceous plants including spring bulbs, wildflowers, and a pansy bed with 10,000 plants, designed into an oval floral "carpet" with a pattern that changes each year.

Highland Park has a natural amphitheater, sunken garden, a Gothic-style edifice (known as the "Warner Castle"), and a conservatory greenhouse called Lamberton Conservatory. A statue of Frederick Douglass overlooks the amphitheater. The outdoor amphitheater (Highland Park Bowl) is used for summertime concerts, Shakespeare in the Park, and the Free Movies in the Parks series.

The park consists of many themed / memorial gardens: The Greater Rochester Vietnam Veterans Memorial, The AIDS Remembrance Garden and the Poet's Garden are located in Highland Park South.

== Events ==
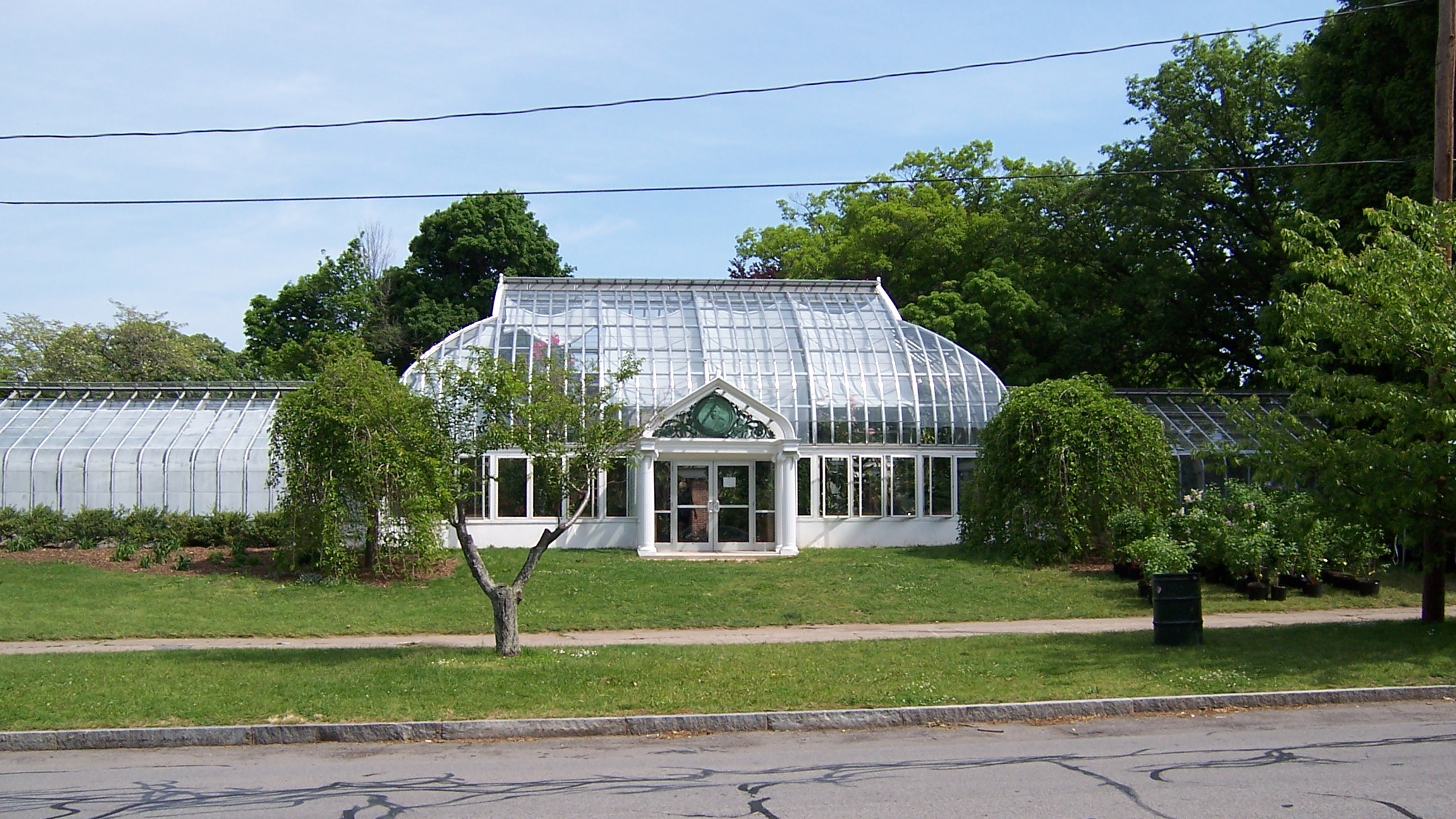
Lamberton Conservatory

Highland Park hosts Rochester's annual Lilac Festival in May, which is the largest festival of its kind in North America and draws spectators from all over the globe. The Rochester Civic Garden Center, housed in Warner Castle, offers public access to a horticultural and botanical library of over 4,000 volumes and sponsors an ongoing series of educational courses.

Since 1997, Rochester Community Players' Shakespeare Players have performed an annual free Shakespeare in the Park production of one of William Shakespeare's plays in early July at the Highland Park Bowl.

=== Goethe Monument ===
On September 17, 1950 a monument was completed in Highland Park to celebrate the 200th anniversary of the poet Johann Wolfgang von Goethe. A committee, chaired by Ewald P. Appelt, raised the required funds. Regional artist and Head of the Sculpture Department at the University of Rochester, William Ehrich (1897–1960), was chosen to construct this monument, describing it as such:

"For the portrayal of Goethe's personality, I considered no particular phase of his life. His spiritual aristocracy appears to me to be the point requiring stress, culminating in his immortal appearance around the age of sixty-five."

During the month of July 2015, the Goethe monument was stolen from Highland Park.

== See also ==
- List of botanical gardens in the United States
