= Soldiers' and Sailors' Monument (Rochester, New York) =

Monument in Rochester, New York

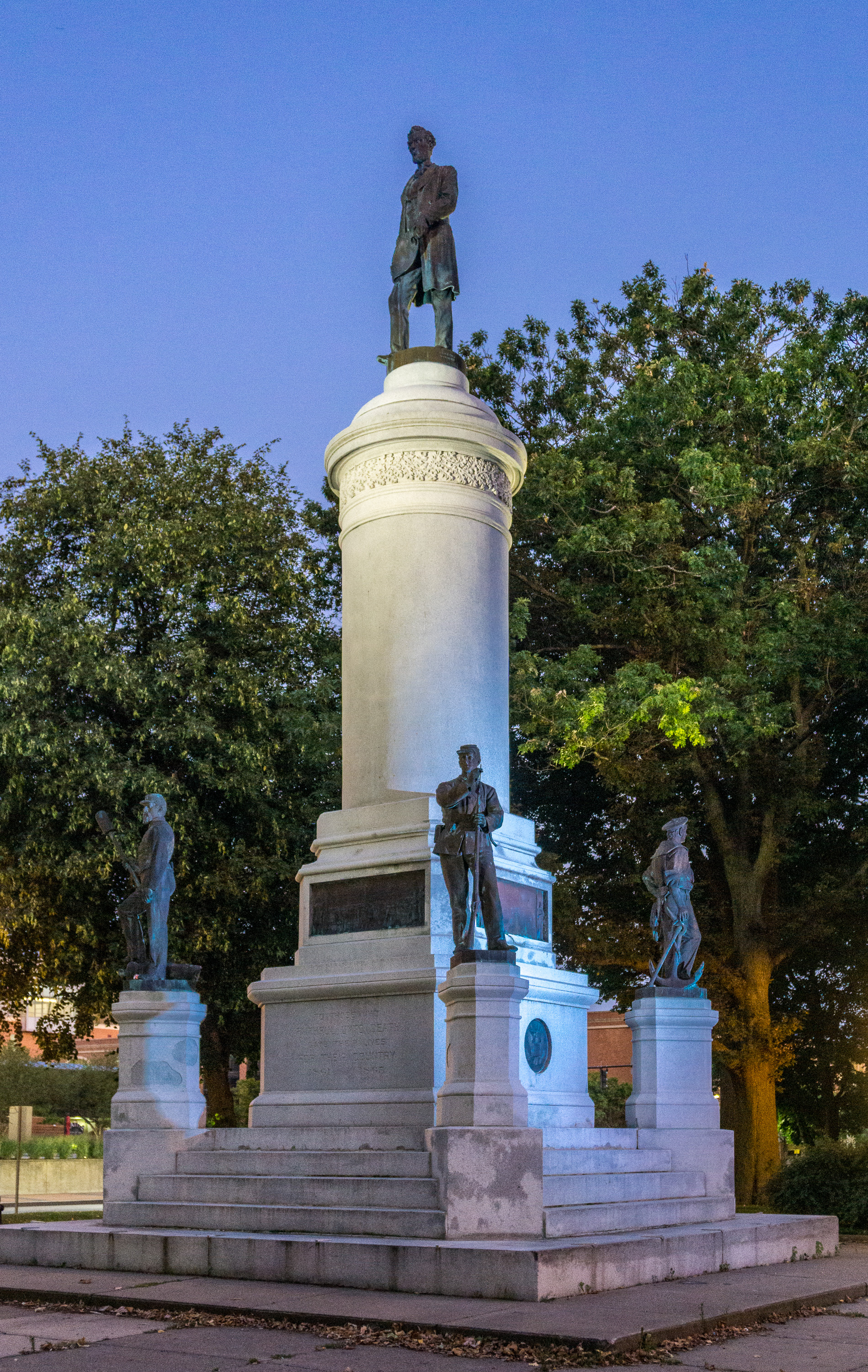
- Interactive map of Soldiers' and Sailors' Monument
- Location: Rochester, New York
- Coordinates: 43°09′12″N 77°36′19″W
- Designer: Leonard Wells Volk
- Dedicated date: May 30, 1892

The Soldiers' and Sailors' Monument is a monument in Washington Square Park in Rochester, New York. Designed by Leonard Wells Volk, it was erected in 1892. The huge monument weighed 140 tons, in total, and was moved into place by the Hilbert Truck Company, co-owned by George F. Roth of Rochester.

The At the top of the 42-foot monument stands a bronze figure of Abraham Lincoln astride a granite shaft. Four bronze figures symbolize the infantry, cavalry, marines, and artillery. The panels of the monument depict key moments of the American Civil War: the land battles at Fort Sumter, Gettysburg, and Appomattox, and the naval battle between the USS Monitor and CSA Virginia. The total cost of the monument was $26,000.

== Dedication ==
The statue was dedicated on May 30, 1892, accompanied by a parade of 10,000 people, including war veterans and schoolboys. Speeches were delivered by U.S. President Benjamin Harrison, New York Governor Roswell P. Flower, and reformer Frederick Douglass. Also present at the ceremony were state Senator Cornelius R. Parsons, Rochester Mayor Richard J. Curran, and the president of the University of Rochester.

Harrison's dedication speech emphasized unity and reconciliation, referencing the North and South's "mutual respect" and "common country." Harrison praised "Southern hearts" for their renewed "love of the old flag." The president's 1,023-word address failed to mention slavery or abolition.
