= Washington Square Park (Rochester, New York) =

Urban park in Rochester, New York

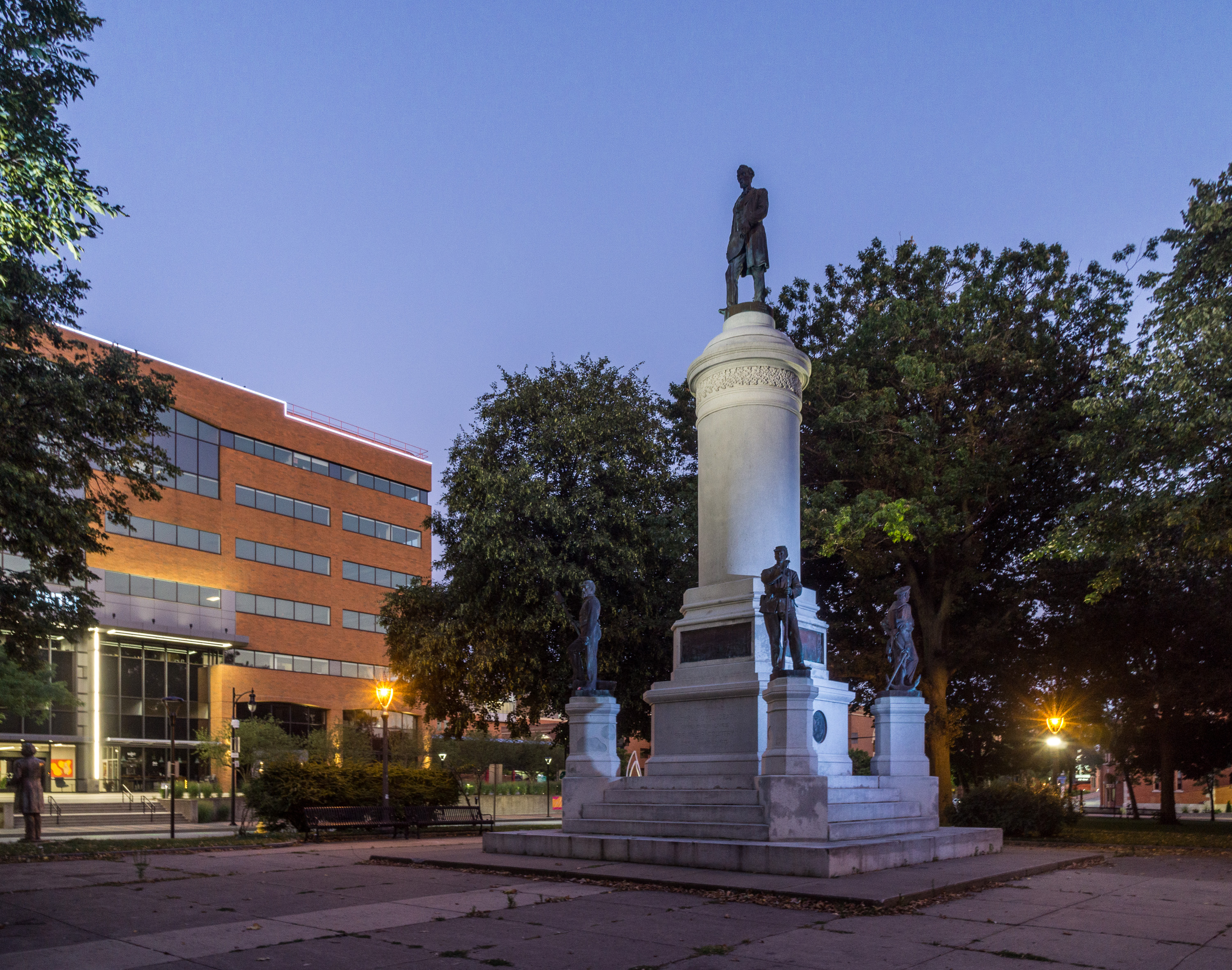
- Washington Square Park in Rochester, New York

- Location within New York
- Type: Urban park
- Coordinates: 43.1534°N 77.6053°W
- Created: 1817
- Operator: Monroe County
- Open: All year

Washington Square Park is an urban park in Rochester, New York. It contains the Soldiers' and Sailors' Monument, erected in 1892.

== History ==
It was formerly known as Johnson's Square. The land for the park was donated to the public by Elisha Johnson in 1817.

On 1 August 1848, it was the site of a public address by Frederick Douglass. Douglass also spoke there in 1852.

In 1892, U.S. President Benjamin Harrison spoke at the dedication of the Soldiers' and Sailors' Monument, without mentioning slavery, despite Frederick Douglass's presence next to the podium.

Austin Steward wrote in his Twenty-Two Years a Slave, and Forty Years a Freeman that numerous Black Americans celebrated the end of slavery in New York in Johnson's Square on July 5.

In 2017, the Washington Square Park Neighborhood Association received a $15,000 grant to develop a new Master Plan for the park.

== Austrian cannon ==
An Austrian cannon captured by the Italian army during the Battle of Vittorio Veneto in World War I was given as a gift to Rochester in 1921 by the Italian government. The cannon was given as a symbol of the patriotism of the large Italian immigrant population in Rochester at the time. At least 1,400 Rochester residents Italian descent fought in the war. The cannon was restored and rededicated in 2017 in time for the centenary of World War I.
