= Seneca Park Zoo =

Zoo in Rochester, New York, US

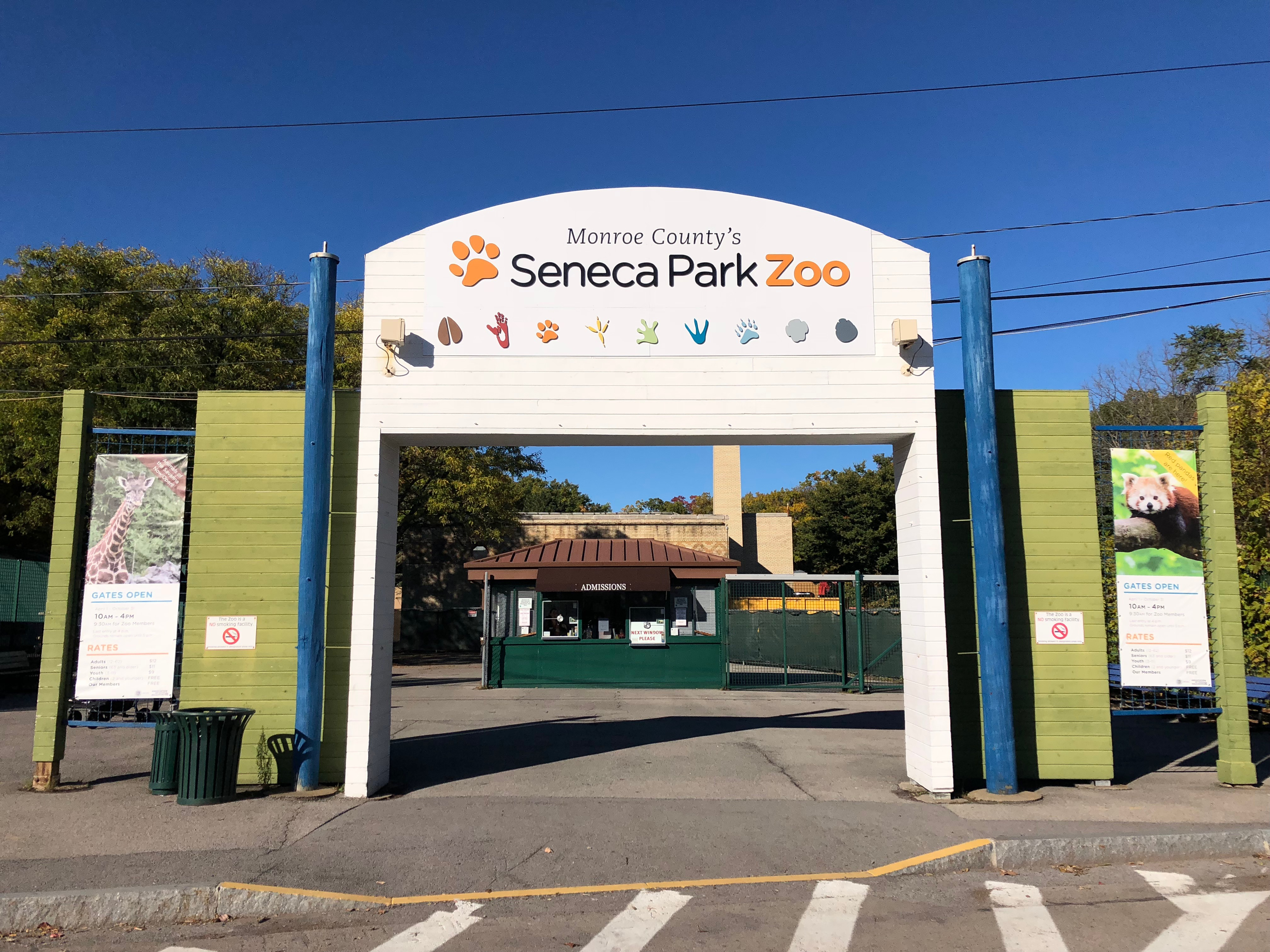
- Entrance to Seneca Park Zoo
- Interactive map of Seneca Park Zoo
- 43.2065°N 77.6238°W
- Date opened: 1894
- Location: Rochester, New York, United States
- Land area: 20 acres (8.1 ha)
- Annual visitors: 335,663 (2015)
- Memberships: AZA
- Major exhibits: Animals of the Savanna, A Step into Africa, Cold Asia, Genesee Trail, Rocky Coasts
- Website: senecaparkzoo.org

Seneca Park Zoo is a 20-acre (6.3 ha) zoo located in the city of Rochester, New York, US. The zoo is home to over 90 species including mammals, reptiles, birds, amphibians, fish, and arachnids. It is accredited by the Association of Zoos and Aquariums (AZA). The zoo is operated by Monroe County, with support from the Seneca Park Zoo Society. The zoo opened in 1894 in Seneca Park.

== History ==
Seneca Park, designed by Frederick Law Olmsted, is located on the border of the City of Rochester and the Town of Irondequoit, along the Genesee River. The park was opened in 1893, and animals started being displayed in 1894. The first major addition to the zoo was the Main Zoo Building in 1931. The building was home to a wide variety of animals.

The Seneca Park Zoo Society was chartered as an educational institution by New York State in 1957. Since that time, the Society has evolved into a non-profit organization that supports and promotes the zoo by running educational programs, special events, marketing and public relations efforts, fundraising for in situ wildlife conservation, and food and gift operations. The Society offers memberships that are very popular with area families.

In 1975, a polar bear grotto was opened to house the zoo's two polar bears (Penny and Nickels), who had been acquired using pennies and nickels collected by local school children. In 1993, the zoo opened the $2 million Genesee Trail and Discovery Center—its first landscape immersion exhibit. This was followed in 1997 by the $8.2 million Rocky Coasts exhibit.

On May 17, 2012, the zoo opened A Step Into Africa, which was designed to replicate a portion of the NgoroNgoro Crater in Tanzania. This section of the zoo houses African bush elephants, olive baboons, Southern African lions, and domestic goats.

In 2018, the zoo began making arrangements to demolish the Main Zoo Building as it no longer meets today's standards of animal welfare. On June 2, the zoo opened a Cold Asia portion, featuring a new exhibit for the zoo's snow leopards and bringing in red pandas. During that same year, an extension of A Step Into Africa opened with a new home for the resident southern white rhinoceros, and will feature new animals like Masai giraffes, plains zebras, ostriches, naked mole-rats, rock hyraxes, Lake Malawi cichlids, and many more.

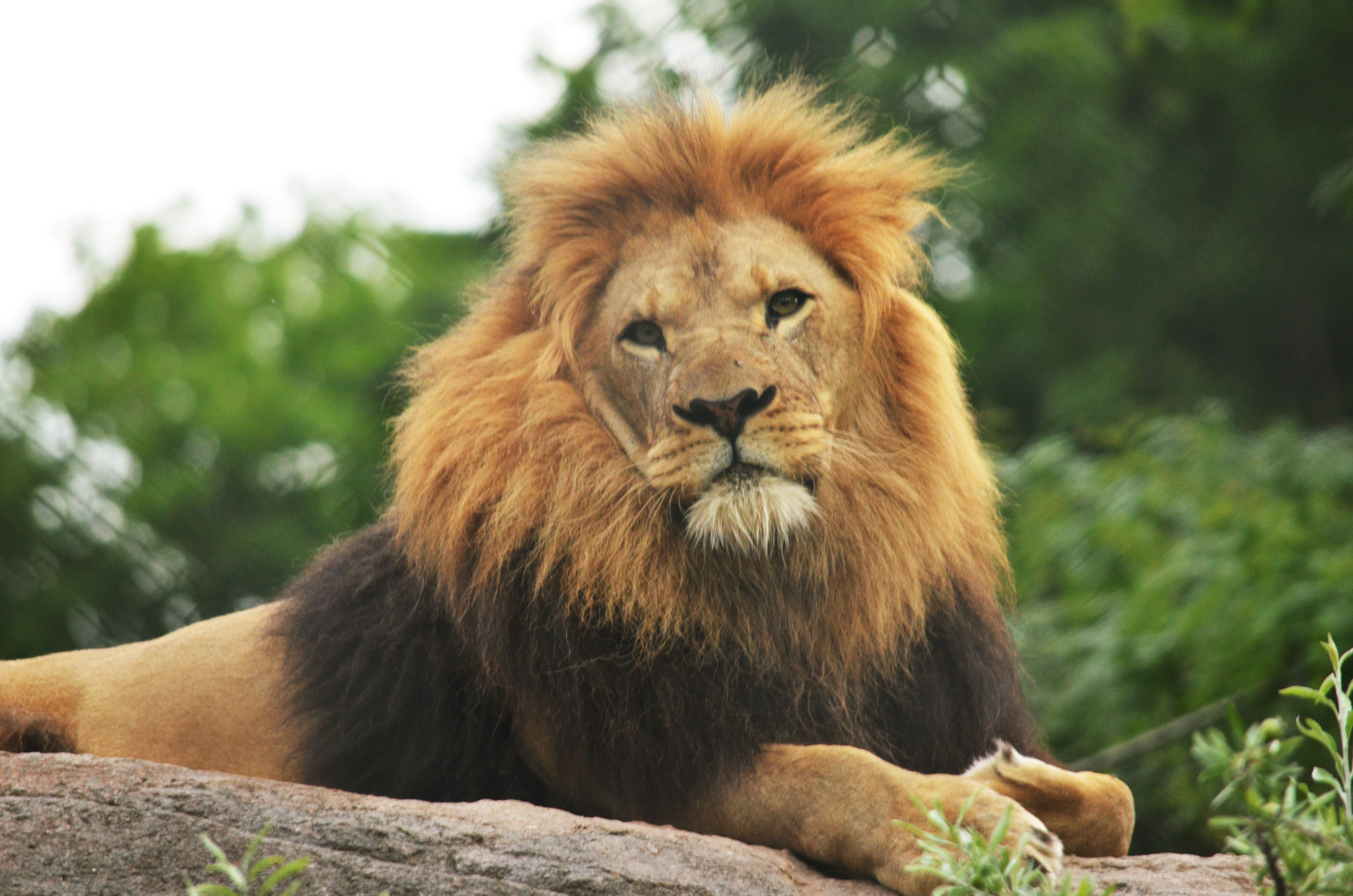
Chester, a male Southern African lion at the zoo

== Exhibits ==
The Rocky Coasts exhibit opened in 1997. It is an area dedicated to animals of the polar and temperate coastal regions of the world, including African penguins, a polar bear, California sea lions, snowy owls, Canada lynxes, and sandhill cranes.

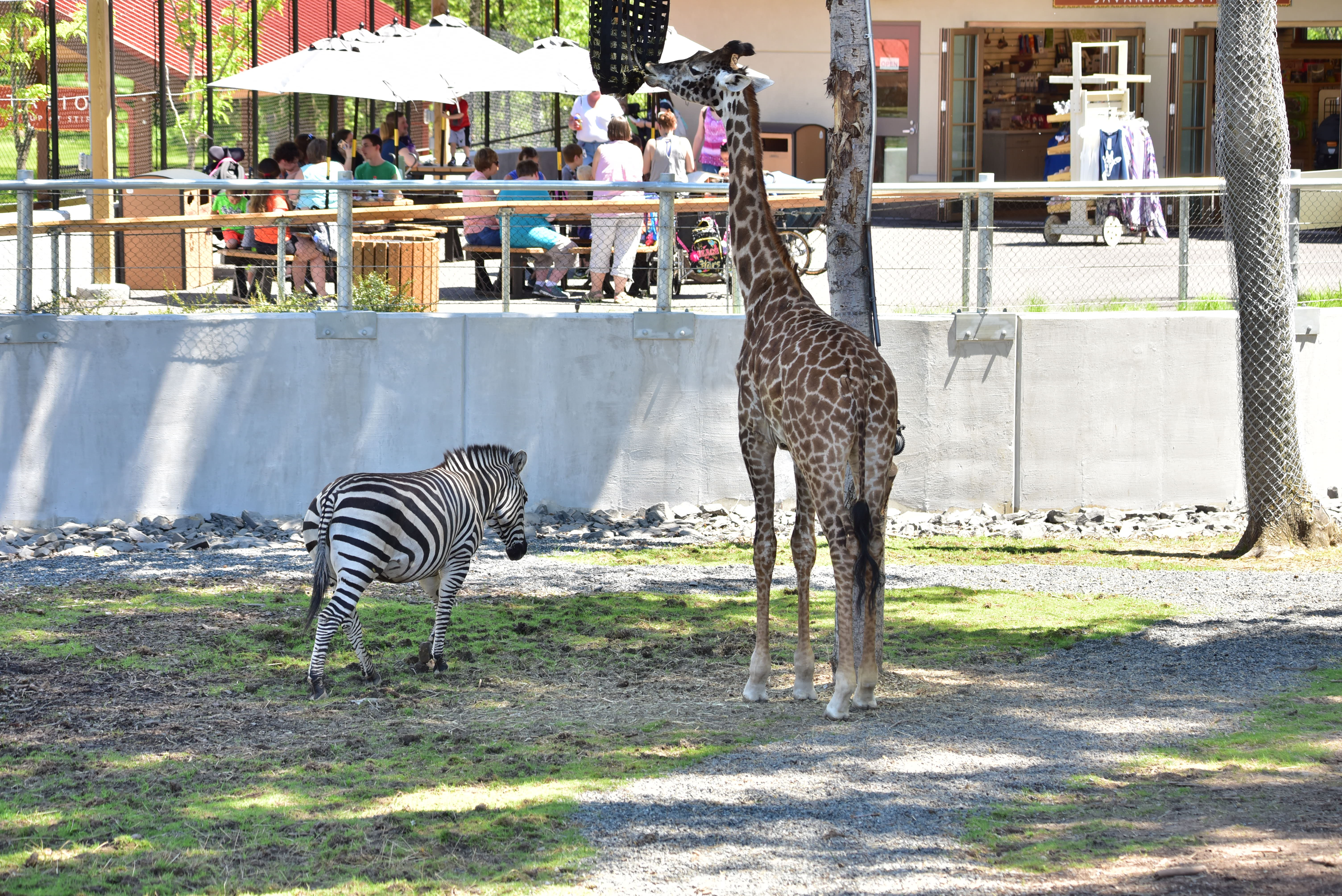
The Animals of the Savanna expansion opened in September 2018 and features Masai giraffes, plains zebras, and more.

A Step Into Africa was unveiled in 2012 and the exhibit includes a replica Maasai hut, Dig Zone for uncovering casts of fossils, interactive learning tools, and a stationary safari bus from which the zoo's African lions can be viewed. The area is home to the zoo's African bush elephants, olive baboons, and (Southern) African lions in naturalistic settings. Seneca Park Zoo is home to the first three African bush elephants in New York State, and in 2018, the area was expanded with a southern white rhinoceros named Jiwe, Masai giraffes, Grant's zebras, naked mole-rats, and birds.

The Cold Asia exhibit opened in 2018, and houses red pandas, snow leopards, chickenhawks, wolves, and an Amur tiger.

In the Creatures By The River's Edge habitat, there are red-eared slider turtles, a bald eagle, Panamanian golden frogs, lake sturgeons, Burmese pythons, and North American river otters.

The zoo's animal collection changes periodically with AZA recommendations regarding breeding through the Species Survival Plans (SSPs), animal deaths and births. The spring of 2013 proved to be a very fruitful time at the zoo as it welcomed two lion cubs, six African penguin chicks, one golden lion tamarin baby, three domestic goat kids, a California sea lion pup and a Bornean orangutan baby. In 2018, Seneca Park Zoo began its multi-year Master Plan improvement. The first elements of a Cold Asia area opened next to the animal hospital in June, which included new habitats for snow leopards and red pandas. In September 2018, the zoo opened up a new African exhibit called Animals of the Savanna. The five-acre area includes Masai giraffes, plains zebras, a white rhino, naked mole rats, an aviary, and some other smaller exhibits.

== Education and conservation ==
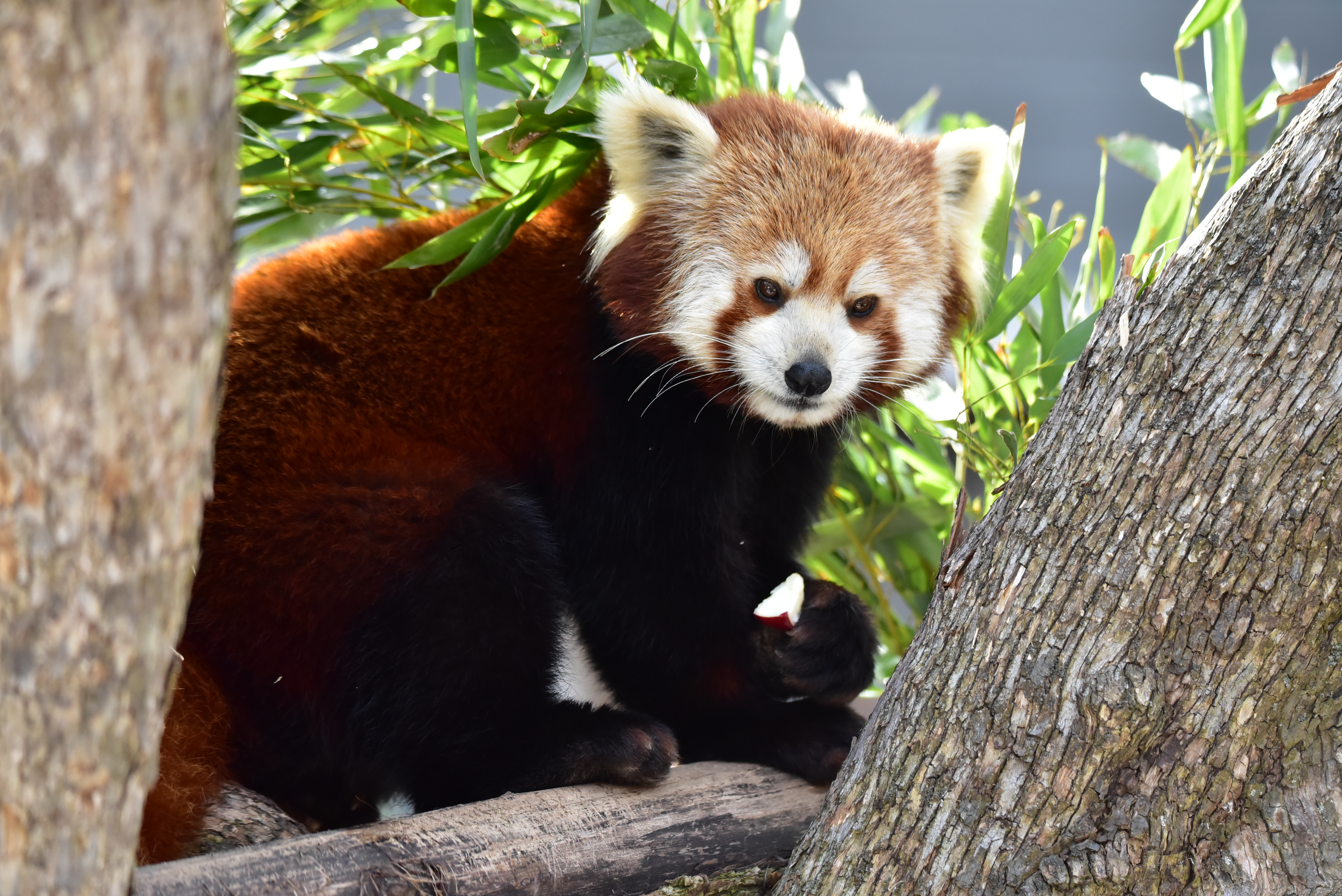
The Zoo welcomed red pandas in spring of 2018.

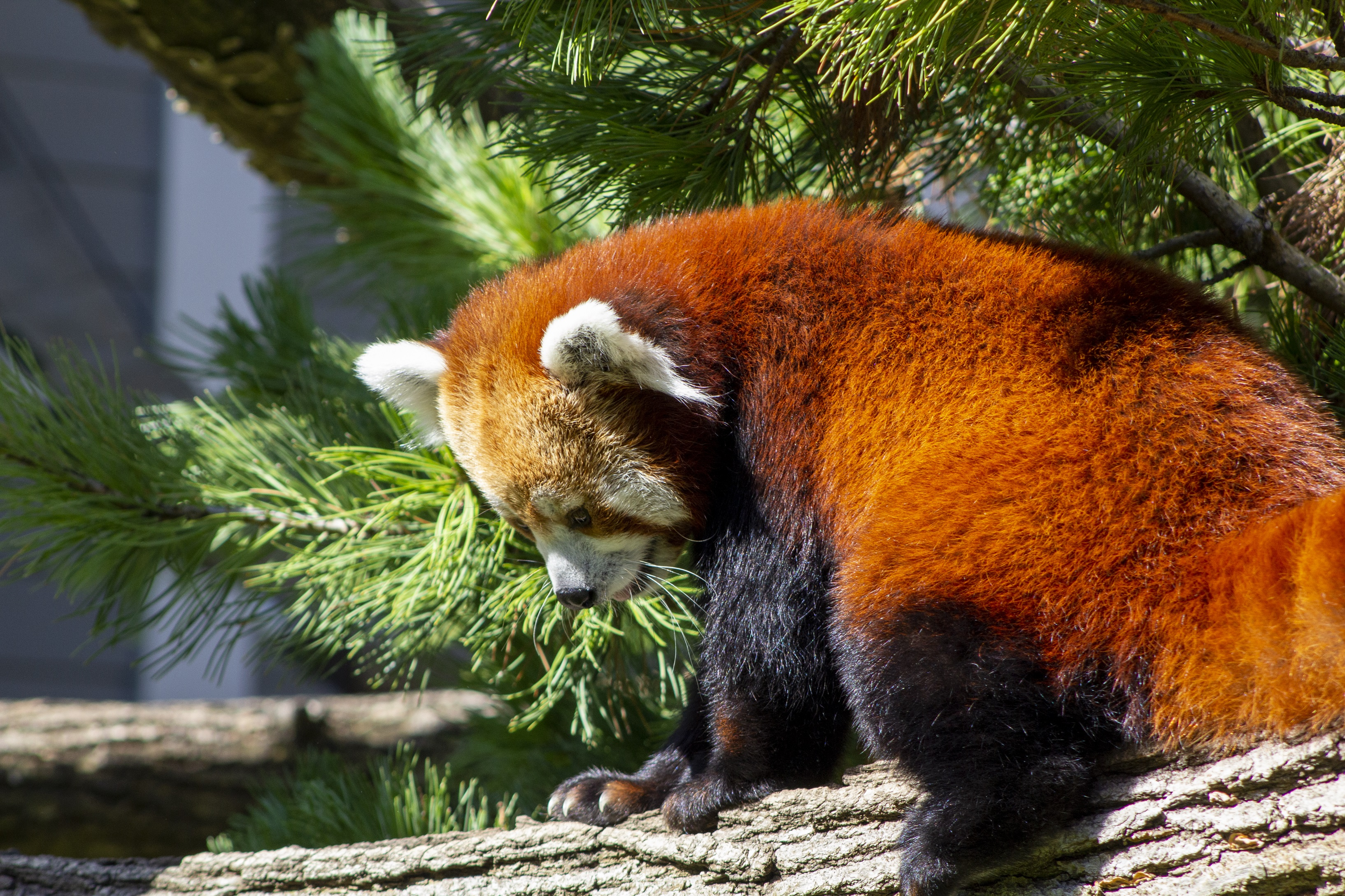
Red Panda at Seneca Park Zoo Rochester, NY 2023

Seneca Park Zoo reaches out to many communities in the Western New York region to educate the public with regards to animal and resource conservation, environmental awareness and recycling programs. The zoo is a popular destination for school field trips and the zoo has created expeditions for schoolchildren to learn specific lessons in a zoo setting. The ZooMobile, sponsored by Wegmans, brings small, transportable animals to places like recreation centers, libraries, festivals, senior living facilities and schools. The Butterfly Beltway program, sponsored by the Daisy Marquis Jones Foundation, is a program aimed at planting butterfly gardens to increase populations of monarch butterflies, vital pollinators in the region. Additional programs such as summer programming, ZooCamp and ZooTeens give the community an opportunity to enjoy first-hand experiences with educators, zoo keepers and animals.

== Events ==
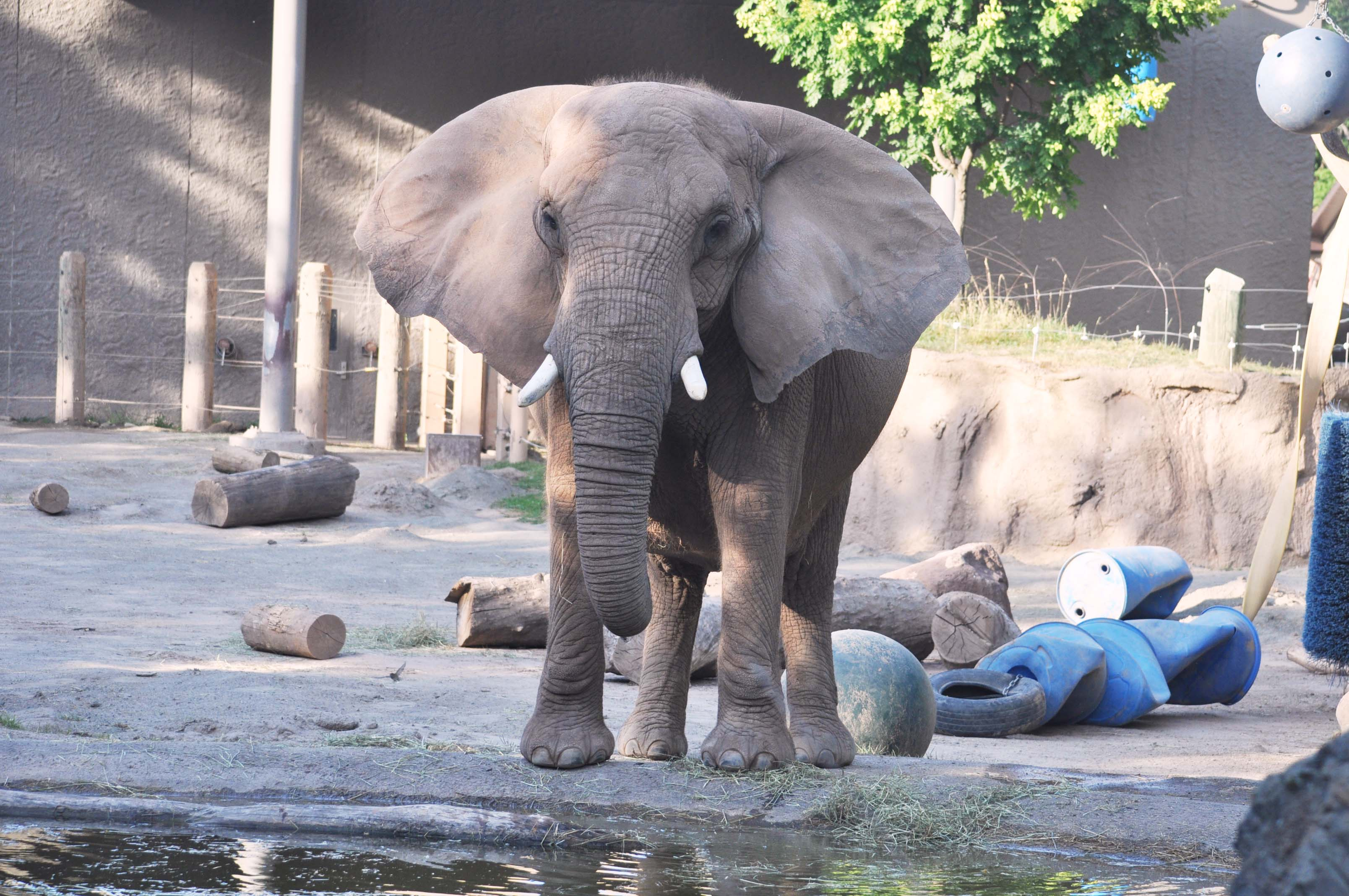
Seneca Park Zoo is the first Zoo in New York State home to African bush elephants

Seneca Park Zoo hosts many events throughout the year including free-with-admission events such as conservation education days and daily 'Summer Experiences' from Memorial Day Weekend through Labor Day. Popular fundraisers include ZooBrew, Zoobilation (annual gala), ZooBoo (Halloween), and Breakfast with Santa. The Jungle Jog 5K race that occurs in July of each year boasts a course that takes runners through Seneca Park and the zoo. This 5K is extremely popular with area runners and families.
