= Rochester Lilac Festival =

Spring festival in Rochester, New York

- Lilac Festival 2005 at Highland Park
- Genre: Horticultural / arts festival
- Frequency: Annual (10 days in May)
- Locations: Highland Park, Rochester, New York
- Coordinates: 43.127484°N 77.609714°W
- Established: 1898; 128 years ago
- Attendance: 500,000+
- Website: roclilacfest.com

The Rochester Lilac Festival is an annual art, music, food, and horticultural festival held in early to mid-May in Highland Park in Rochester, New York. The park's collection comprises approximately 1,200 lilac shrubs representing more than 500 varieties across 22 acres (8.9 ha) of the park's grounds. Described as the largest free festival of its kind in North America, the Rochester Lilac Festival draws more than 500,000 visitors over its ten-day run and is one of the oldest celebrations of lilacs in the United States. Admission to the festival and to Highland Park is free of charge.

The festival features live music on multiple stages, a juried art show, the Lilac Parade, food vendors, a farmers market, family activities, and the annual Lilac Run road races. The Highland Park arboretum and nearby Ellwanger Garden can be toured free of charge and are open to all visitors.

== History ==
=== Origins (1888–1907) ===
In 1888, nurserymen George Ellwanger and Patrick Barry donated 20 acres (8.1 ha) of gently rolling hills to the City of Rochester; the land became Highland Park. It became one of the nation's first municipal arboretums, and renowned park designer Frederick Law Olmsted oversaw the final development of the grounds.

Beginning in 1890, horticulturist John Dunbar planted the park's first lilac bushes; by 1892 the collection had grown to 20 varieties, some descended from slips of native Balkan Mountain flowers carried to the New World by early colonists. Dunbar introduced more than 30 new lilac varieties during his tenure and became known locally as "Johnny Lilacseed."

The informal origin of the festival dates to 1898, when approximately 3,000 people spontaneously gathered in the park one Sunday in May to see the lilacs in bloom. In 1905, this annual gathering was formalized as "Lilac Sunday."

=== Growth and expansion (1908–present) ===
In 1908, the first large organized lilac festival attracted approximately 25,000 visitors. Bernard H. Slavin, Dunbar's successor as Highland Park superintendent and a former staff member at the Arnold Arboretum, dramatically expanded the lilac collection during the early and mid-twentieth century.

The festival continued to grow in scope and attendance over the following decades. In 1978, organizers expanded it from a single weekend to its now-familiar ten-day format. By the early twenty-first century, annual attendance regularly exceeded 500,000 visitors.

The 2020 edition was cancelled due to the COVID-19 pandemic. The festival returned in 2021 and 2022 on a modified three-weekend schedule before reverting to its traditional ten consecutive days in 2023. In 2025, Jenny LoMaglio of Best Recipe Productions became the festival's first woman executive producer.

== Highland Park lilac collection ==
Highland Park's lilac collection is one of the largest in the world, comprising approximately 1,200 shrubs of more than 500 varieties spread across 22 acres (8.9 ha) of the park's total 155 acres (0.63 km^{2}). John Dunbar introduced over 30 new varieties during his decades of work at the park. Among his most notable introductions is the 'President Lincoln' cultivar (1916), which is widely regarded as one of the finest blue lilacs ever developed.

The 'Rochester' cultivar, a creamy white variety, was introduced in 1963 and named in honor of the city. The collection's range of bloom times is carefully managed so that different varieties flower in succession throughout the spring season.

Bernard H. Slavin, who succeeded Dunbar as superintendent, brought expertise from his prior work at the Arnold Arboretum at Harvard University and continued to broaden the collection's diversity and renown during the mid-twentieth century.

== Festival features ==
The Rochester Lilac Festival offers a wide range of events and activities:

- Live music — More than 100 performances across three stages over the course of the festival
- Art in the Park — A juried art show featuring more than 100 artists
- Lilac Parade — An annual parade with more than 2,000 participants marking the opening of the festival
- Lilac Run — A USATF-certified 5K and 10K road race, hosted annually since 1980; the 47th annual race is scheduled for 2026
- Food and drink — Dozens of food vendors and a farmers market
- Family activities — Children's entertainment, garden tours, and educational programming
- Sensory Space — A dedicated quiet area created in partnership with AutismUp, designed for visitors with sensory sensitivities

== Records and recognition ==
In May 2014, during the festival, 2,797 people gathered in Highland Park to form the largest human flower, setting a Guinness World Record.

In 2017, festival-goers set a United States record for the longest hug relay, completing 596 consecutive hugs.

In 2025, the Rochester Lilac Festival was nominated for USA Today 10Best "Best Flower Festival in the USA."

== Organization ==
The Rochester Lilac Festival is organized by the Lilac Festival Board, a collaborative body that includes representatives from Monroe County, the City of Rochester, and Visit Rochester. Highland Park is part of the Monroe County Parks System. Free admission has been a hallmark of the festival since its inception and remains a central organizing principle.

== See also ==
- Highland Park
- Lilac Festival
