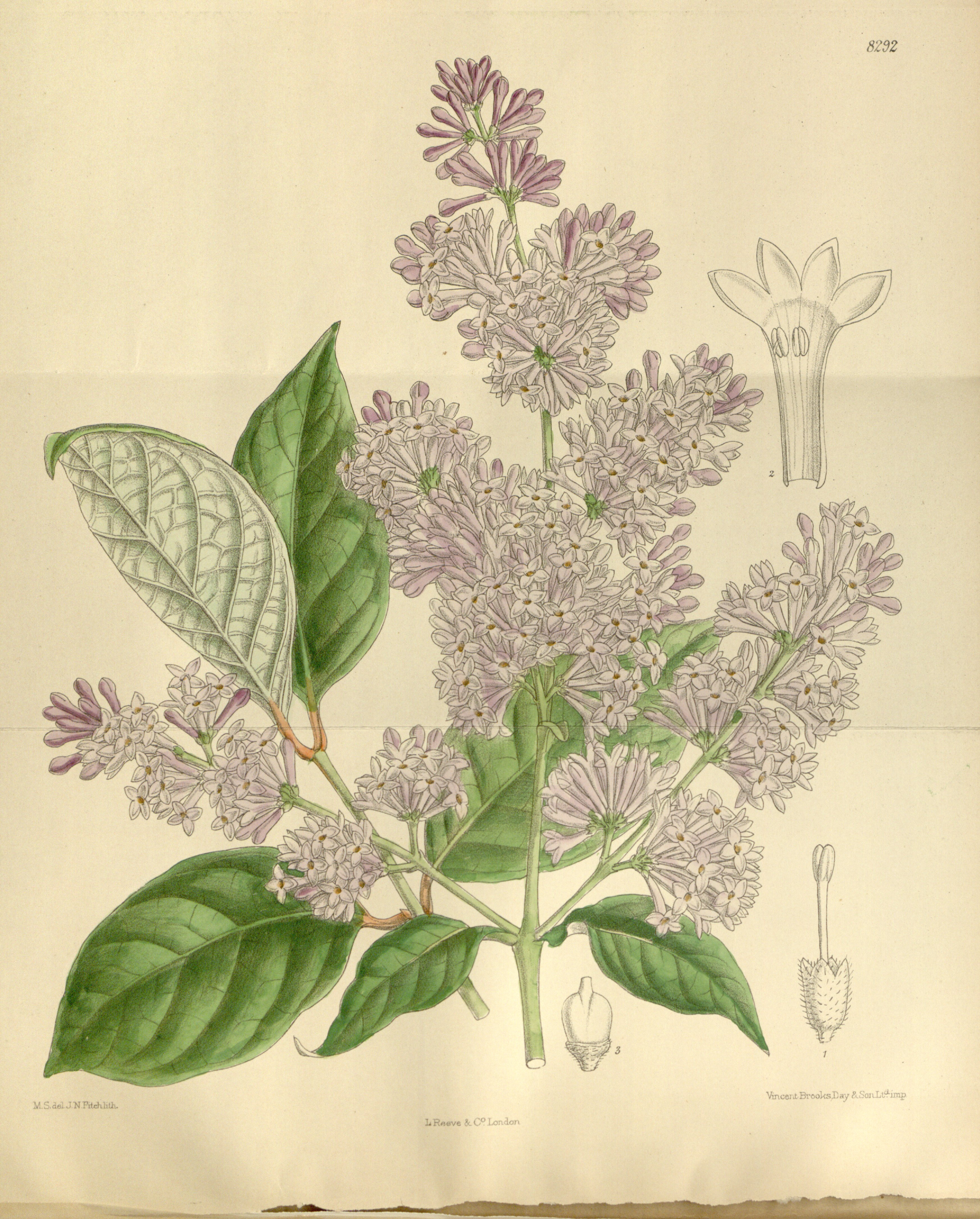

Conservation status
- Least Concern (IUCN 3.1)

Scientific classification
- Kingdom: Plantae
- Clade: Embryophytes
- Clade: Tracheophytes
- Clade: Spermatophytes
- Clade: Angiosperms
- Clade: Eudicots
- Clade: Asterids
- Order: Lamiales
- Family: Oleaceae
- Genus: Syringa
- Species: S. villosa

Binomial name
- Syringa villosa Vahl

= Syringa villosa =

Species of flowering plant

Syringa villosa, the villous lilac or late lilac is a shrub native to Korea, the southern part of the Russian Far East (Primorye) and northern China. There are two subspecies currently recognized (April 2014); these are regarded as separate species in Flora of China. Combining the ranges for the two taxa yields a range within China of Hebei, Shanxi, Heilongjiang, Jilin, and Liaoning.

Syringa villosa is a shrub that grows up to 4 metres (13 ft) tall, with red, white, pink or purple flowers. The flowers are long and highly fragrant, and flower in early summer.

== Subspecies ==
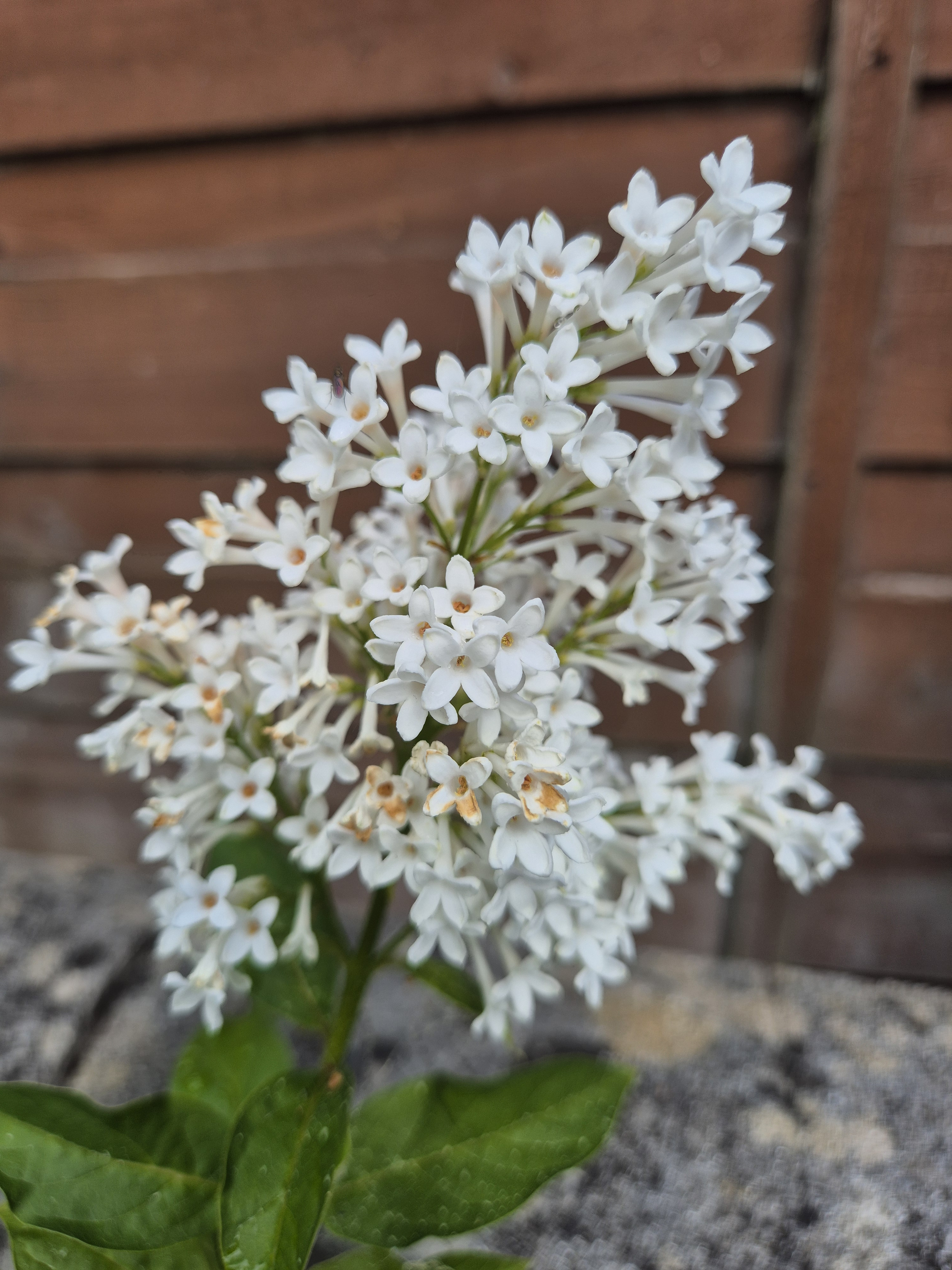
Syringa villosa plant exported and growing in Scotland

- Syringa villosa subsp. villosa
- Syringa villosa subsp. wolfii (C.K.Schneid.) Jin Y.Chen & D.Y.Hong – (syn. Syringa wolfii C.K.Schneid.)
