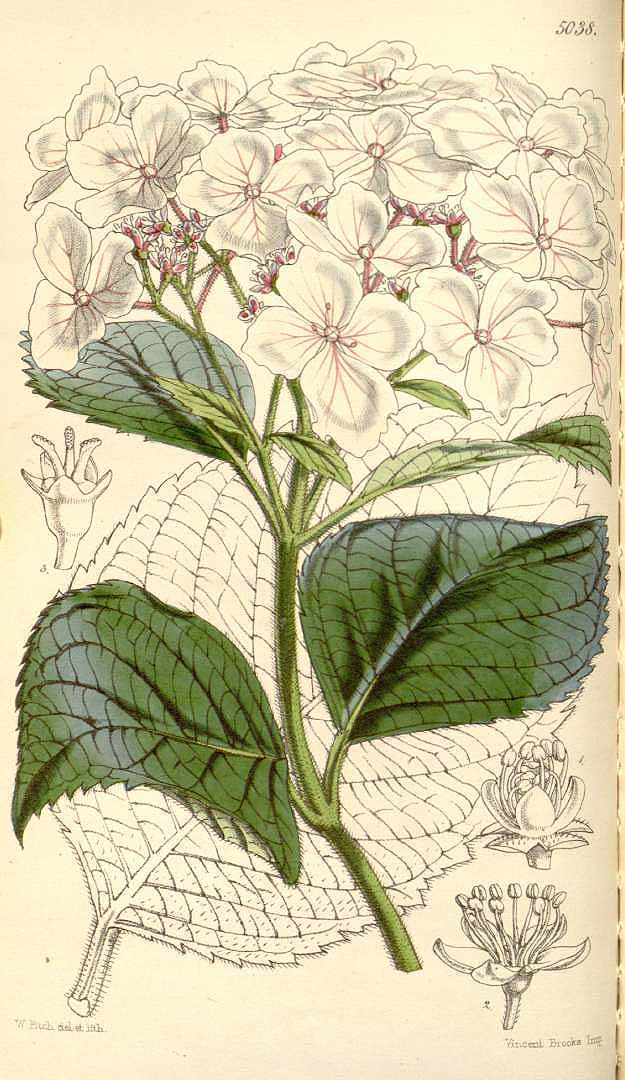

Scientific classification
- Kingdom: Plantae
- Clade: Tracheophytes
- Clade: Angiosperms
- Clade: Eudicots
- Clade: Asterids
- Order: Cornales
- Family: Hydrangeaceae
- Genus: Hydrangea
- Species: H. stylosa

Binomial name
- Hydrangea stylosa Hook.f. & Thomson

= Hydrangea stylosa =

Species of flowering plant

Hydrangea stylosa is a species of flowering plant in the family Hydrangeaceae, native to China.

== Description ==
H. stylosa is a shrub around 1.5 meters tall (~5 ft.) with branches which become more pubescent with age, eventually reaching a grey-white colour. The petioles of are 1.5–3 cm (0.5–1 in.) in size and are pubescent and brown in colour. These bear glabrous, papery leaves roughly 6–14 cm by 3–7 cm (3-5.5 in x 1–2.75 in). The leaves may have midvein pubescence.

The inflorescence of H. stylosa is a corymbose cyme, 5–10 cm wide (2–4 in). The sterile flowers of the species have three to four sepals which are broadly ovate to broadly elliptical in shape, unequal, and roughly 0.5–2 cm (0.12–0.78 in) in size some with denticulated margins. Flowers which are fertile have campanulate calyx tubes which are ovate to suborbicular in shape, 1–1.5 mm (0.04–0.06 in) in size, and with obtuse apexes. After flowering, the 2.5–3.5 cm (1–1.4 in) oblong, blue, and slightly unequal petals of H. stylosa reflex. There are ten subequal stamens in an H. stylosa flower, the longest of these are longer than the petals. The anthers of this species are blue, oblong, and roughly 1 mm in size.

H. stylosa seeds are brown, ellipsoid to oblong in shape, and 0.5–0.8 mm in size. The seeds are shortly winged on one or both ends with a net veined seed coat.

== Habitat ==
H. stylosa is found growing in dense forests in the mountainous regions of western Yunnan Province, China at elevations between 2,700 and 3,000 m (8,900 and 9,800 ft) above sea level.
