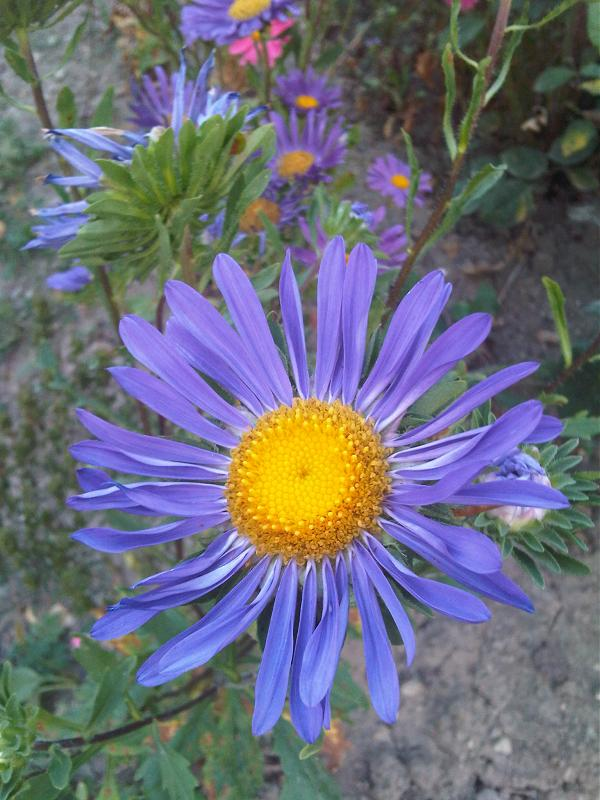

Scientific classification
- Kingdom: Plantae
- Clade: Embryophytes
- Clade: Tracheophytes
- Clade: Spermatophytes
- Clade: Angiosperms
- Clade: Eudicots
- Clade: Asterids
- Order: Asterales
- Family: Asteraceae
- Subfamily: Asteroideae
- Tribe: Astereae
- Subtribe: Asterinae
- Genus: Callistephus; Cass.
- Species: C. chinensis

Binomial name
- Callistephus chinensis (L.) Nees

Synonyms
- Callistemma Cass.; Aster chinensis L.; Brachyactis chinensis (L.) Bureau & Franch.; Callistephus lacinians Borbás; Amellus speciosus Gaterau; Asteriscodes Moench ex Kuntze; Callistemma chinensis (L.) Skeels; Asteriscodes chinense (L.) Kuntze; Aster regalis Salisb.; Aster lacinians Borbás; Diplopappus chinensis (L.) Less.; Callistemma hortense Cass.; Callistephus hortensis (Cass.) Cass.

= Callistephus =

Species of plant

Callistephus /kæˈlɪstɪfəs/ is a monotypic genus of flowering plants in the aster family, Asteraceae, containing the single species Callistephus chinensis. Its common names include China aster and annual aster. It is native to China and Korea. and it is cultivated worldwide as an ornamental plant in cottage gardens and as a cut flower.

== Description ==
This is an annual or biennial plant with one erect, mostly unbranched stem growing 20–100 cm (7.9–39.4 in) tall. The alternately arranged leaves vary in shape or size. The basal leaves usually fall away before flowering. Leaves around the middle of the stem are a few centimeters long and are borne on winged petioles. The blades have serrated edges. Leaves toward the top may have smooth edges. The large solitary flower head grows at the top of the stem and sometimes on branches. The head is lined with layers of phyllaries, those in the outer layer large and leaflike, measuring up to 3 centimeters long. The inner layer can be purple-tinged. The head contains one or two rings of ray florets, most often in shades of reddish purple. The flowering period is from August to October in the northern hemisphere.

== Cultivation ==
This species has been grown and bred extensively in cultivation. Cultivars are available with flowers of many colors, varying heights, and single and double heads. In the wild, they are purple in color. There are several cultivars with flowers of different colors. Cultivars with flowers of other colors were obtained in particular by hybridization. Cultivated varieties can have ray florets in most any color, including red, pink, blue, purple, and white. They are up to 3.5 centimeters long. There are many yellow disc florets in the center. The fruit is a rough-textured, glandular, purple-mottled cypsela that turns gray with age. It has a pappus composed of one outer layer of reddish scales and two inner layers of white bristles.

It has been in cultivation in Europe since 1728 at the latest. In China, it has been cultivated for 2000 years.

== Distribution ==
This plant is a naturalized species in some areas outside of its native range (Indochina, Europe, North America, Australia, New Zealand, etc.) and can be found on the edges of deciduous forests. It grows at altitudes from 300 to 2700 above mean sea level. As an ornamental plant it thrives on fresh, nutrient-rich, easy-humus rich soils in warm humid air conditioning.

== Pests and diseases ==
The plants are susceptible to fusarium wilt, a fungal disease. Some cultivars are more resistant to this than others. Pest insects can include leafhoppers, aphids, blister beetles, and the tarnished plant bug. The plant is also susceptible to mites.

== Gallery ==
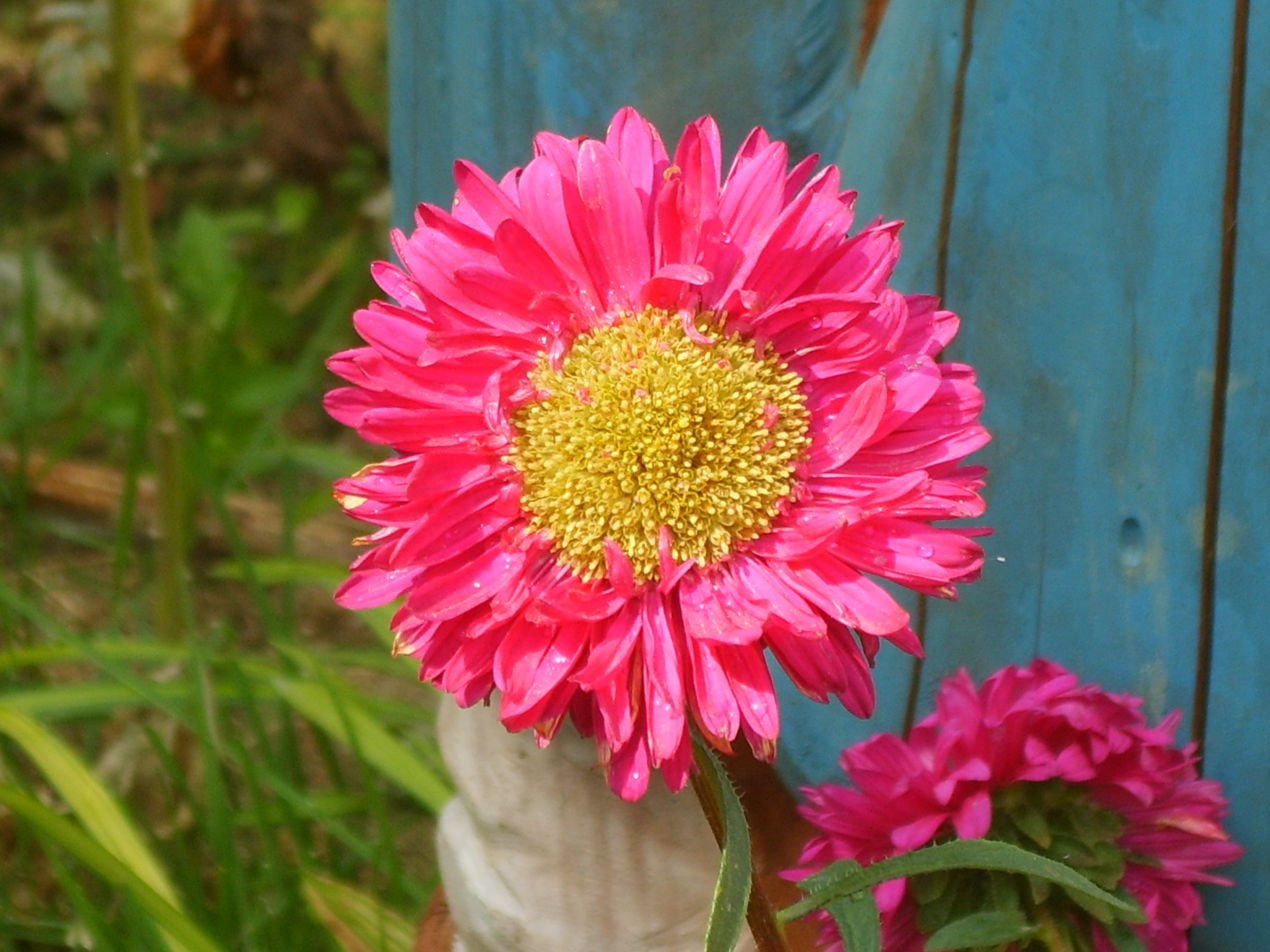
In pink

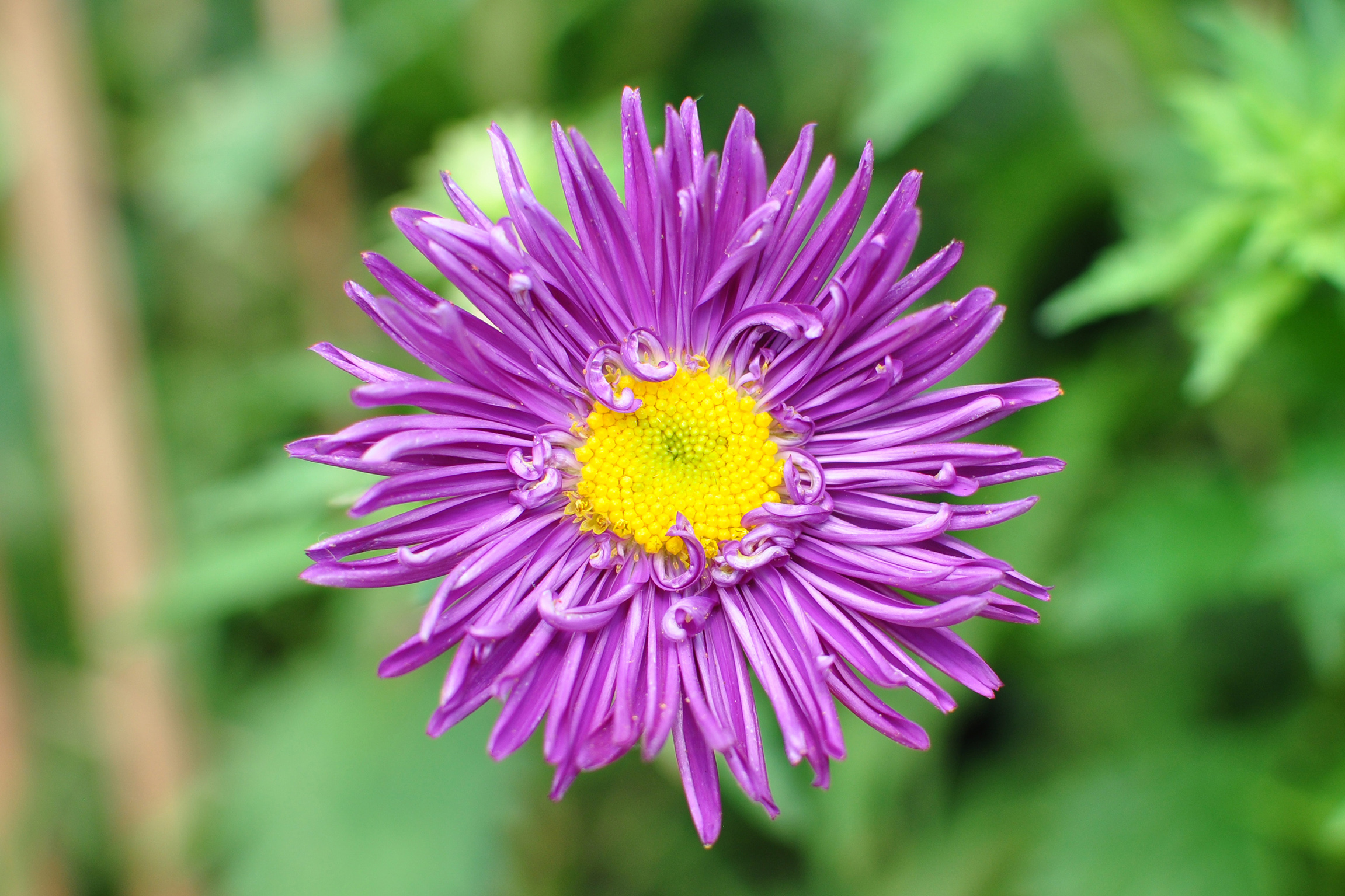
In lilac

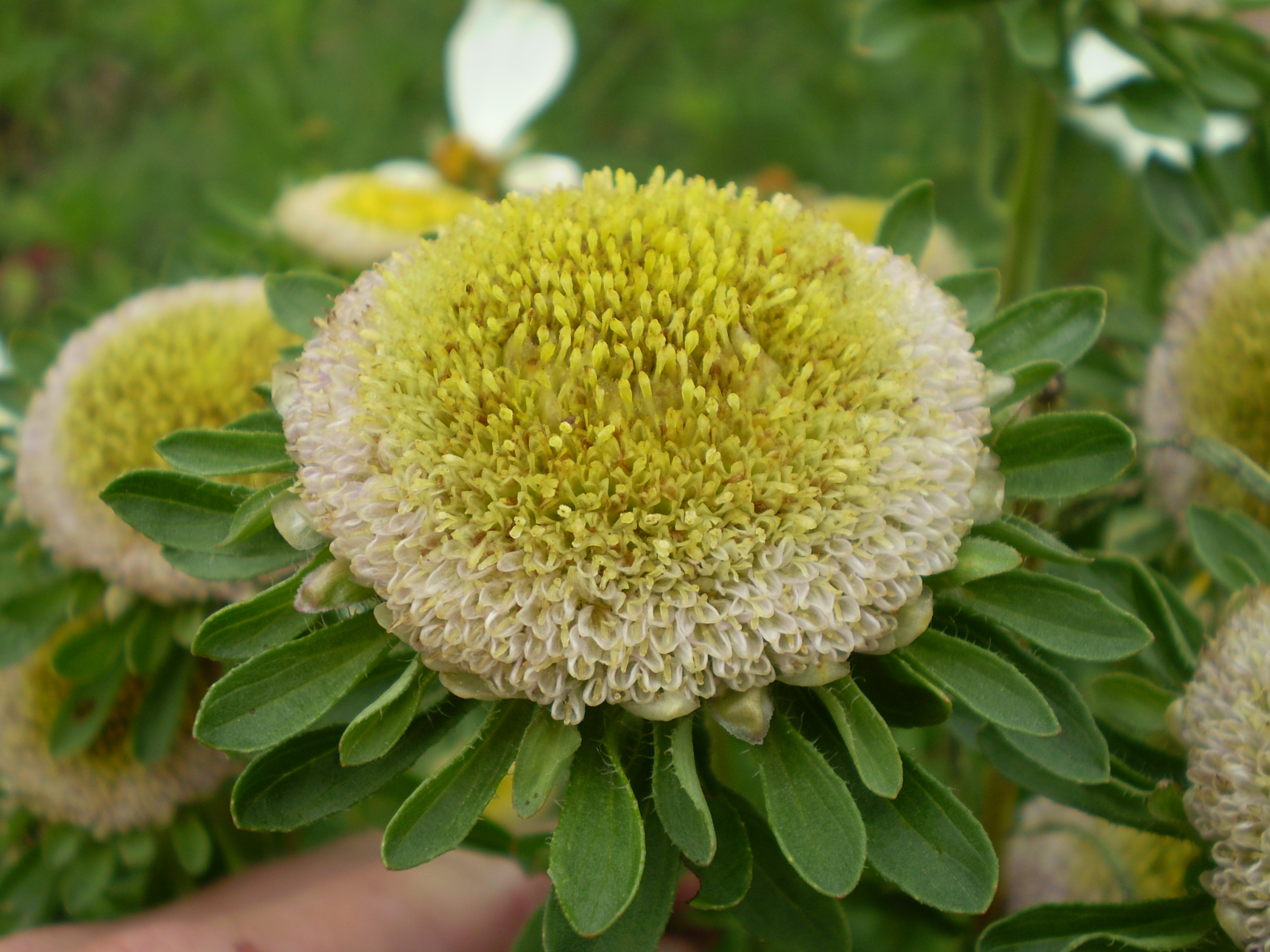
In yellow

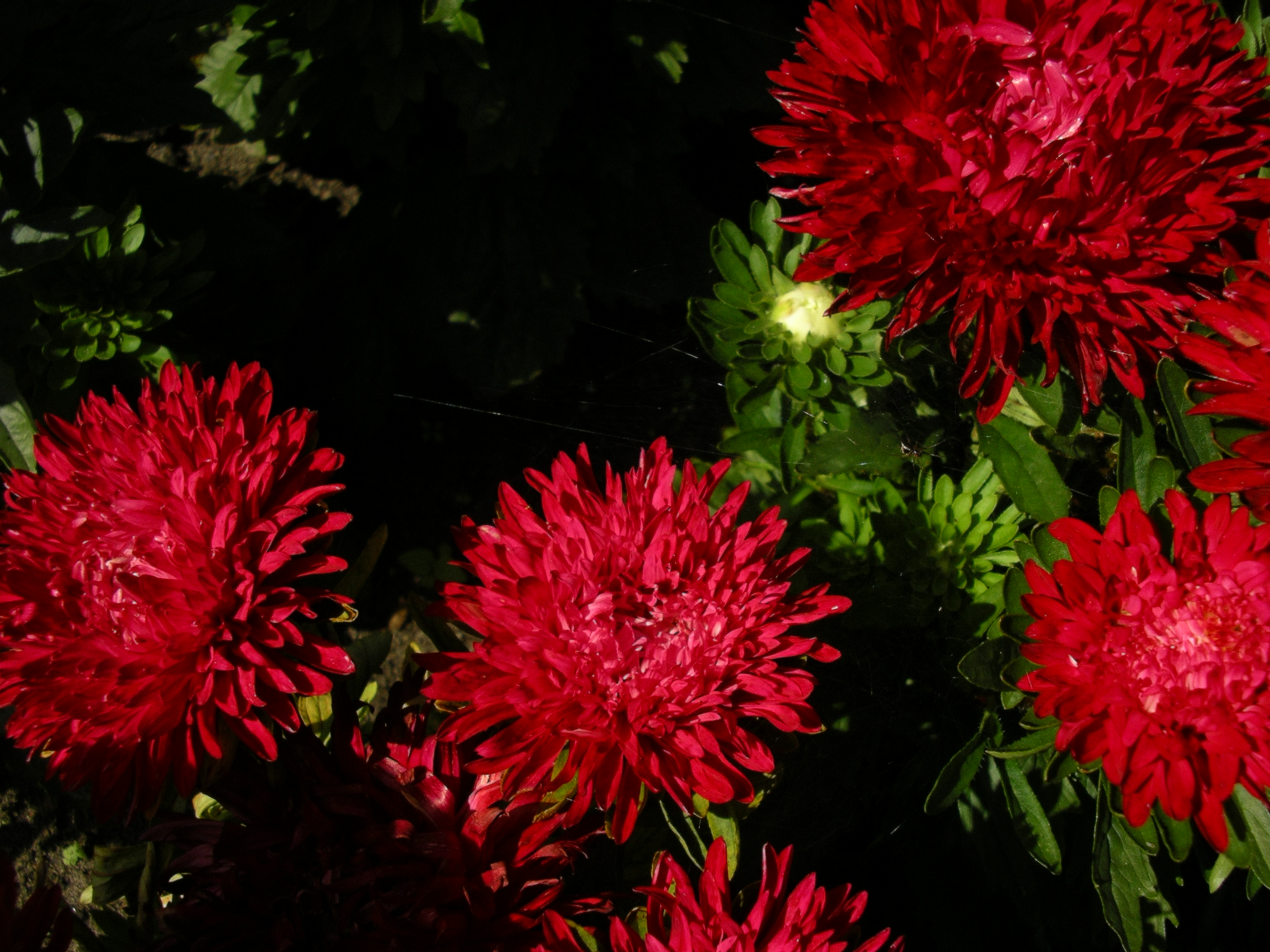
Red

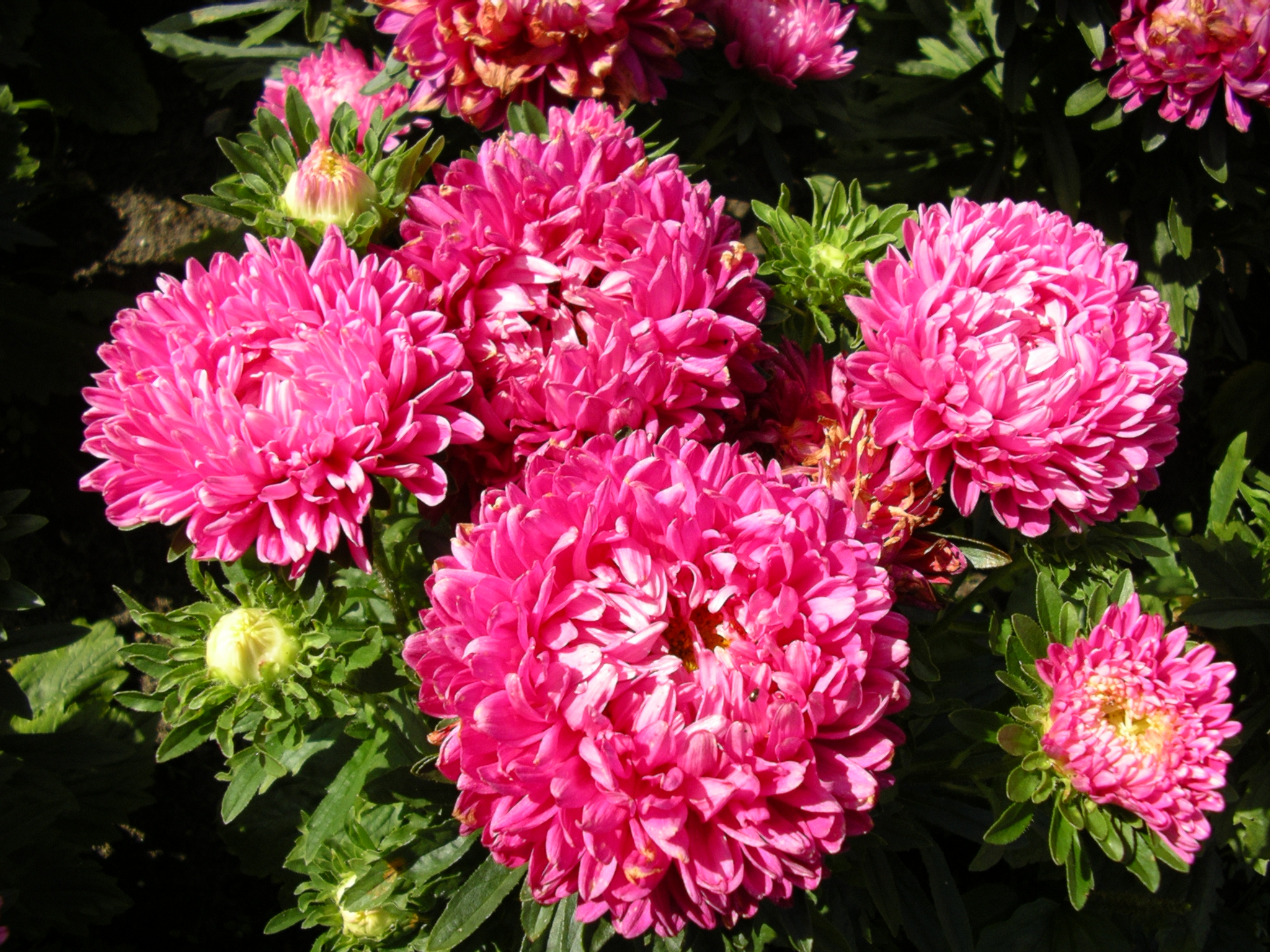
Purple flowers

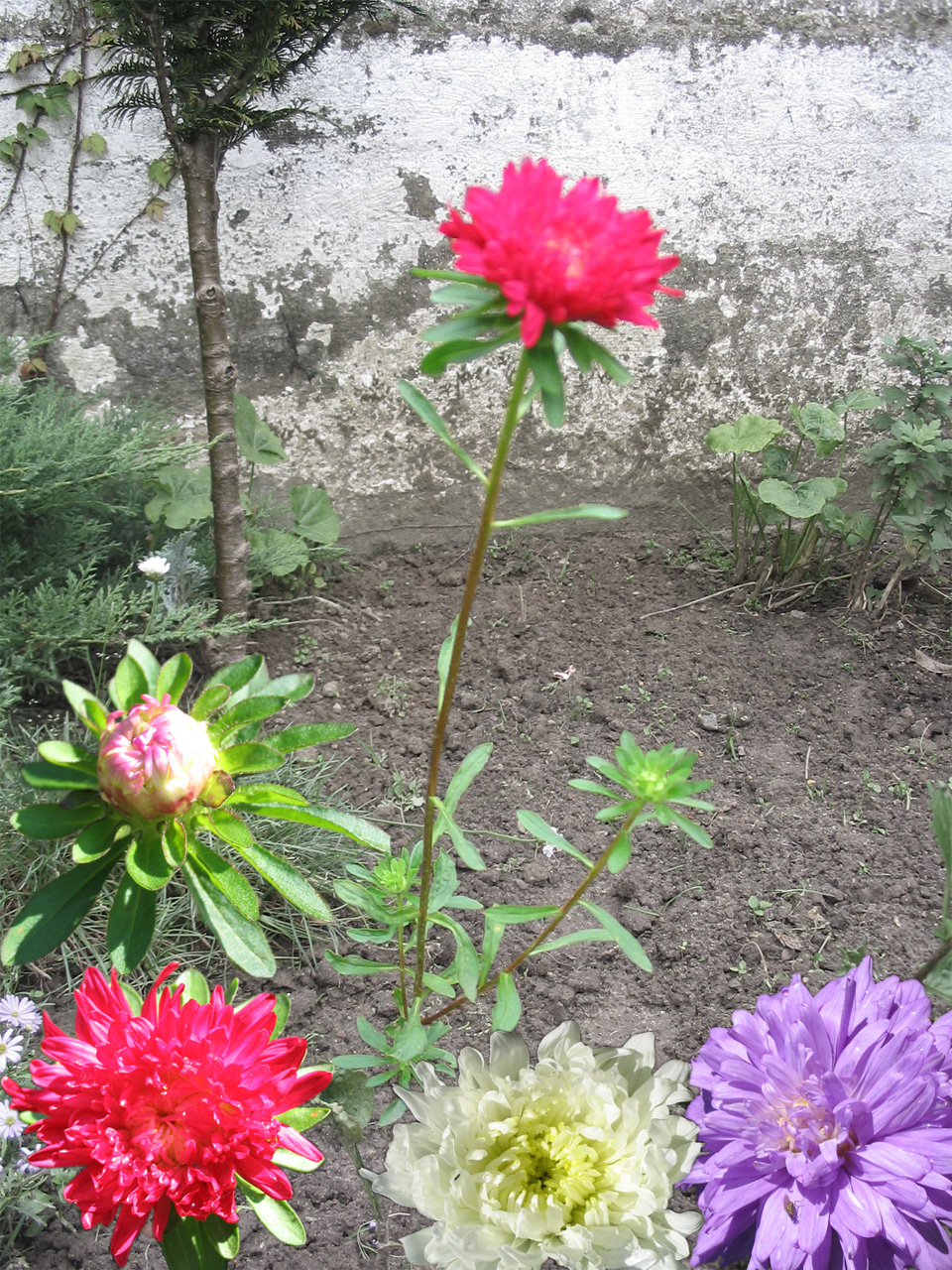
Mix colours

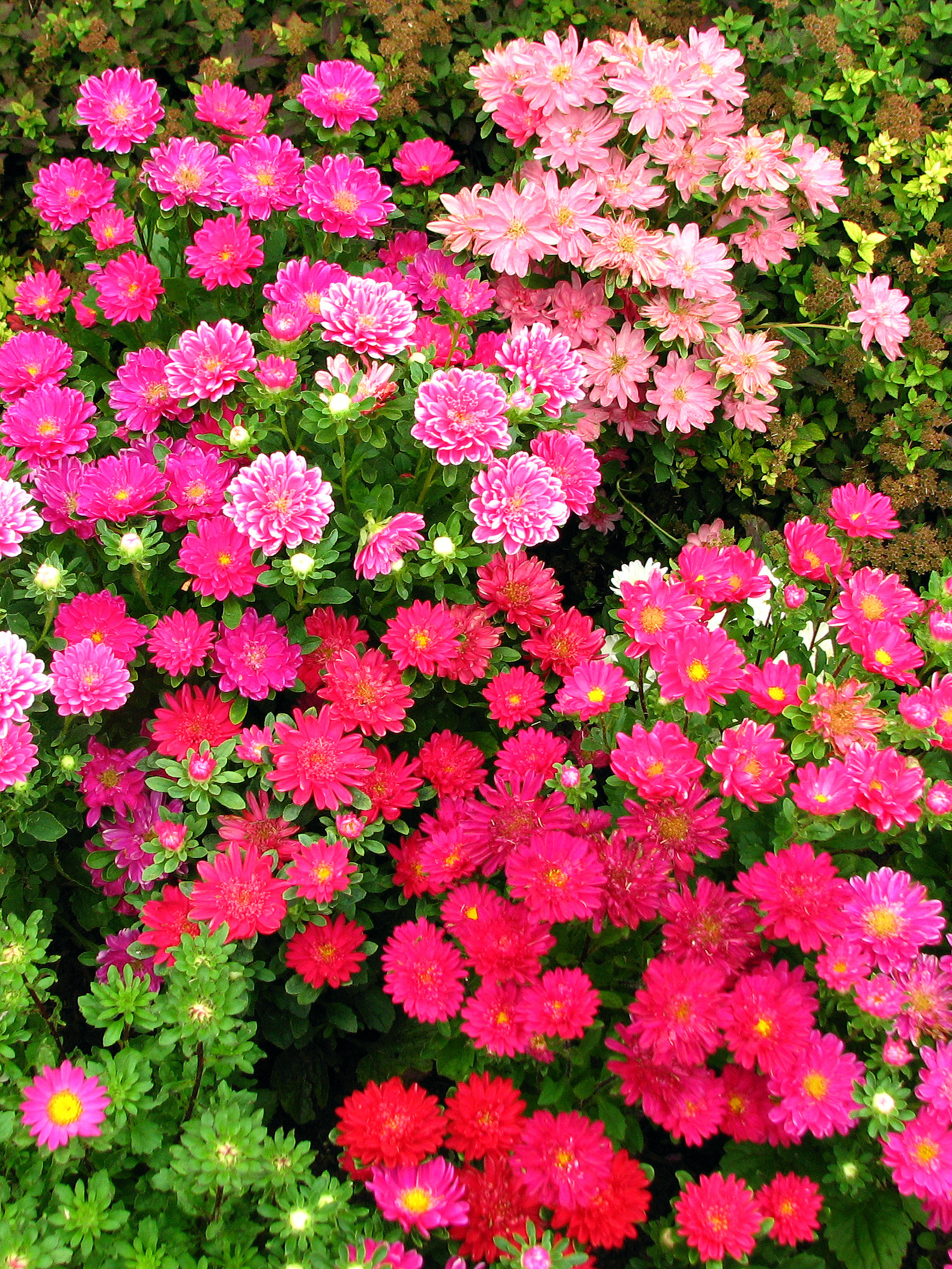
In a garden

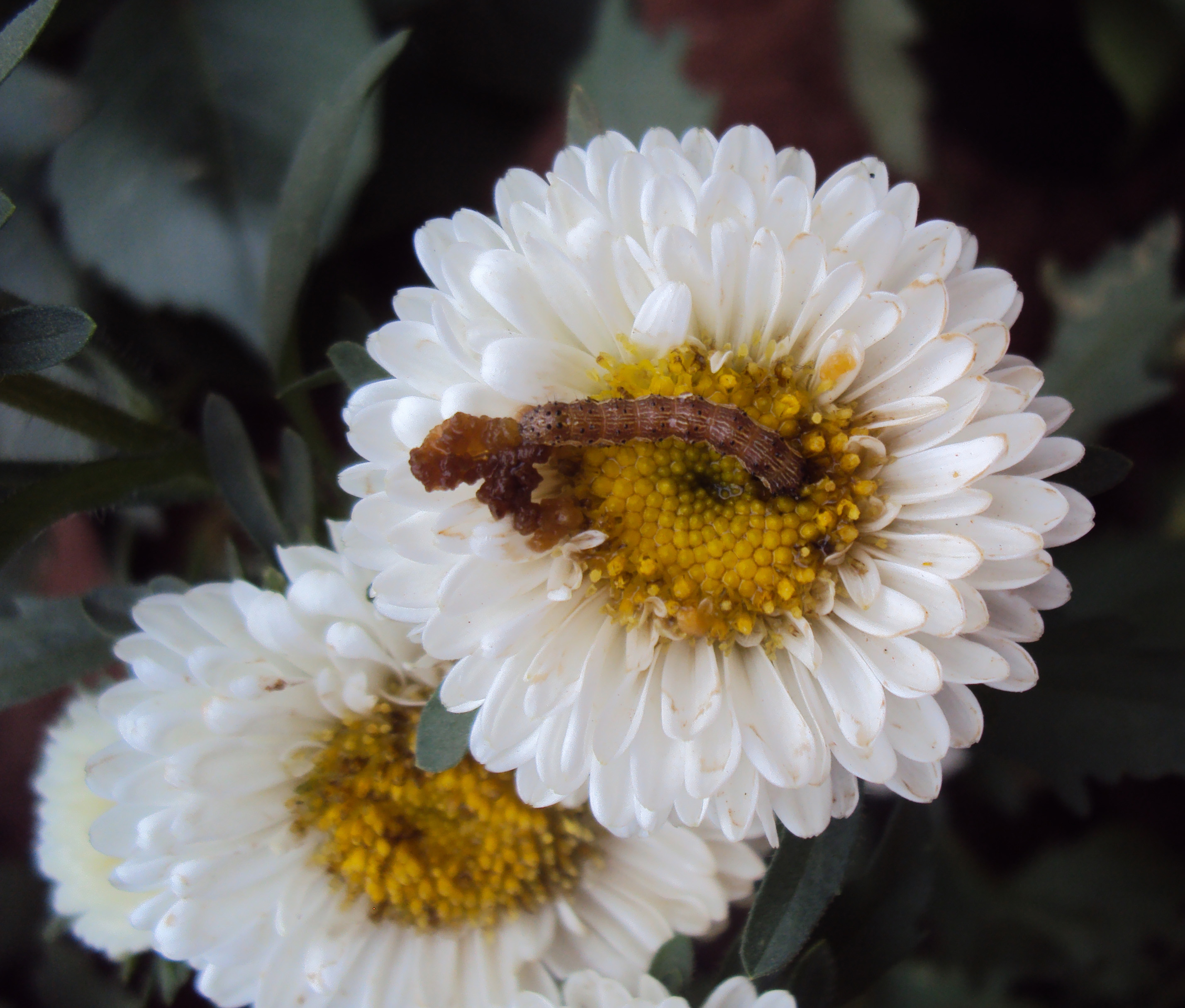
Caterpillar feeding on white flower

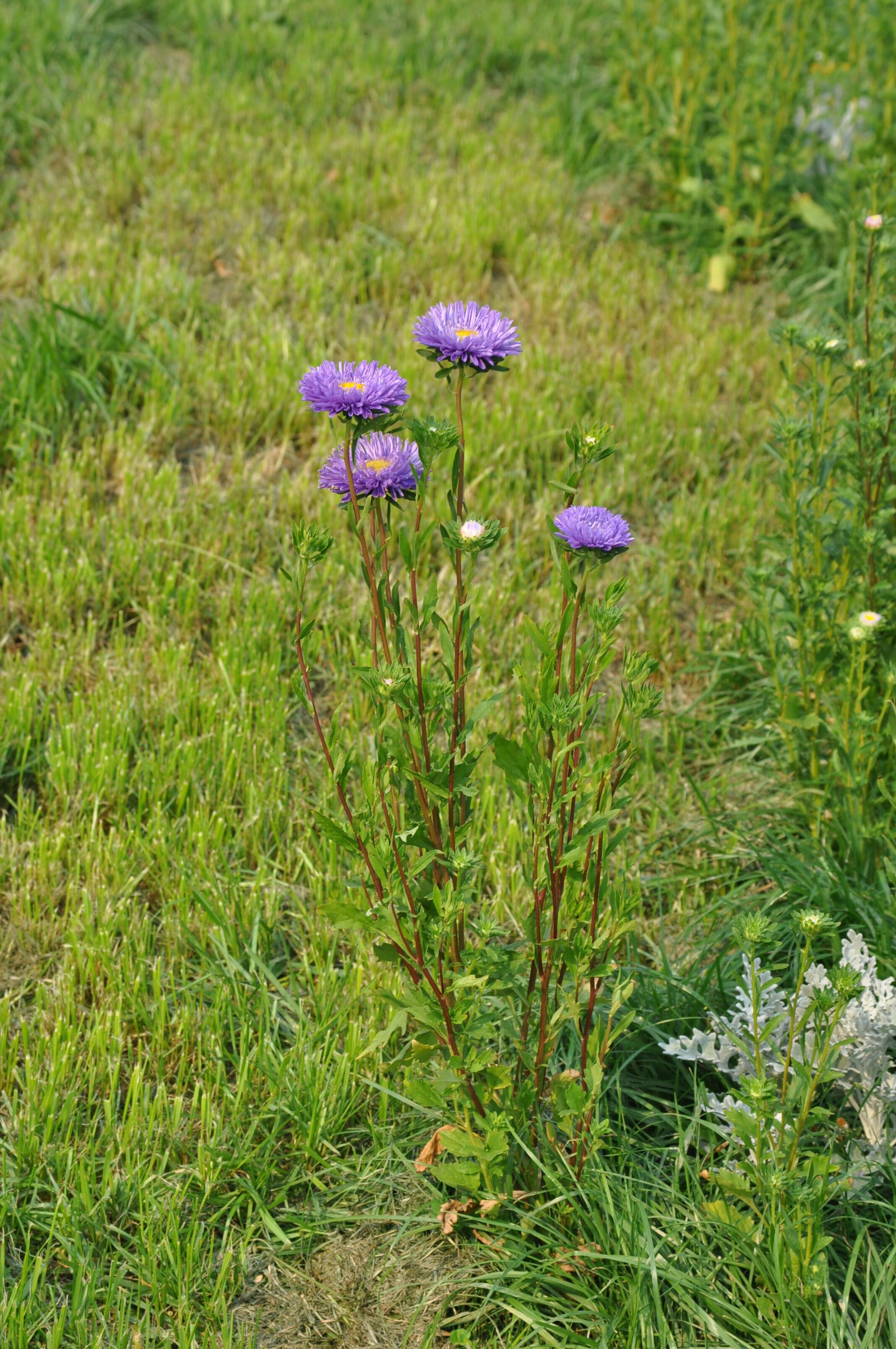
Natural habitat

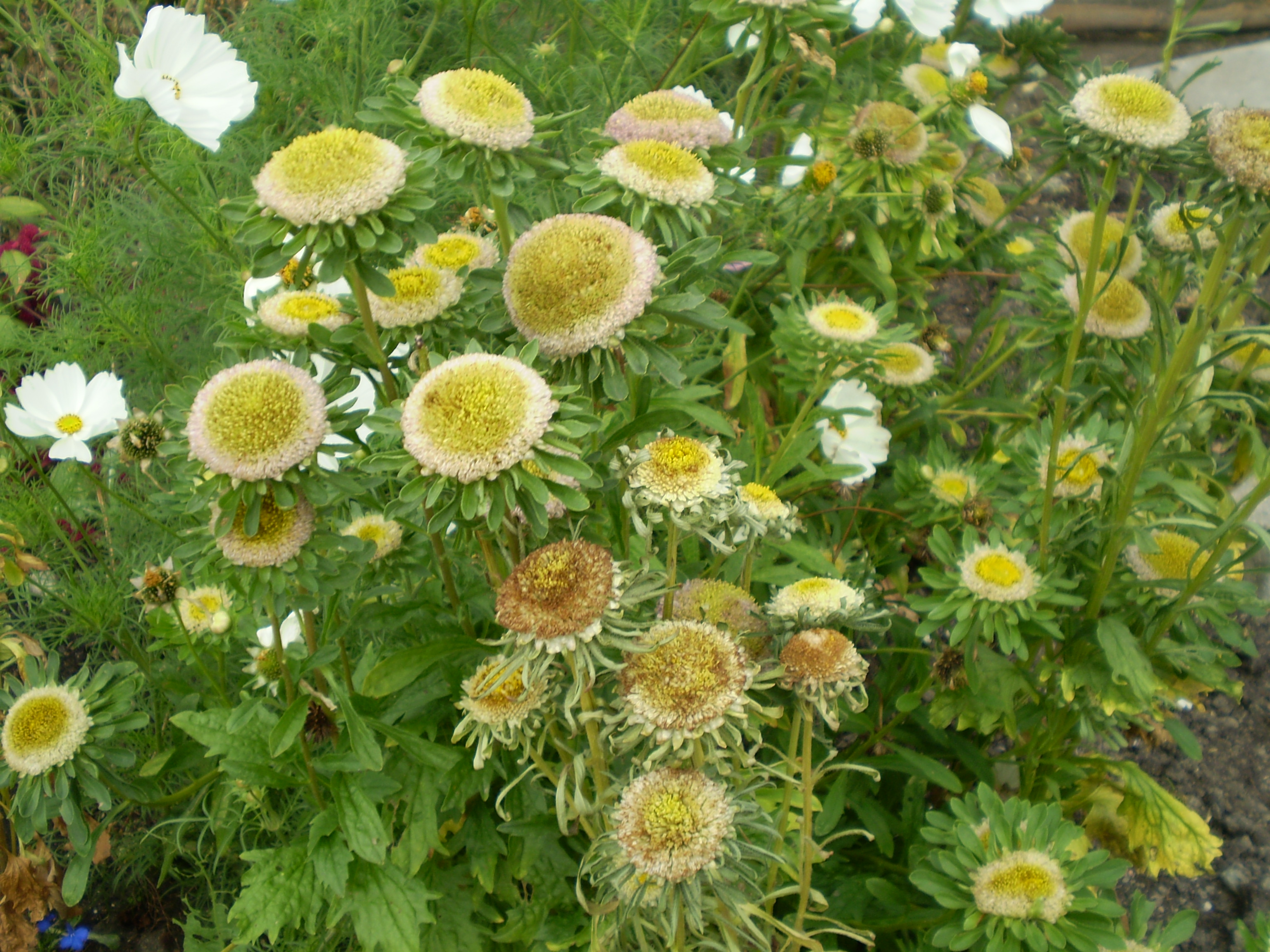
Garden setting

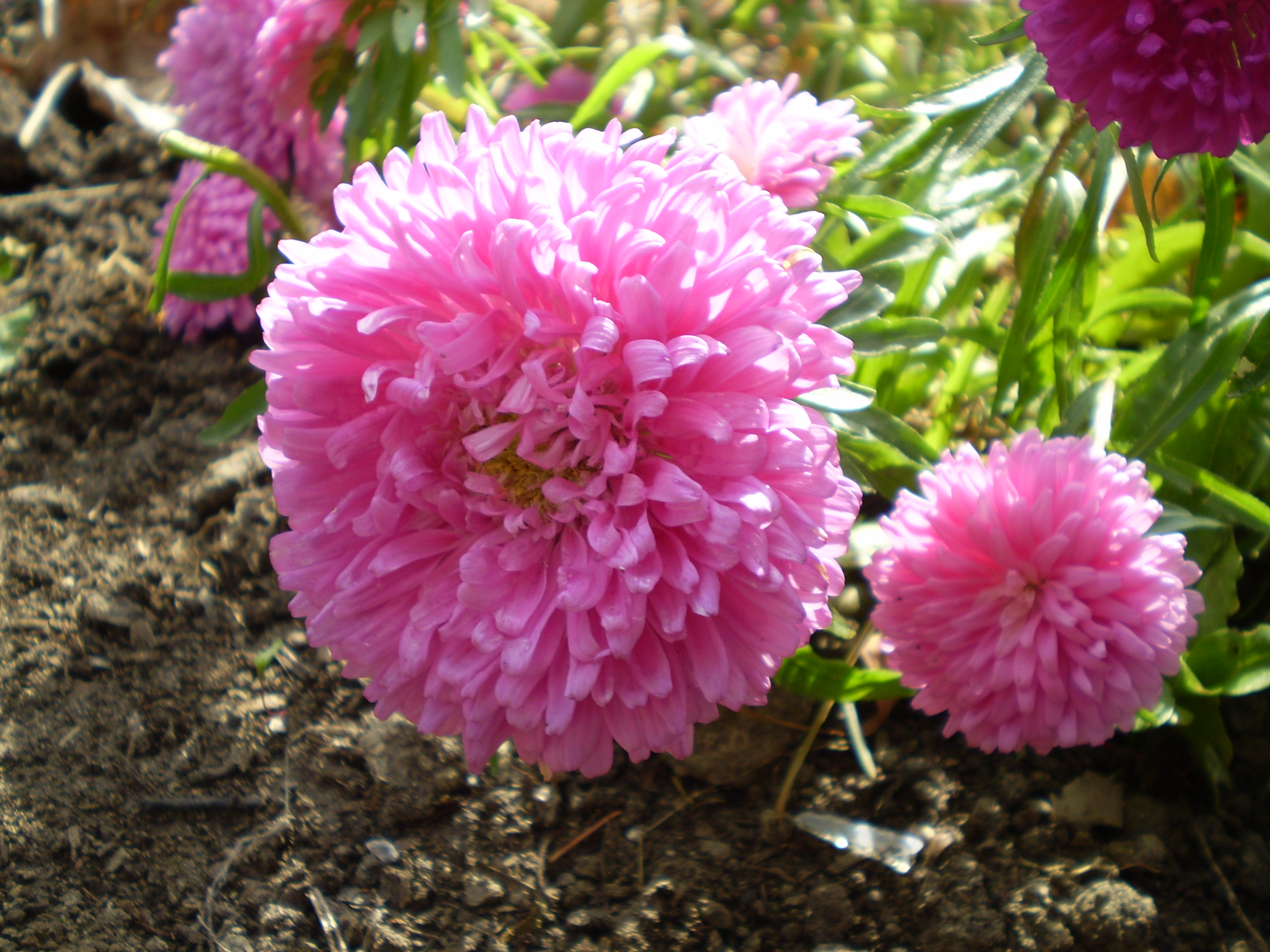
Round, fluffy flower

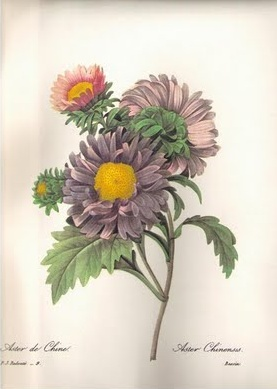
Aster de Chine (1833) by Pierre-Joseph Redouté

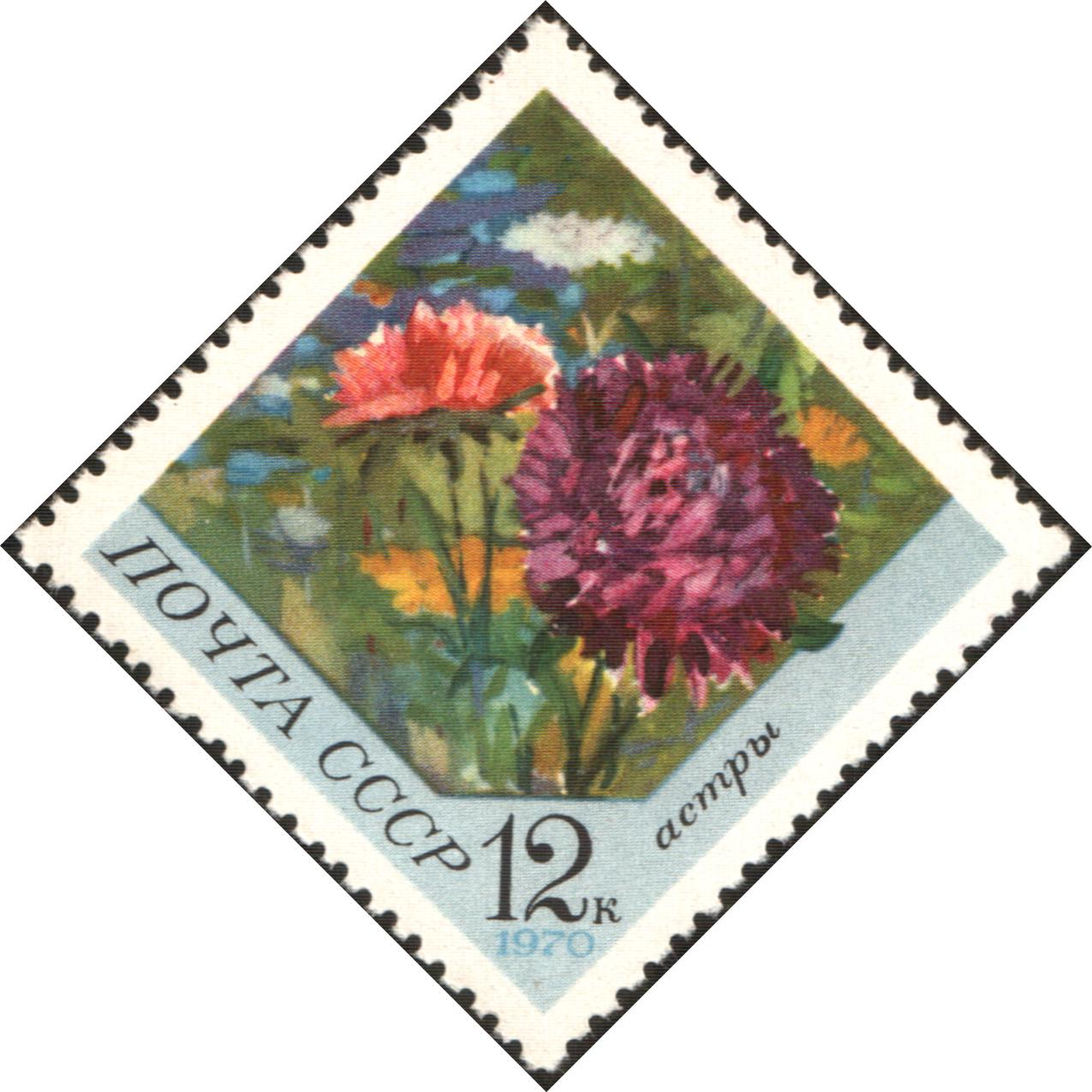
On a 1970 USSR postage stamp
