= Flora of China =

Collective plants of China

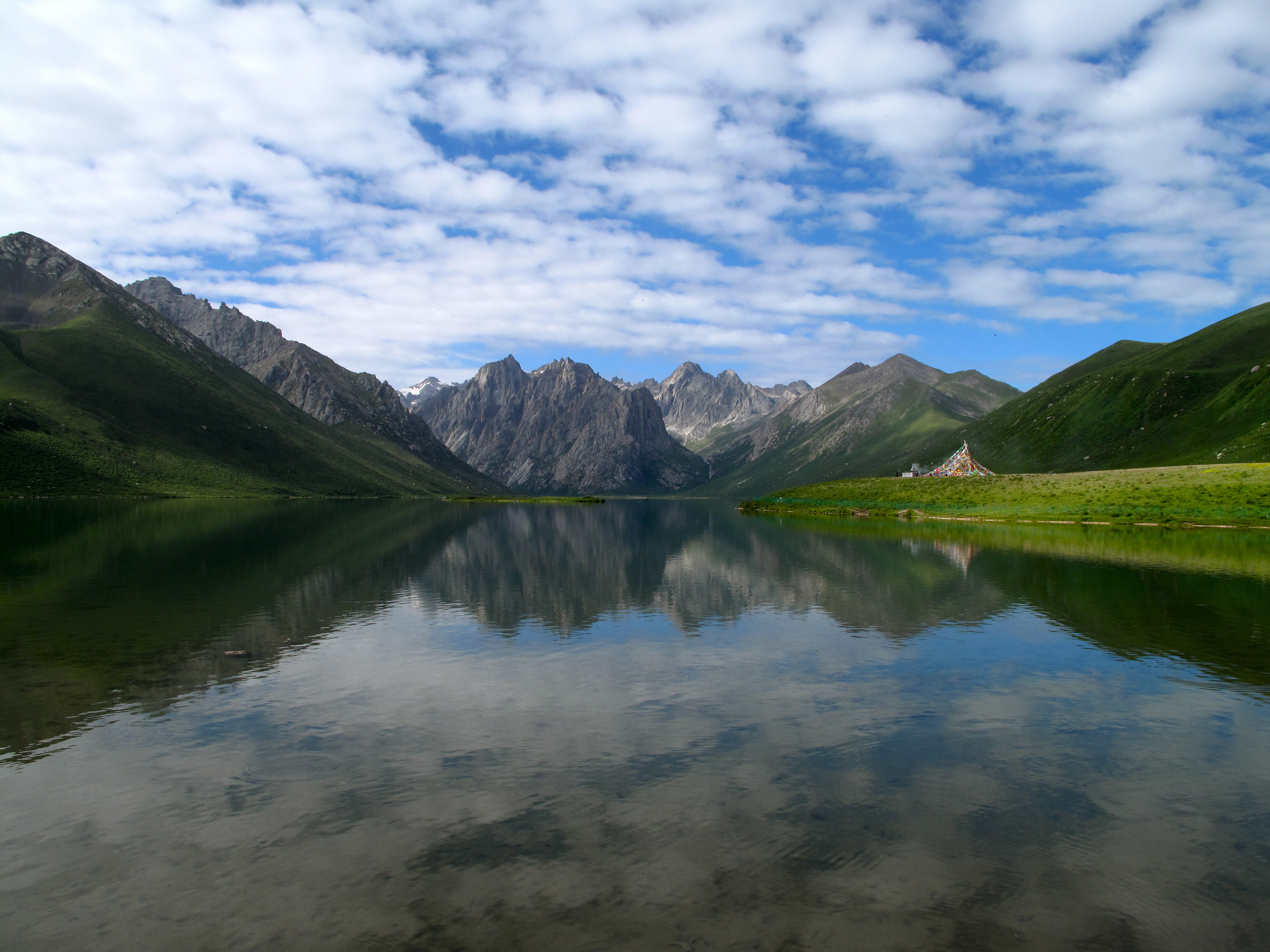
Overlooking Lake Ximencuo on the Tibetan Plateau

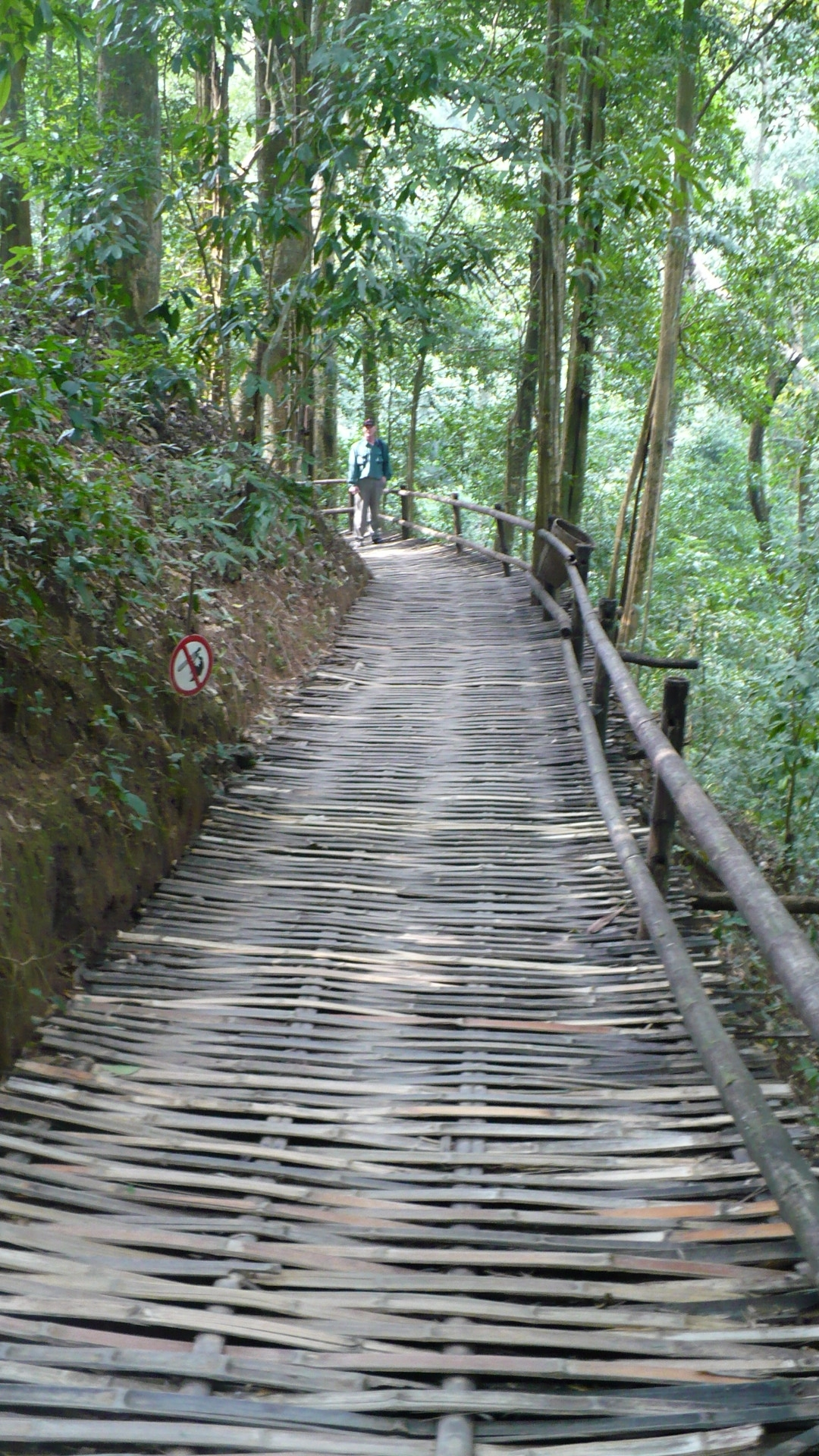
Xishuangbanna Primeval Forest Park

The flora of China consists of a diverse range of plant species including over 39,000 vascular plants, 27,000 species of fungi and 3000 species of bryophytes. More than 30,000 plant species are native to China, representing nearly one-eighth of the world's total plant species, including thousands found nowhere else on Earth. China's land, extending over 9.6 million km, contains a variety of ecosystems and climates for plants to grow in. Some of the main climates include shores, tropical and subtropical forests, deserts, elevated plateaus and mountains. The events of the continental drift and early Paleozoic Caledonian movement also play a part in creating climatic and geographical diversity resulting in high levels of endemic vascular flora. These landscapes provide different ecosystems and climates for plants to grow in, creating a wide variety of different flora spanning over not just China, but different parts of the world.

== Vascular plants ==
China has over 39,000 vascular plants, including angiosperms, gymnosperms, ferns (monilophytes) and fern allies (lycophytes). Approximately 31,500 of these being native and over 50% being endemic. The vascular plants of China have been documented extensively in the Flora of China.

=== Native species ===
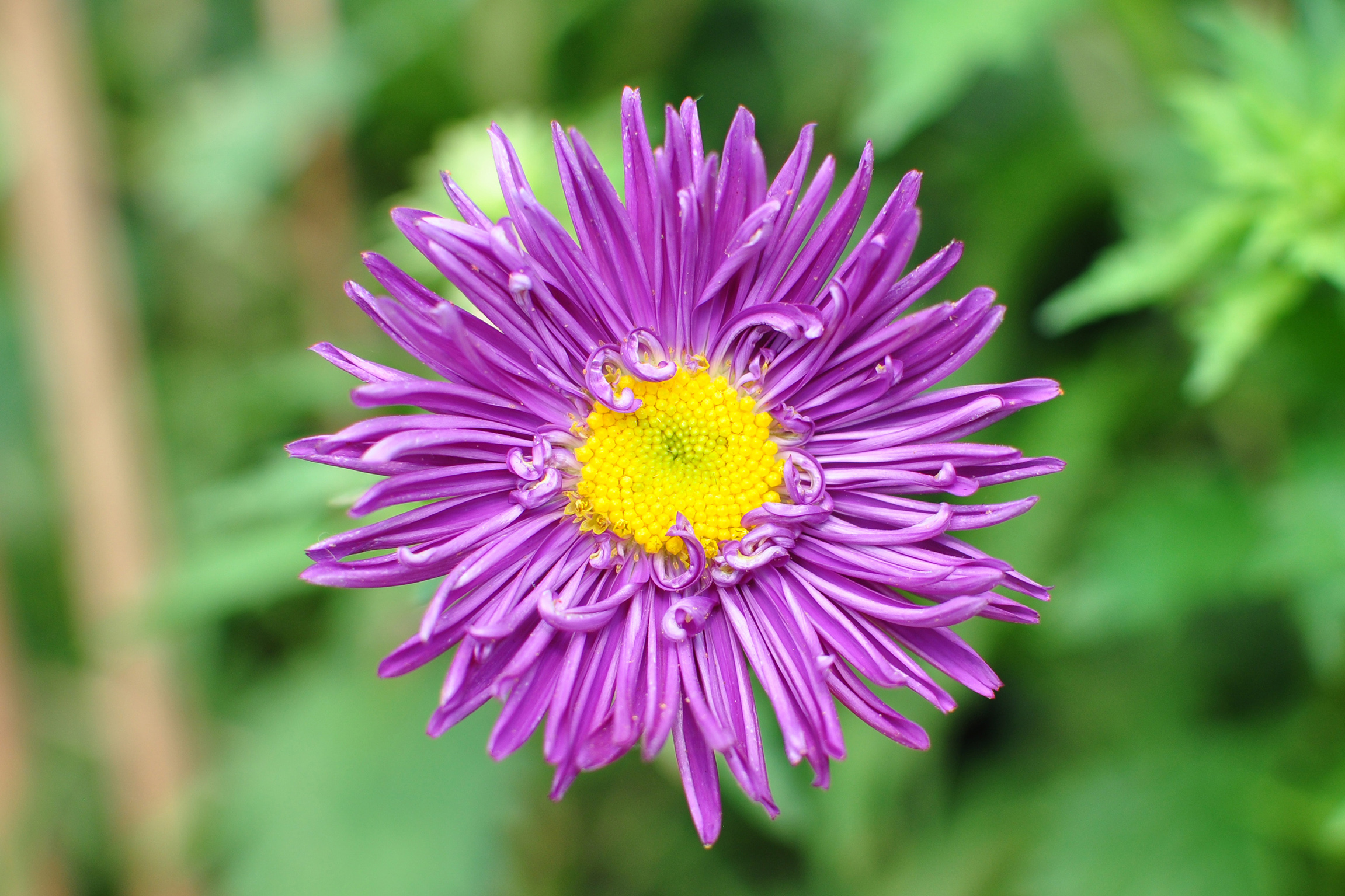
China Aster (Callistephus Chinensis)

Asteraceae is a well-known family containing many species that have been used in China for medicine as well as ornamental plants. Common species include the Callistephus, also known as the Chinese Aster, which is native to China.

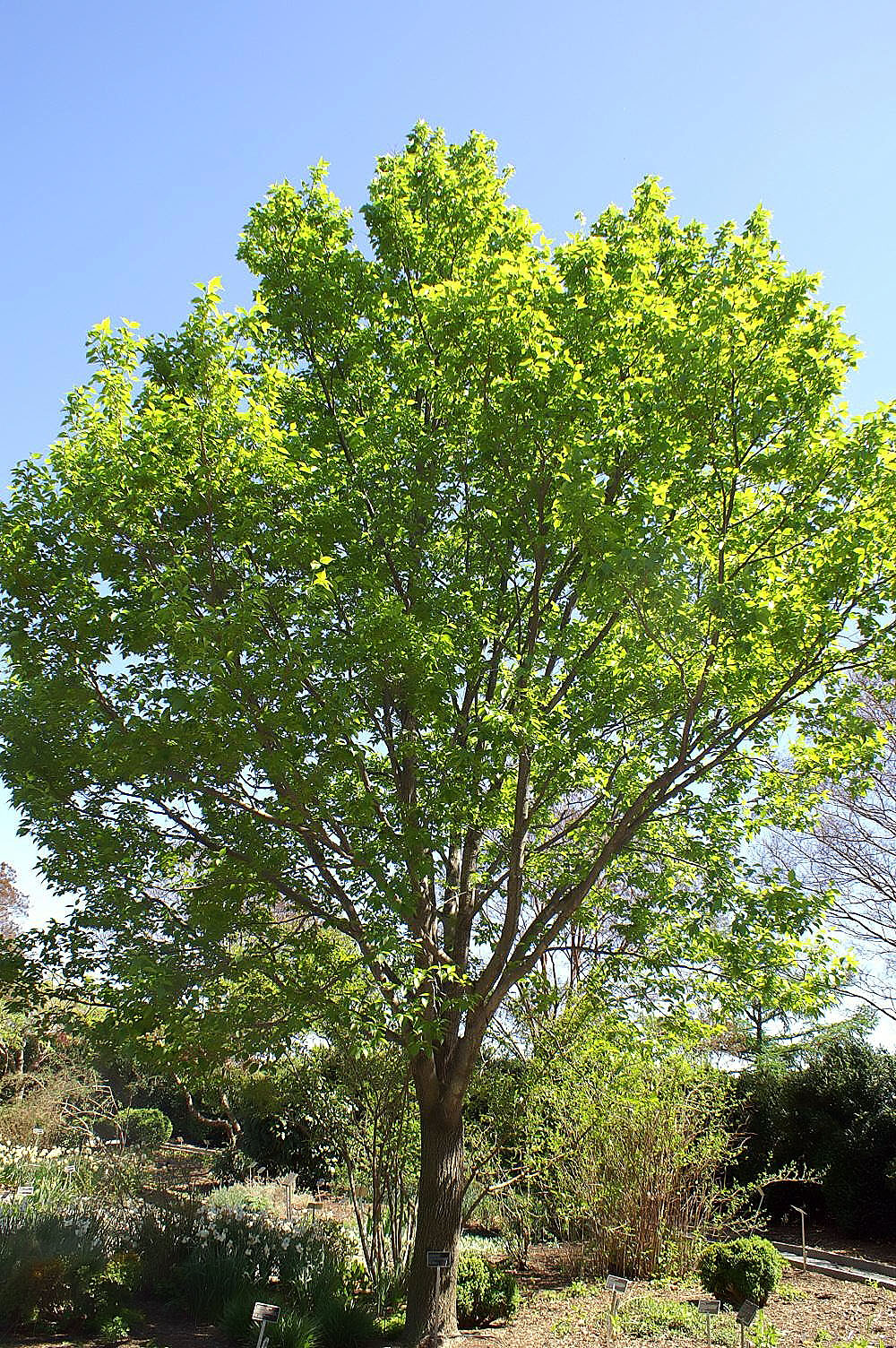
Gutta-Percha Tree (Eucommia ulmoides)

Dawn redwood (Metasequoia glyptostroboides) is a deciduous conifer native to the Luchuan country of the Hubei province in China. It is listed as a Class I rare and endangered tree in China, part of a genus thought to be extinct until a grove was discovered by botanists in 1948 in Central China. It is the only remaining species of Metasequoia with only approximately 5000 individuals left in the wild.

Gutta-percha tree (Eucommia ulmoides) is a small tree that has alternately arranged, deciduous leaves and is almost threatened in the wild. However, it is widely cultivated by the people of China for its bark which has medicinal properties. It is also important in China's natural rubber producing industry as its leaf produces a latex compound when torn which dries into rubber.

Happy tree (Camptotheca acuminate) is a low-growing deciduous tree native to the warm, humid river banks along the Yangtze River. The leaves, bark, roots, and seeds have medicinal properties that have been used to treat the common cold, liver problems, digestive problems, and psoriasis in the past.

Yunnan cypress (Cupressus duclouxiana) is an endemic coniferous tree species that occur in the low altitude regions of Central China. This species is threatened by habitat loss and is listed as endangered on the IUCN Red List of Threatened Species.

Other native plants include golden larch (Pseudolarix kaempferi), dove-tree (Davidia involucrata), China fir (Cunninghamia lanceolate), Fujian Cypress (Fokienia hodginsii), Tienchi Ginseng (Panax notoginseng) and Lycium chinense.

== Fungi ==
The fungal flora of China is extensive with over 27,000 fungal species. As of 2018, China has reported 1789 edible fungi and 798 medicinal fungi. Notably, fungi played a vital part of China's traditional native plant use, with recent archaeology findings determining its significance in regions of China around 6000 years ago and dating as far back as the Tang dynasty (600–900 ce). Consequently, its significance in Chinese herbal medicine, culture, and cuisine broadened their understanding of the plant, resulting in our more intricate knowledge of fungi. The use of Chinese fungi was first documented in an ancient Chinese book dating to the second century, entitled Shen Nong Ben Cao Jing (The Divine Farmer's Materia Medica), which references 14 different types of fungi used among a total of 365 herbal medicines.

The fungal records from the Checklist of Fungi in China and the Flora Fungorum Sinicorum series reveal that the distribution of fungi in China is uneven, particularly in Northwest China. Northwest China includes the provinces of Xinjiang, Qinghai, Gansu, Ningxia, and Shaanxi making up over 30% of the country's territory, however, only 3887 species of fungi out of 759 genera have been yielded there. In comparison, the tropical regions of South-Central China and Southwest China, which includes the provinces of Hainan, Guangdong, Guangxi, and Yunnan, account for less than 5% of the country's territory but have yielded 5,056 species in 1192 general. However, there is a difference in the precipitation levels in both areas and these climatic and geographical conditions may possibly be a reason for the fungal diversity in the two regions.

Mushroom cultivation plays a major role in the ecological and social development of China. According to the State of World's fungi report 2018, over 100 species of fungi have been domesticated for cultivation with around 60% being produced commercially. It not only provides food but also income and around 25 million jobs. China has become one of the largest edible mushroom producers in the world reaching an estimated annual yield of over 38 million tonnes.

== Vegetation types ==
=== Forests ===
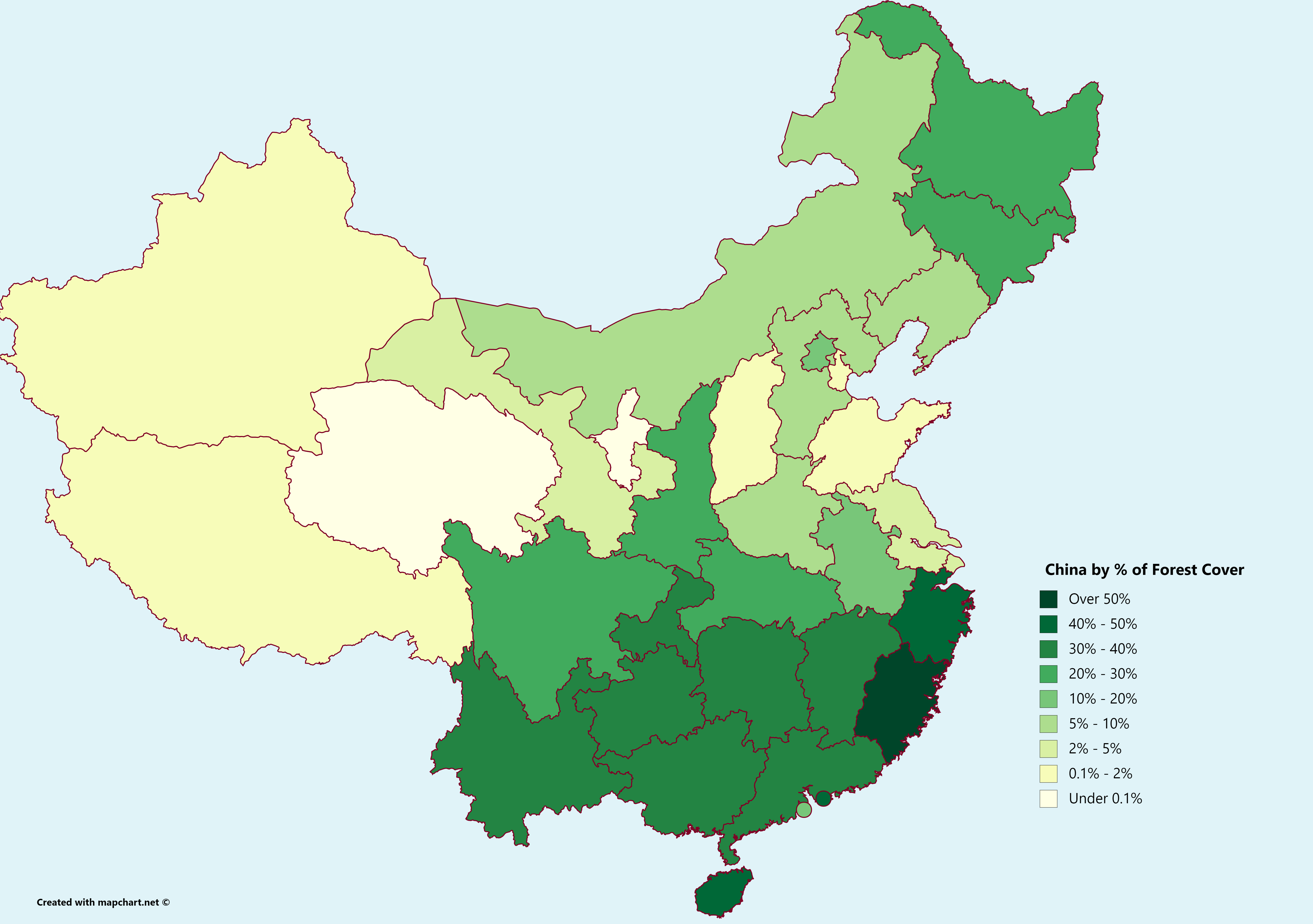
Forest cover percentages over divisions of China

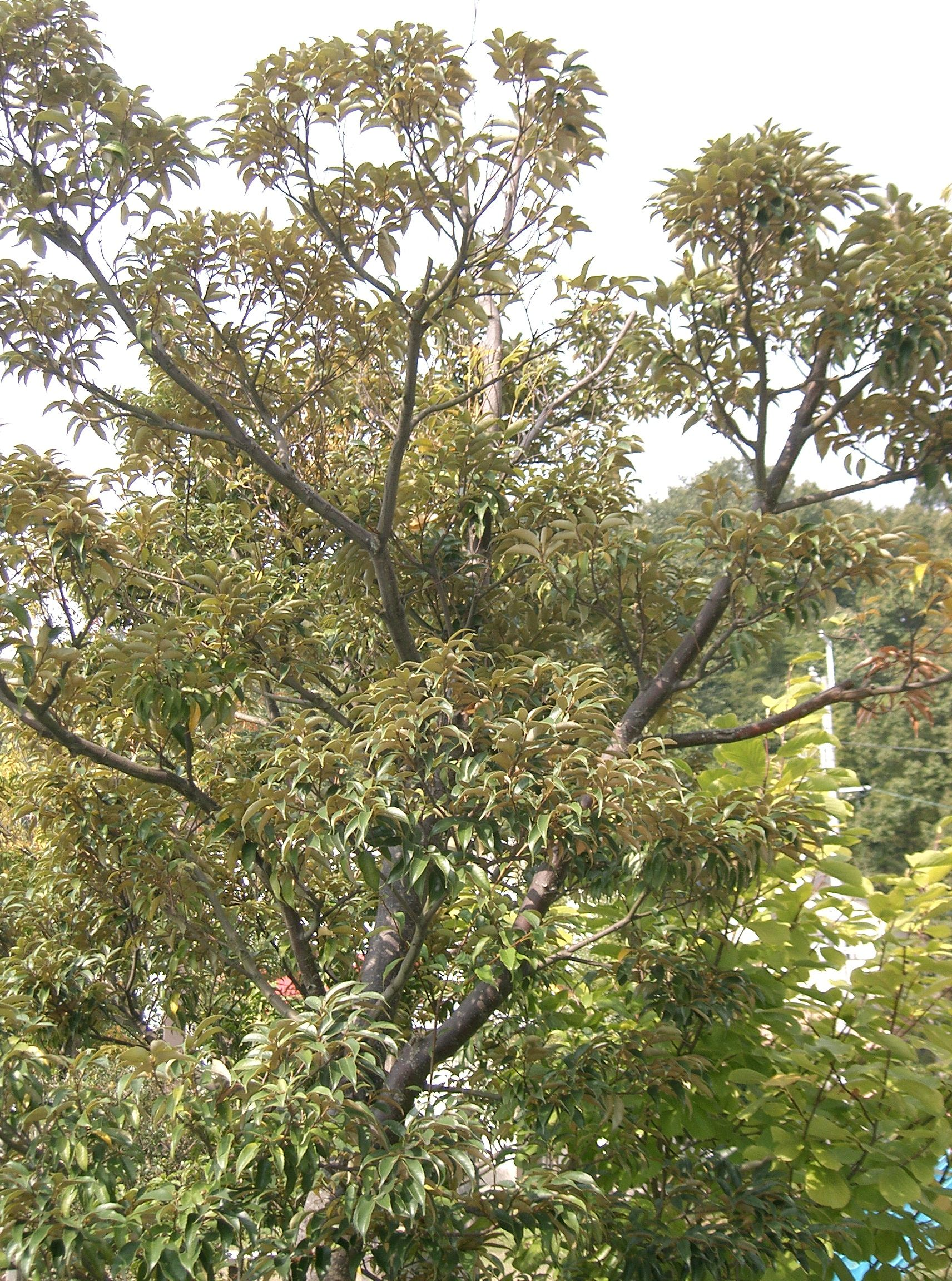
Castanopsis sieboldii

There are six forest regions in China. This includes the North, Northeast, Northwest, South Central, Southeast, and Southwest. Both northeast and northwest reaches contain mountains and cold coniferous forests, supporting animal species which include moose and Asiatic black bear, along with some 120 types of birds. Moist conifer forests can have thickets of bamboo as an understorey, replaced by rhododendrons in higher montane stands of juniper and yew. Northeast China contains one of the major forest regions in China. The cold-temperate deciduous needle-leaved forest region is located in northernmost Northeast China. This region is also composed of the long, narrow ranges of gneiss and granite which form the Eastern margin of the Mongolian Plateau. Deciduous conifer forests, also known as light taiga forests, are the zonal vegetation in this region. In this region, you can also find dwarf forests, Picea jezoensis forests, Betula dahurica forests, and more. Temperate mixed forest regions make up the largest forest region in Northeast China. The climate in this region is milder and moister allowing mixed forests of evergreen coniferous and deciduous broad-leaved trees to dominate. Pinus koraiensis are the main species of this forest, however, several other evergreen coniferous tree species can be found in the forests such as Abies holophylla. These forests are important in China for timber production but also house the Panax ginseng, which is a valuable medicinal plant.

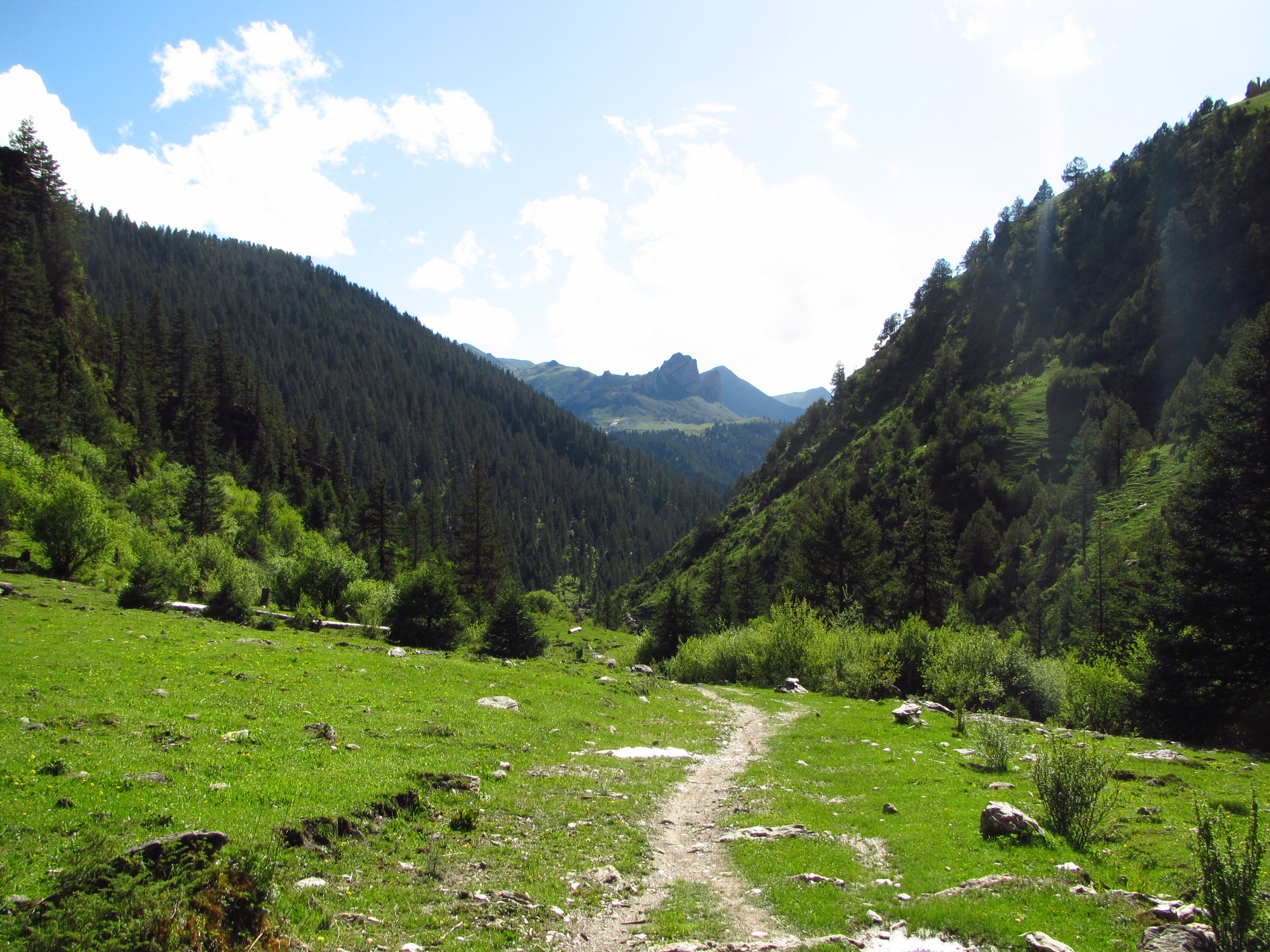
Conifer forest in Dêgê County, Hengduan

Subtropical forests, which dominate central and southern China, support an astounding 146,000 species of flora. South China experiences heavy rainfall and long wet seasons, making the climate ideal for bamboo and rice growth. North China by contrast experiences limited rainfall and far less species diversification than the south (Kressey, George, 1930). Tropical rainforest and seasonal rainforests, though confined to Yunnan and Hainan Island, contain a quarter of all the plant and animal species found in China. The Southwest forest region is made up of Tibet, Yunan, Guizhou, Sichuan, and Chongqing. This region contains a number of valuable ancient and relict trees such as Ginkgo biloba, which is a distinctive paleoendemic species originating from the Permian Era of the Paleozoic. The Chinese landscape has undergone geographical shifts creating some of the most vital habitats in the world. The topography of China changed when tectonic plate shifts developed the uplift of the Himalaya Mountains and the Tibetan plateau. A result of changing topography changed the climate of inner China resulting in the deserts of the Xinjing region and the dry climate of the north and northwest China (Marks, R. 2017). China's biodiversity today can be linked back to 13,000 years ago marking the end of a global ice age. A large portion of China was not covered with the same layer of ice as Eurasia and North America, allowing species prior to the ice age to survive well past the freezing period (Marks, R. 2017). The Southwest forest region is an important glacial refuge supporting high diversity as it was not majorly affected by the last ice sheet. This allowed species that originated from the Mesozoic to the Early Tertiary, such as Amentotaxus argoenia, Podocarpus spp and Dacrydium pierrei, to continue growing. There are four representative subtropical broad-leaved forests of Southwest China; the semi-humid forest, monsoon forest, mid-montane forest, and typical broad-leaved forest. Cyclobalanopsis, Castanopsis, and Lithocarpus are some of the species which dominate the four types of forests. Other species that dominate the monsoon forest include Machilus, Beilschmiedia, Cryptocarya (Lauraceae) and Schima (Theaceae). Machilus and Schima are also found in mid-montane forests as well as Cinnamomum, Manglietia, and Alcimandra. The humid evergreen forests are also dominated by different species of Lauraceae, Magnoliaceae, Theaceae, Elaeocarpaceae.

== Use by humans ==
Over 10,000 of the species have been implemented in at least one of the fields with a vast majority in medicine. Nowadays, Chinese plants have been exported all around the world to be studied or used for food or used in the medicinal system. The Chinese originated medicinal plant Artemisia annua, also known as sweet wormwood, is one of the most well known medicinal plants to come from China, having been used since ancient times to treat fevers as well as a possible treatment for malaria in the 1970s. Poaceae, also known as grasses, are a very economically important group with around 1795 species (809 being endemic) in China. Species from this family such as Phyllostachys heteroclada, which was one of the more popular bamboos, were used to weave everyday objects such as bamboo mats as well as children's toys.

Plants have also played a large role in China's history and culture having been symbolically used in art, architecture and religion. Different plants can be interpreted differently depending on their characteristics. Plants can be symbolically used through either association or through puns of the Chinese characters of the plant's name. The paeonia (paeony) is one of the most popular botanical images in Chinese culture with its beauty symbolising wealth, honor and rank.

Research exhibits data that tells us the number of useful plants that are endemic, threatened, or both such as how 3,552 (33%) of useful plants are endemic to China with 1,353 of those having been included in at least one list of globally threatened species. This includes the IUCN (International Union for Conservation of Nature) and CITES (the Convention on International Trade in Endangered Species of Wild Fauna and Flora).

== Conservation and threat ==
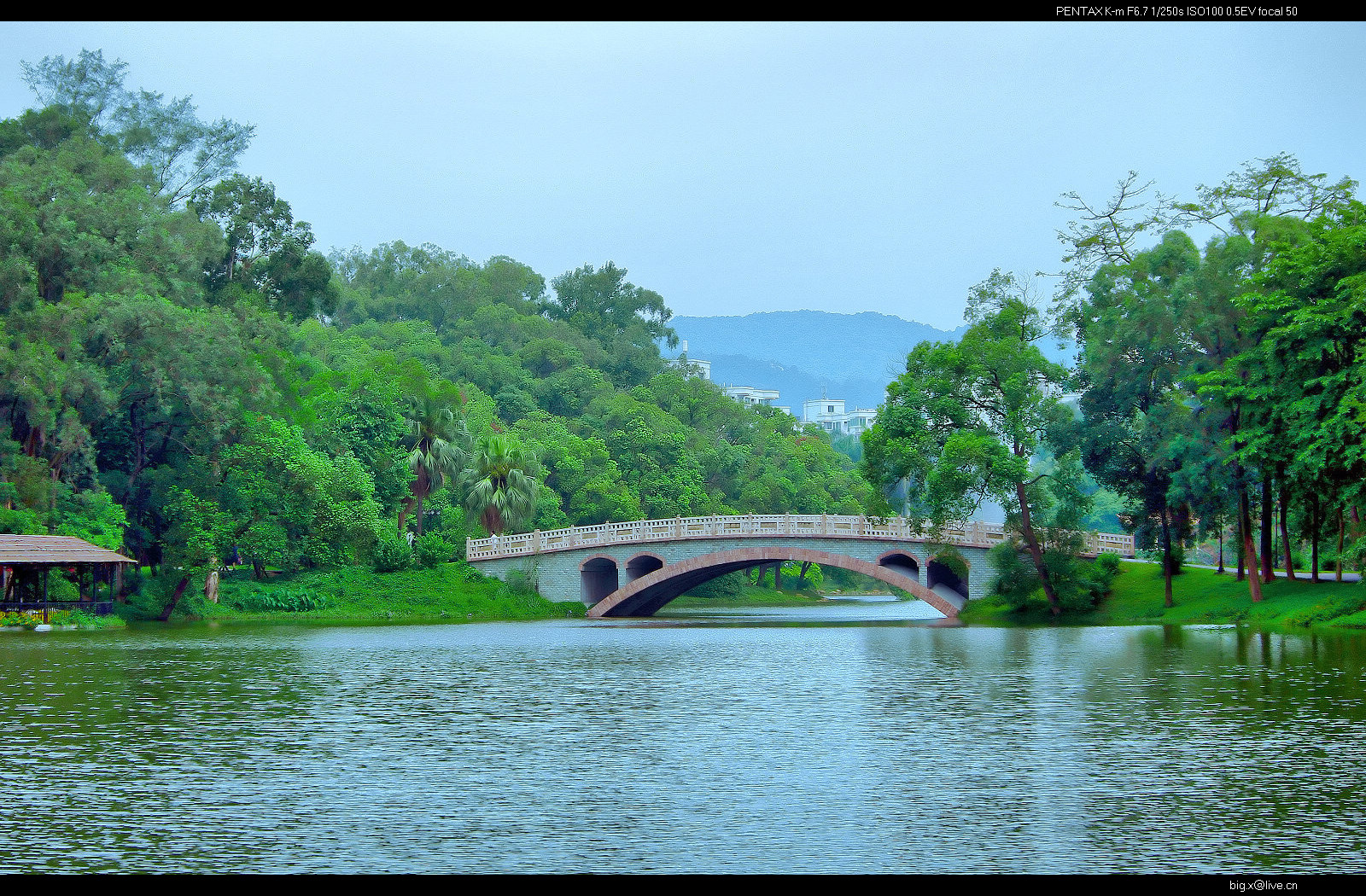
South China Botanical Garden

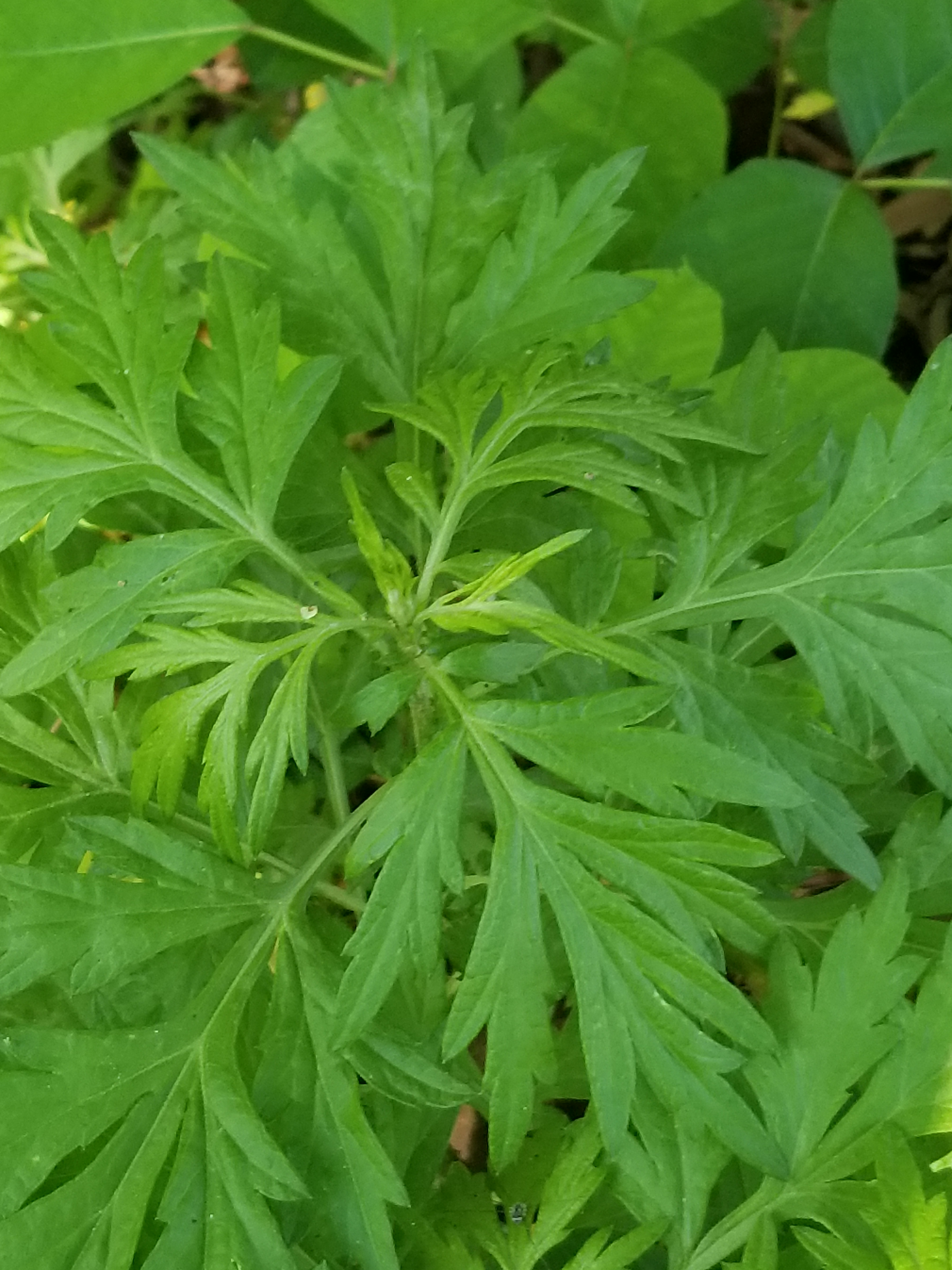
Ragweed (Ambrosia artemisiifolia)

The arrival of humans has caused a disturbance and had a great impact on the evolution of plants in China. The introduction of factors such as climate change and pollution has impacted the climatic and geographical location and diversity of plants. Fungi being less recorded in Central and Eastern China where there is more agricultural and industrial development and habitat destruction can be seen as an example of this. Recently, it has been reported that Fritillaria delavayi, a small high in demand flower located in Southwest China, has been evolving to camouflage with its environment to avoid getting picked. This plant has been used for medicinal purposes for the last 2000 years but demand has steadily started to increase, resulting in the flower developing grey and brown leaves to blend in with its rocky surrounding.

=== Conservation ===
In early 2002, China endorsed the Global Strategy for Plant Conservation providing an approach for preserving the estimated 300,000 to 425,000 species of vascular plants in in situ and ex situ preservation. In response to this, The Chinese Academy of Sciences (CAS) established an ex situ conservation program to help efficiently manage the ex situ conservation of indigenous plants in China. Their 12 botanical garden institutions serve as conservation, research as well as public education and with the program, they planned to create five regional gardens, establish nine specialized ones as well as acquire and renovate 15 existing ones. The five regions on which new gardens would be established were the temperate and plain forest of North China; the Yangtze River regional aquatic flora (east-central China); the subtropical monsoon evergreen broadleaved forest (South China); tropical rainforest (southwest China); and the south-central China Henduan mountain flora. In 2008, China's Strategy for Plant Conservation was adopted as a joint initiative of the Chinese Academy of Sciences, the National Forestry and Grassland Administration, and the Ministry of Ecology and Environment. More than 3000 nature reserves have been created, covering approximately 16% of China's land surface. This includes more than 85% of types of terrestrial natural ecosystems, 40% of types of natural wetlands, 20% of native forests, and 65% of natural communities of vascular plants.

=== Invasive species ===
China has a long history of intentional and non-intentional introduction of invasive species. Invasive species are widespread in the country representing many major taxonomic groups. The rapid growth of China's economy, trade and transportation systems provide increased opportunities for the introduction of invasive species. With their dense population, areas that are more populated tend to have a larger number of invasive plants. China has attempted to combat the problematic alien species through enhanced awareness, developing a database of invasive species, monitory as well as other methods.

Ceratocystis fimbriata and ragweed (Ambrosia spp.) are two particular invasive species causing an economic loss in agriculture. Ragweed is a threat to public health as well as the ecological integrity of China, affecting the production of farming and animal husbandry. Alligator weed (Alternanthera philoxeroides) is another invasive species particularly affecting forestry. Other damaging and widespread species in China include amaranth (Amaranthus spp.), Crofton weed (Eupatorium adenophorum), and spinyflower alternanthera (alternanthera pungens).
