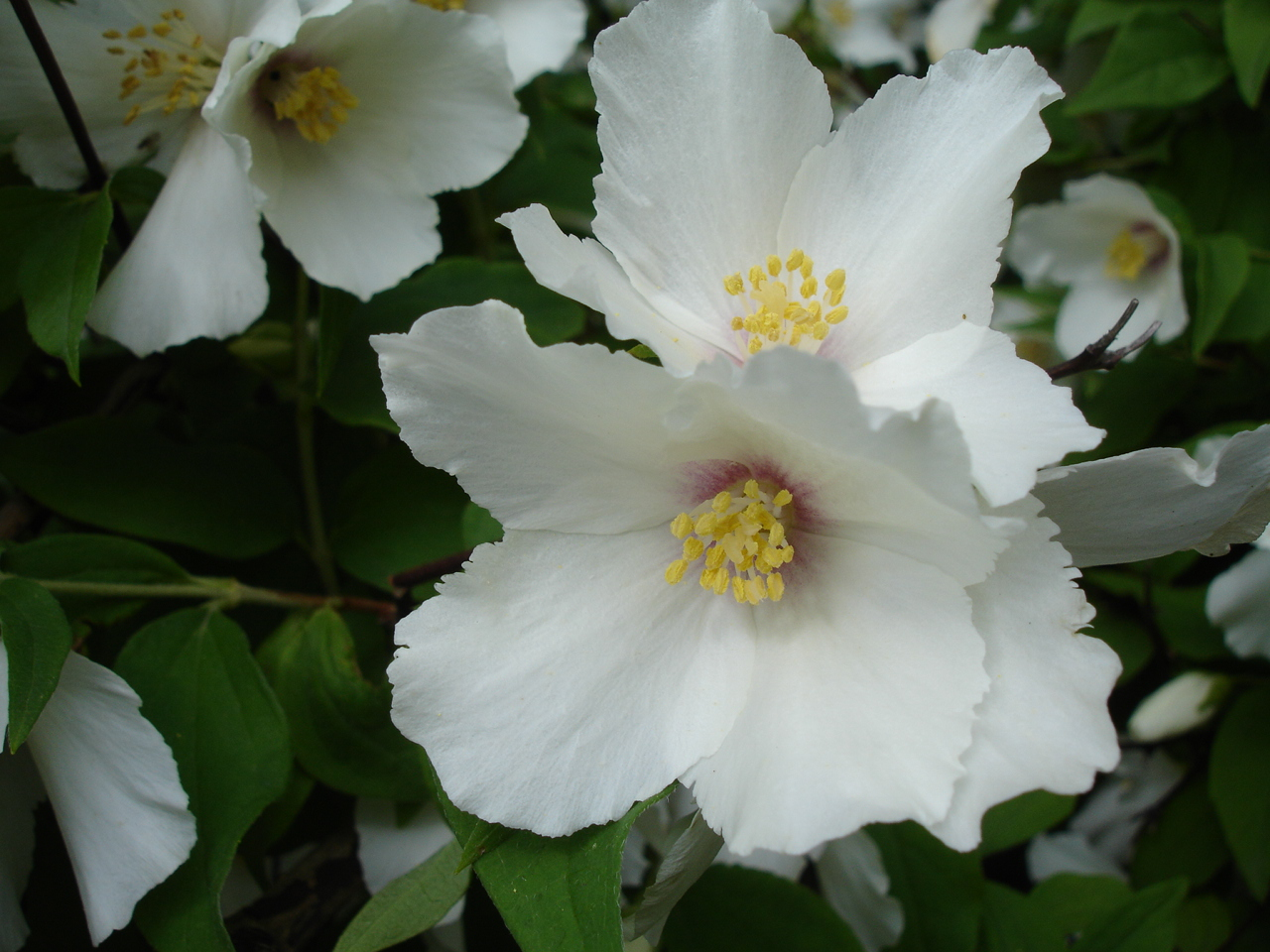

Scientific classification
- Kingdom: Plantae
- Clade: Tracheophytes
- Clade: Angiosperms
- Clade: Eudicots
- Clade: Asterids
- Order: Cornales
- Family: Hydrangeaceae
- Genus: Philadelphus
- Species: P. × purpureomaculatus

Binomial name
- Philadelphus × purpureomaculatus Lemoine

= Philadelphus × purpureomaculatus =

Species of flowering plant

Philadelphus × purpureomaculatus is a flowering plant in the family Hydrangeaceae, of garden origin. It is a hybrid between Philadelphus × lemoinei and P. mexicanus 'Rose Syringa'. Growing to 1.2 m (4 ft) tall by 2 m (7 ft) broad, it is a deciduous shrub with broadly oval leaves up to 5 cm (2 in) long, and single, cup-shaped flowers in summer (June in the Northern Hemisphere). The flowers, which are often strongly fragrant, are pure white with prominent purple markings near the centre; hence the Latin specific epithet purpureomaculatus, literally "purple spotted".

Valued in the garden as a summer-flowering shrub, the cultivars 'Sybille' and 'Belle Etoile' have gained the Royal Horticultural Society's Award of Garden Merit.
