= Pipe tree =

Pipe tree is a common name for several plants used in making pipe stems and may refer to:

- Philadelphus
- Syringa

== See also ==
- Pudding pipe tree
