= Philadelphus incanus =

Scientific classification
- Kingdom: Plantae
- Clade: Tracheophytes
- Clade: Angiosperms
- Clade: Eudicots
- Clade: Asterids
- Order: Cornales
- Family: Hydrangeaceae
- Genus: Philadelphus
- Species: P. incanus

Binomial name
- Philadelphus incanus Koehne

Species of shrub

Philadelphus incanus, the hairy mock orange, is a deciduous shrub in the genus Philadelphus. Native to China, it is a medium to large shrub characterised by its hairy leaves and later flowering than other members of the genus.
