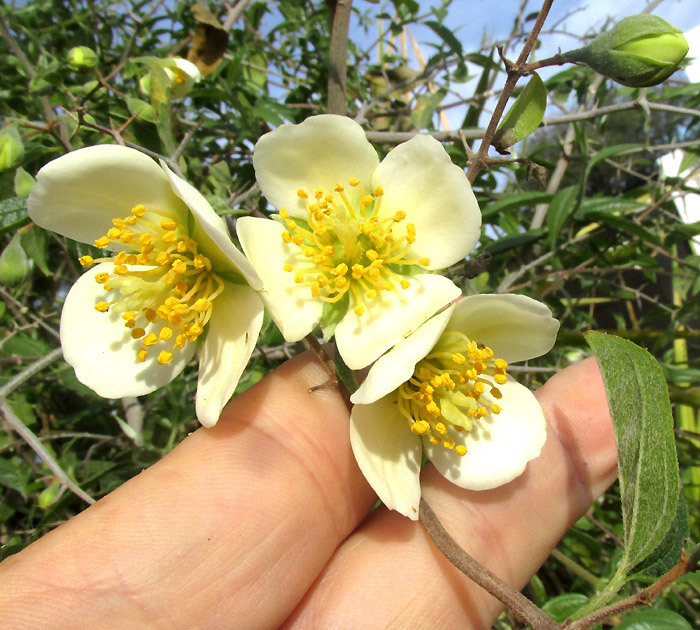
- Flowers

Scientific classification
- Kingdom: Plantae
- Clade: Tracheophytes
- Clade: Angiosperms
- Clade: Eudicots
- Clade: Asterids
- Order: Cornales
- Family: Hydrangeaceae
- Genus: Philadelphus
- Species: P. coulteri

Binomial name
- Philadelphus coulteri S.Watson

Synonyms
- Philadelphus mexicanus var. coulteri (S.Watson) Bean; Philadelphus osmanthus S.Y.Hu; Philadelphus purpusii Brandegee

= Philadelphus coulteri =

Species of grass

Philadelphus coulteri, often known as Coulter's mock orange, belongs to the hydrangea family, the Hydrangeaceae.

== Description ==
Numerous cultivated hybrids sold as Coulter's mock orange may have features differing from this description of the naturally occurring species.

In its native area, Philadelphus coulteri is a shrub up to 10 m (about 33 ft) tall, whose many slender, almost climbing, stems and leaves are densely hairy. The leaves arise opposite one another on slender, often drooping or hanging, rusty-colored stems. Oval to narrowly oval (lanceolate) leaf blades display three dominant veins arising from the base. The blades' margins are almost without teeth or indentations, though a few tiny, widely separated teeth may appear. The blade undersurfaces are paler than the upper, though both surfaces are densely to sparsely hairy. The hairs are stiff and incline toward the surface to varying degrees, and denser on leaf undersurfaces than on the upper.

The flowers are fragrant, yellowish-white, sometimes with a reddish spot in the center; they appear singly on the stem, or arranged in 3-flowered clusters. The flowers' pedicels are up to 3 mm long (about 1/8 inch). The sepals are ovate, sometimes narrowly so, up to 8 mm long (about 1/3 inch), with a sharp tip. The pedicels, hypanthium, and calyx lobes bear dense, soft, silvery-white hairs. The white corollas are up to 3 cm in diameter (about 1 3/16 inch), with spreading, rounded to ovate petals with rounded tips. Stamens number 30 to 38; styles are up to 4 mm long. The capsular-type fruits are oval, with the broadest part at their tops, up to 1 cm long (about 13/32 inch), woody, and crowned with persisting sepals. The brown seeds, up to 5 mm long (3/16 inch), are slender, almost cylindrical, but narrowing to tail-like appendages.

== Taxonomy ==
The taxon Philadelphus coulteri was first published by Sereno Watson, a US botanist, in 1887. The type specimen is documented as collected in "Zimapan" by "Dr. Coulter", his #77. It is known that the Irish botanist Thomas Coulter managed a mine in the Zimapán, Hidalgo, Mexico area in the mid 1800s.

Within the hydrangea family, Philadelphus coulteri resides in one of the two tribes of the subfamily Hydrangeoideae, the tribe Philadelpheae. The Phiadelphaeae mainly is composed of two genera: Philadelphus and Deutzia. So far, the phylogenetic relationship and evolutionary history of these genera have not been well resolved.

== Etymology ==
The genus name Philadelphus, on uncertain grounds, my have been chosen to honor Ptolemy Philadelphus, King of Ptolemaic Egypt (309-246 BCE).

The species name coulteri was named after Thomas Coulter, an Irish physician, botanist and explorer, who in the mid 1800s collected many Mexican plants until then not known to science. In the original scientific description of the species, it is seen that Coulter collected the species in the vicinity of Zimapán, the state of Hidalgo, Mexico. That publication does not make clear which Coulter did the collecting, but it is known that the Irish botanist Thomas Coulter was in charge of a mine in the Zimapán region up to 1829.

== Distribution and habitat ==
Philadelphus coulteri occurs from mountainous areas of central and southern Mexico south into Guatemala.

In its native environment, Coulter's mock orange occurs on calcareous soils in mountainous temperate climates. It iss found in oak forests, mixed pine-oak forests, and in mountainous mesophile forests at an elevation of 1700-2800 m (about 6700ft-9200 ft). It flowers from March to August.

== In cultivation ==
Philadelphus coulteri is admired by gardeners for its dense, green color and fairly large, fragrant blossoms, which attract bees, butterflies and birds. In the UK, it is not widely cultivated, and under cultivation often is confused with similar species, such as Philadelphus pringlei. The distinguishing features of Philadelphus coulteri are the dense, silvery hairiness on the leaves, and its large, "flat flowers" with roundish, overlapping petals.

Hybrid plants grown in British gardens as a form of Philadelphus mexicanus, with a pinkish or purplish blotch at the petals' bases, are said to be derived from Philadelphus coulteri. Note that the name Philadelphus mexicanus var. coulteri is regarded as a synonym of Philadelphus coulteri.

== Gallery ==
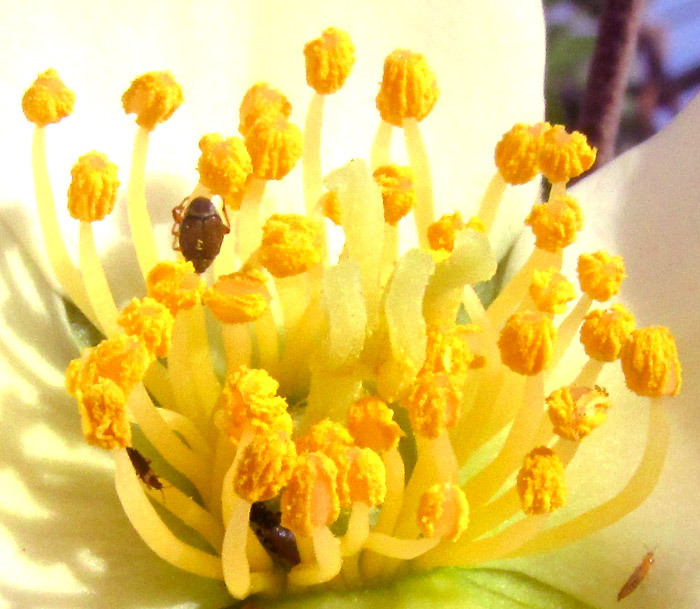
Stamens and branched style

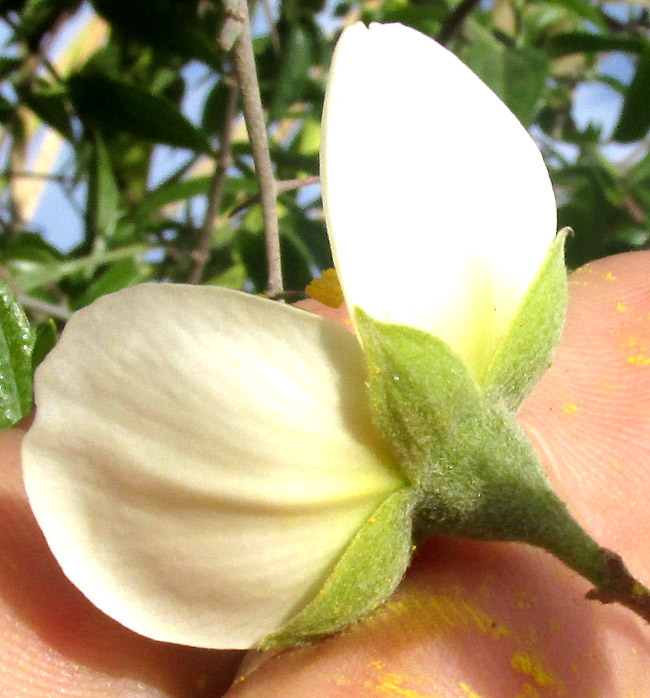
Sepals and hypanthium

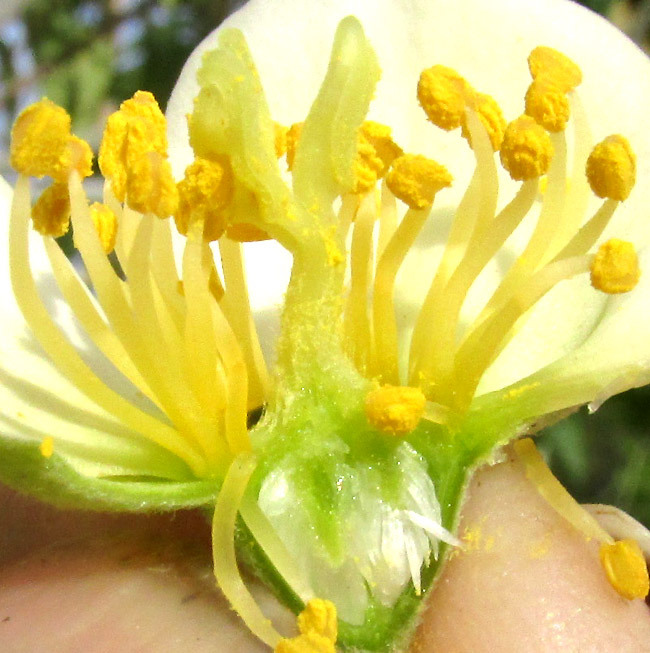
Dissected flower

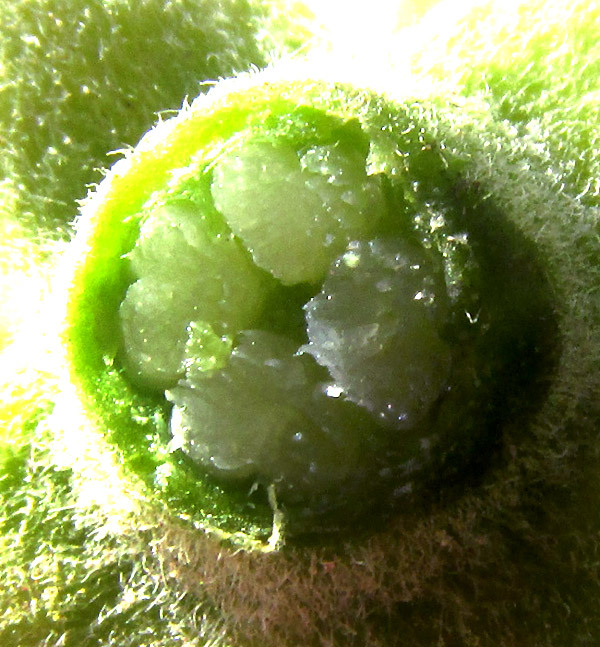
Dissected ovary with immature seeds

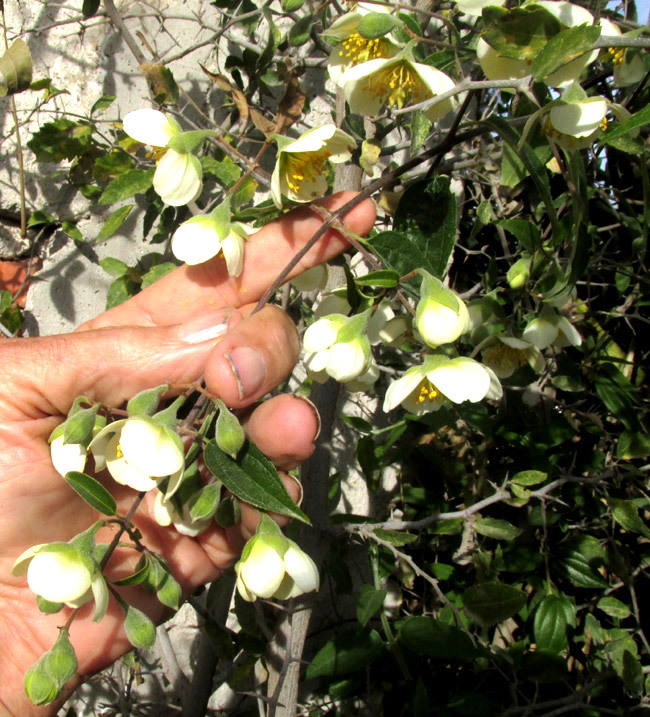
Flowering branch

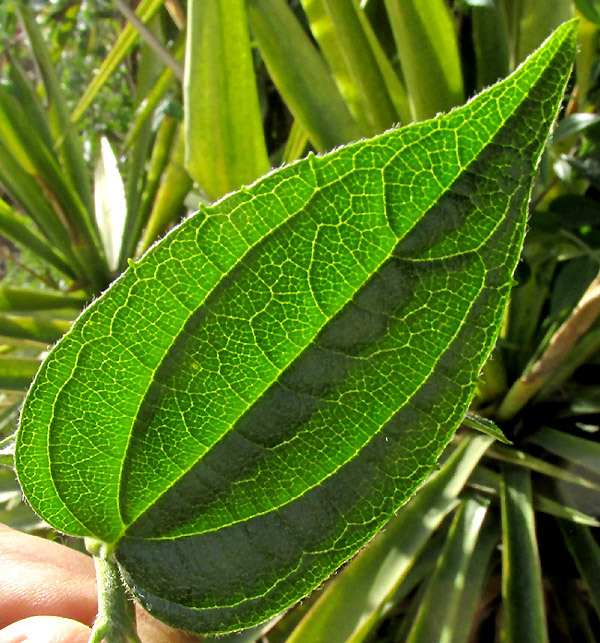
Leaf venation

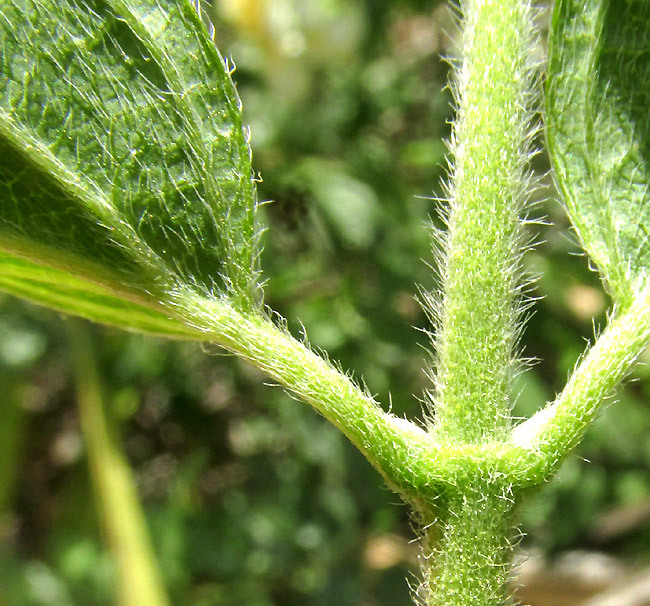
Silvery-hairy leaf undersurface, petioles and stem

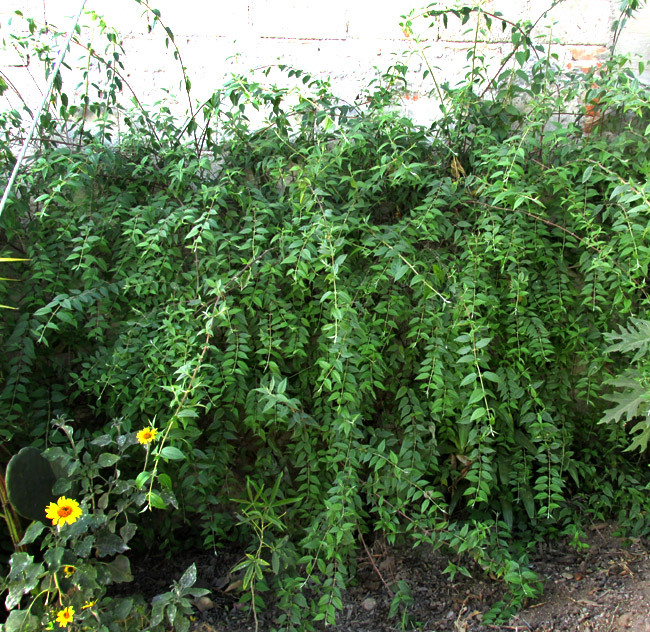
Bush among weeds at base of a cinderblock wall at the edge of a Mexican village
