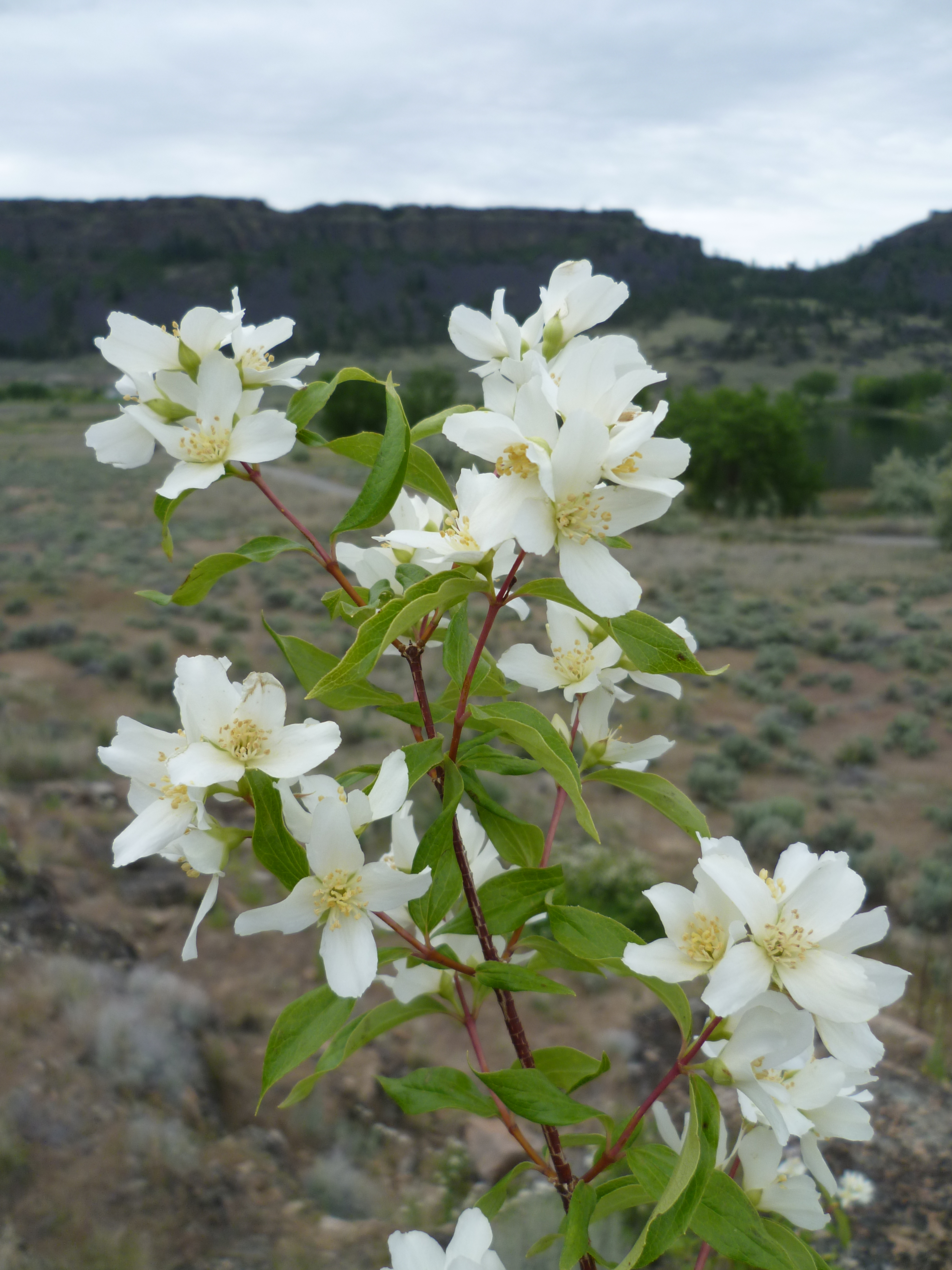

Conservation status
- Secure (NatureServe)

Scientific classification
- Kingdom: Plantae
- Clade: Tracheophytes
- Clade: Angiosperms
- Clade: Eudicots
- Clade: Asterids
- Order: Cornales
- Family: Hydrangeaceae
- Genus: Philadelphus
- Species: P. lewisii

Binomial name
- Philadelphus lewisii Pursh
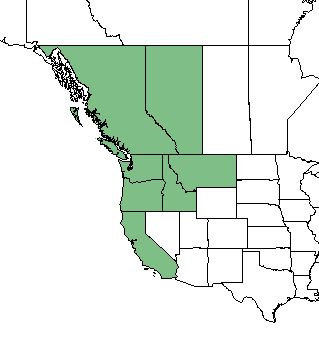
- Distribution of Lewis' mock orange (Philadelphus lewisii)

= Philadelphus lewisii =

Species of flowering plant

Philadelphus lewisii, the Lewis' mock-orange, mock-orange, Gordon's mockorange, wild mockorange, Indian arrowwood, or syringa, is a deciduous shrub native to western North America, and is the state flower of Idaho.

== Description ==
The perennial shrub is rounded and grows to 1.5–3 meters (5–10 feet) in height. It sends out long stems which are red when new and fade to gray with age, the bark shredding in small flakes.

The oppositely arranged leaves vary in size across individual plants but they are usually oval, 3–5 centimeters (1 1/4–2 in) long, smooth or serrated along the edges, and light green in color with a rough texture.

The flowers are produced in clusters at the ends of long stems, with four white petals up to 4 cm (1 1/2 in) long and numerous yellow stamens. At the height of flowering, the plant is covered in a mass of blossoms. The flowers have a heavy, sweet scent similar to orange blossoms with a hint of pineapple.

The fruit is a small hard capsule about 1 cm long with woody, pointed wings, containing many brown seeds. Drought will stunt fruit development and prevent the production of viable seeds.

The plant is somewhat similar in appearance to serviceberry.

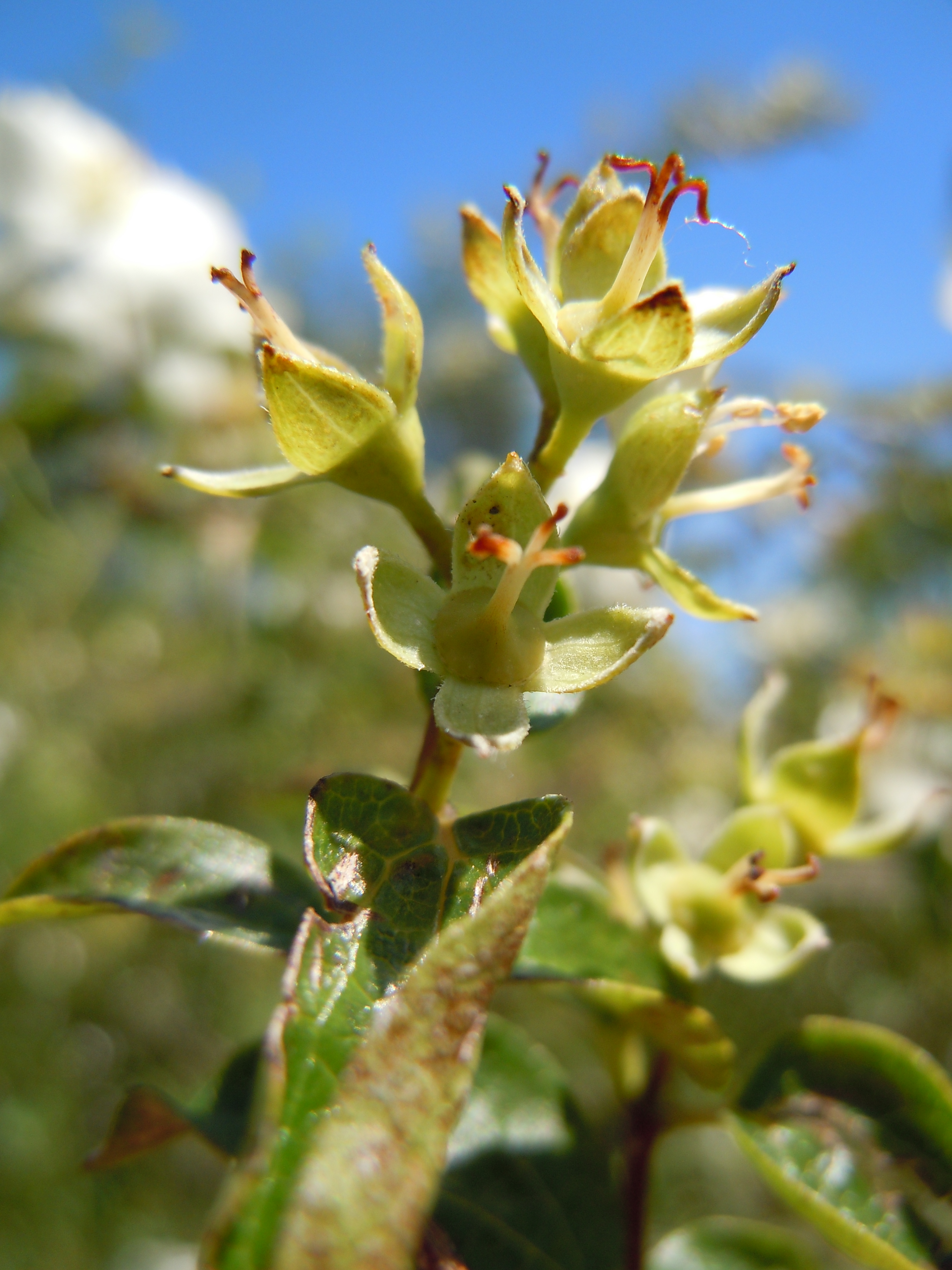
Fruits

== Taxonomy ==
It was first collected for science by scientist and explorer Meriwether Lewis in 1806 during the Lewis and Clark Expedition, and so was named after him.

== Distribution and habitat ==
Lewis' mock-orange occurs from northwestern California in the Sierra Nevada, north through the Pacific Northwest to southern British Columbia, and east to Idaho and Montana. In the Cascades it occurs from sea level up to 2,100 m (7,000 ft), while in the Sierra Nevada it grows from 300–1,520 m (1,000–5,000 ft).

Though it is tolerant of moderate shade, it prefers full sun. It is common in open coniferous forests and on forest edges, and in drier regions of the Northwest it occurs mostly in wetter and riparian areas. It is also found in chaparral and seral communities.

It occurs on well-drained, moist sites, and is tolerant of rocky soil, and it is hardy from USDA zones 3 to 9.

== Ecology ==
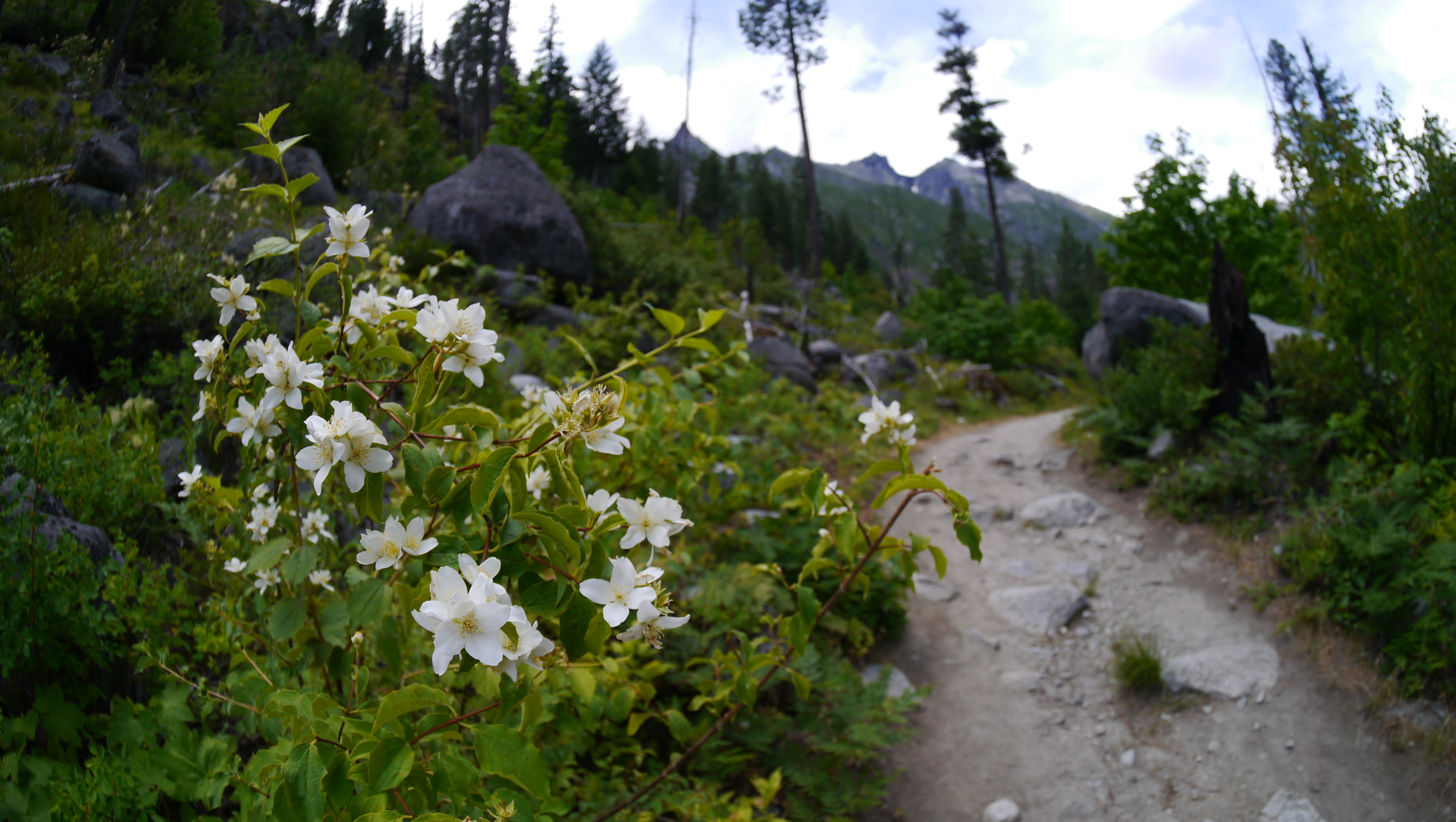
in habitat in Washington state

The foliage of Lewis' mock orange is of moderate importance as winter forage for elk and deer in British Columbia, Idaho, and Montana. In Montana, a 1957 study found that it comprised 2% of mule deer diets in the winter and a trace in the summer.

The seeds are eaten by quail and squirrels.

It occurs in dense shrub habitats which provide good thermal and security cover for wildlife.

Philadelphus lewisii is able to spread vegetatively and from seed. It forms seedbanks in the top 5.1 cm (2 in) of soil.

=== Fire ecology ===
The shrub is native to relatively arid regions of the American West which experience frequent wildfires, and is therefore quite well adapted to fire. Although mock-orange is typically completely top-killed by fires, it will enthusiastically resprout from rhizomes and root crowns afterward. A 1971 study found that in the next growing season after a fire, mock-orange had already regrown to 50% of its previous diameter and height, and that those plants had an average of 28.9 to 38.0 sprouts per plant postfire compared to just 0.6 to 1.5 before.

Lewis' mock orange palatability for Rocky Mountain elk is much greater after fire, with 36.3% of twigs browsed compared to only 1.3% on adjacent unburned sites.

== Human use ==
=== Ethnobotany ===
Native American tribes use P. lewisii for numerous purposes. The hard wood is useful for making hunting and fishing tools, snowshoes, pipes, combs, cradles, netting shuttles, and furniture. The leaves and bark, which contain saponins, are mixed in water for use as a mild soap. The flowers are used in preparing perfumes and teas. The Syilx/Okanagan people use P. lewisii blooming as a temporal sign that marmots are fat and ready to be hunted.

=== Cultivation ===
Lewis' mock-orange prefers full sun to partial sun. It is drought-tolerant, will grow in poor soils, and is suitable for xeriscaping. It provides a landscape with flashy flowers and a fruity scent.

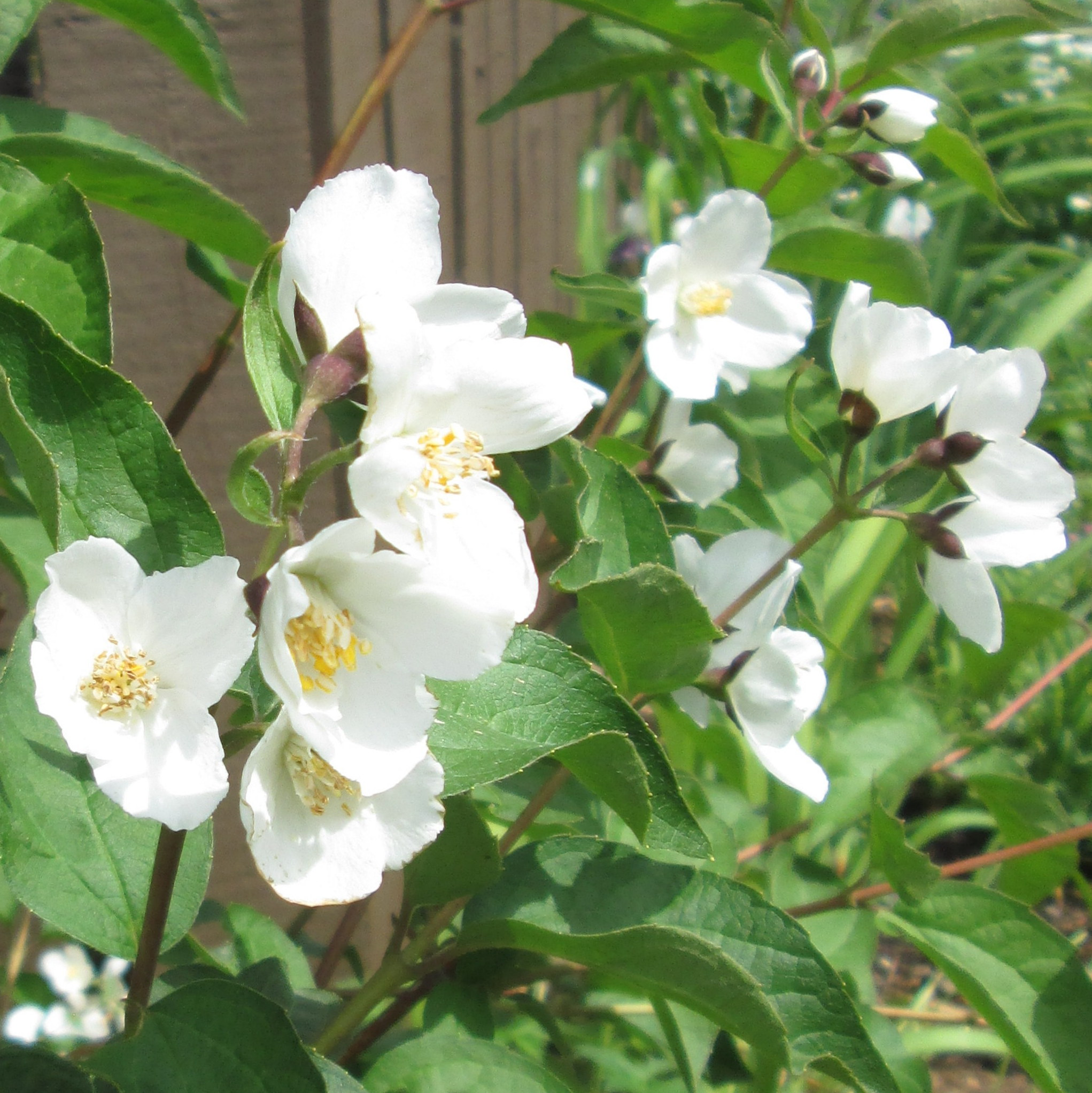
Waterton Mockorange Philadelphus lewisii 'Waterton'

The Waterton Mockorange Philadelphus lewisii 'Waterton' was hybridized by the Alberta Horticultural Research Station in Brooks, Alberta, Canada. It grows to 1.2–1.8 m (4–6 ft) in height. It is named for Augustus Griffin, who in 1933 noted that this plant was growing in what is now Waterton Lakes National Park in Canada.

== In culture ==
Philadelphus lewisii is the state flower of Idaho. The plant is protected by Idaho state law along with other native wildflowers and shrubs, and it is illegal to collect wild specimens on public property for export, sale, or transport without approval.
