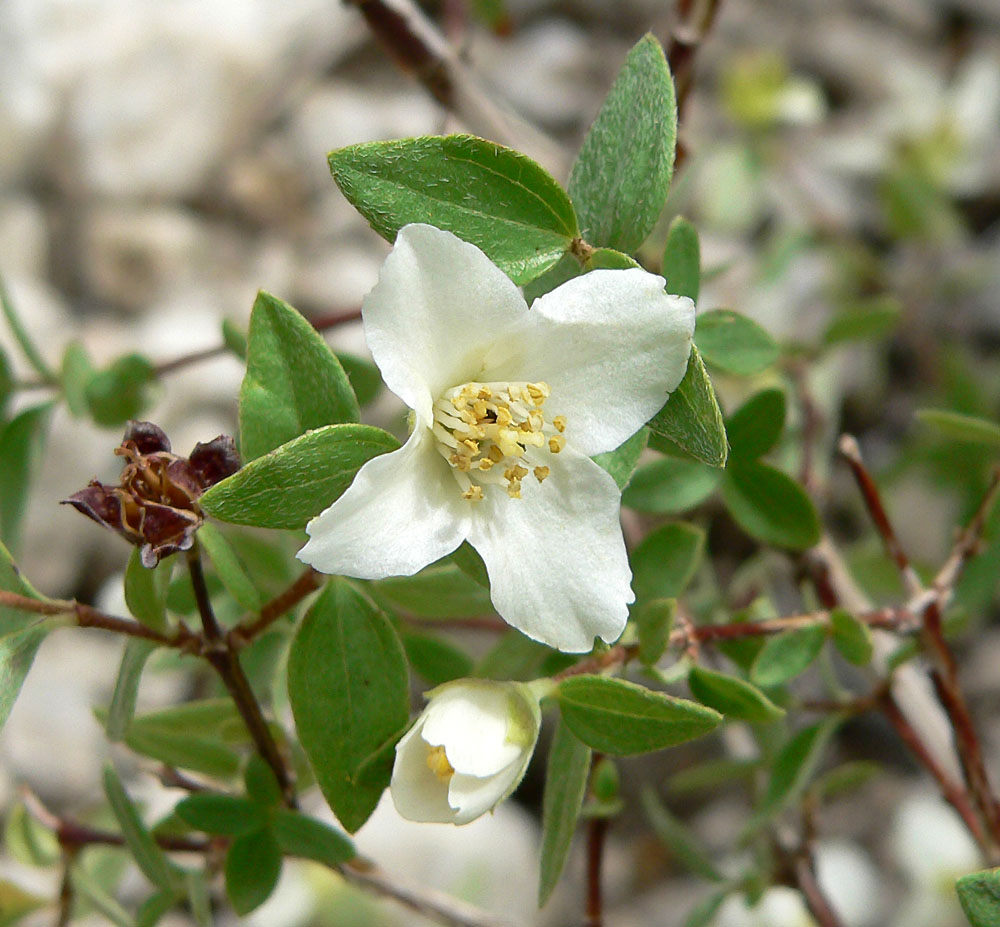

Conservation status
- Secure (NatureServe)

Scientific classification
- Kingdom: Plantae
- Clade: Tracheophytes
- Clade: Angiosperms
- Clade: Eudicots
- Clade: Asterids
- Order: Cornales
- Family: Hydrangeaceae
- Genus: Philadelphus
- Species: P. microphyllus

Binomial name
- Philadelphus microphyllus A.Gray

Varieties
- Philadelphus microphyllus var. argyrocalyx (Wooton) Henrickson; Philadelphus microphyllus var. madrensis (Hemsl.) Henrickson; Philadelphus microphyllus var. microphyllus; Philadelphus microphyllus var. pumilus (Rydb.) Henrickson

Synonyms
- Philadelphus microphyllus subsp. typicus C.L.Hitchc.(1943)

= Philadelphus microphyllus =

Plant species in the hydrangea family

Philadelphus microphyllus is a species of Philadelphus known by the common names littleleaf mock-orange or desert syringa. It is native to northern Mexico and the southwestern quadrant of the United States as far north as Wyoming, where it grows in scrub and brush habitat in foothills and mountains, often in very rocky areas, sometimes anchoring itself in rock cracks and crevices.

== Description ==
Philadelphus microphyllus is a highly variable plant with many subspecies. In general it is a rounded, spreading shrub reaching a maximum height around 2 metres (6 ft 7 in). Young branches are coated in stiff hairs, and older branches have reddish, yellowish, or gray shredding bark. The pointed oval or lance-shaped leaves are up to 2.5 centimetres (0.98 in) long, green, and sometimes hairy. They are oppositely arranged and deciduous.

The inflorescence is a solitary flower or cluster of two or three. The fragrant flower has four or five white or cream petals and a cluster of many stout stamens. The fruit is a hard capsule containing many seeds.

== Cultivation ==
This flowering shrub, Philadelphus microphyllus, is propagated and used as a drought-tolerant ornamental plant in its native range for: traditional gardens; natural landscape, native plant, drought tolerant water conserving, and habitat gardens; and various types of municipal, commercial, and agency sustainable landscape and restoration projects.

== See also ==
- Philadelphus × lemoinei (an hybrid obtained crossing P. microphyllus and P. coronarius)
