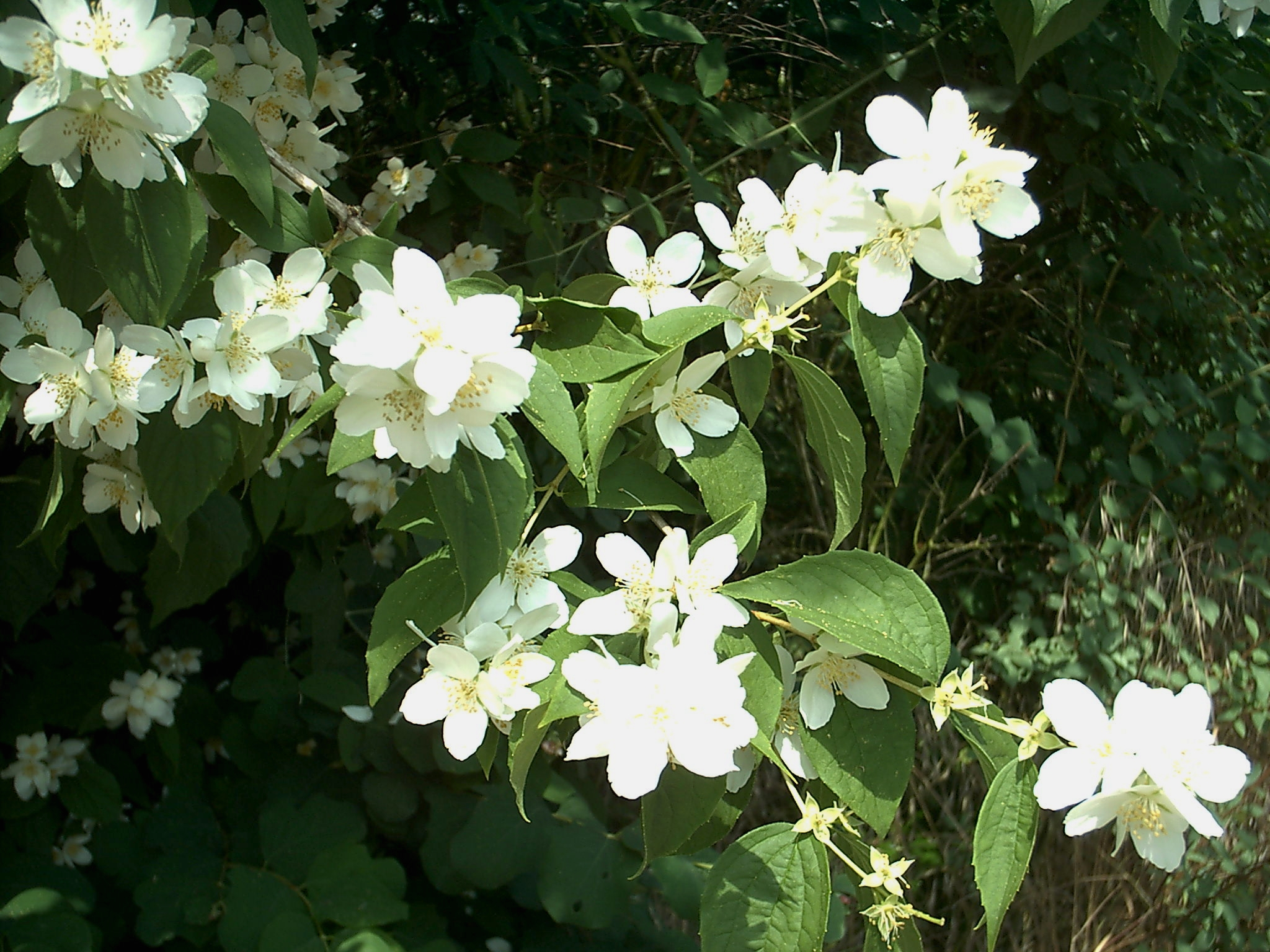

Scientific classification
- Kingdom: Plantae
- Clade: Tracheophytes
- Clade: Angiosperms
- Clade: Eudicots
- Clade: Asterids
- Order: Cornales
- Family: Hydrangeaceae
- Genus: Philadelphus
- Species: P. coronarius

Binomial name
- Philadelphus coronarius L.

= Philadelphus coronarius =

Sweet mock-orange

Species of shrub

Philadelphus coronarius (sweet mock orange, English dogwood) is a species of flowering plant in the family Hydrangeaceae, native to the Caucasus and northeastern Turkey.

== Description ==
It is a deciduous shrub growing to 3 m (10 ft) tall by 2.5 m (8 ft) wide, with toothed leaves and bowl-shaped white flowers with prominent stamens. In the species the blooms are abundant and very fragrant, but less so in the cultivars. It may resemble, but is not closely related to, varieties of the similarly named dogwood, which is the common name for Cornus in the family Cornaceae.

It can be distinguished from other species of the genera by noting its high fragrance, glabrous calyx, and lower surface of its leaves being only partially pubescent at the nerves (and not throughout).

The specific epithet coronarius means "used for garlands".

== Distribution ==
The plant is determined to be native to the areas of Turkey, Transcaucasus, and North Caucasus. (Note: The idea of southern European origin had been floated by botanists in the past, and persist in some current literature by non-botanists. Linnaeus who suggested Verona, Italy, however, Hu (1954) already saw no evidence of the plant spontaneously occurring in Spain, Italy, etc., even though British predecessors W. J. Bean (d. 1947) nd Alfred Rehder (d. 1949) had been supportive of the hypothesis. The Kew Garden's current POWO database excludes Europe from place of origin.) (Note: Another (outdated) idea is that the Japanese species P. satsumi was a subspecies of P. corronarius, and this was the first to be introduced into Europe, suggested by Schrader (1838) The Japanese (native, endemic) taxon is currently accepted as species in its own right.) (Note: Likewise, it is a now rejected taxonomy that was suggested by Maximowicz (1867) Revisio Hydrangearum Asiae Orientalis, which treated all Japanese and continental Asian Philadelphus as varieties of P. coronarius. Maximowicz (like Schrader) also advanced the Japanese origin to the plants found in Europe, according to Shirō Kitamura (1974), who in turn supported the idea, though the conventional wisdom at the time was that the species was of uncertain origin.) It has spreads to wide parts of Europe, also Eastern Canada (Quebec and half of Ontario) and U.S. (Atlantic Coast to Georgia, the South, Midwest)

In 1562 the plant was introduced from Turkey into Europe by Ogier Ghiselin de Busbecq returning to Holy Roman Empire from his ambassadorship to the sultan Around the same period, the lilac was introduced from the same general area (Middle East), and confusingly both called syringa (literally pan pipe, or pipe), not because the flowers etc. were particularly similar but because they both had hollowed stems and were used for manufacturing pipes by the Turks.

Thus pre-Linnaean authors referred to Philadelphus spp. as Syrigna alba. Carolus Clusius when he illustrated the plant in his Libri Picturati (1576) used the name Syrigna flore alba but he also developed the name Frutex coronarius which only he used in Rariorum plantarum historia (1601).

They were known to be grown in Austria and Hungary in the 16th century, (Note: clusius (1601?) apud Hu (1954), p. 100.) and Clusius found them in a Belgian garden, later introducing the plant to Spain. In England, John Gerard professed to growing the characteristically fragranced plant in profusion in his Herball (1597), but he used the name Syrigna alba, which confused some writers into thinking they were white-flowered lilacs, even though Gerard actually meant the mock oranges.

== Cultivation ==
It is a sweetly scented white blossom suitable for temperate climate cultivation as ornamental plant for gardens. It blooms in spring (April to May) in the American South, perhaps later in the temperate Midwest (April to May). It tolerates cold as well as heat and drought. But Hansen considered it too winter-tender for South Dakota as the shrub died off to the ground during the cold.

It is easily propagated by cuttings, by division, from self-sewn seedling, etc.

There are a large number of named cultivars. It also interbreeds readily with other species. A number of P. coronarius × P. microphyllus have been introduced by the Lemoine Nursery (Nice, France).

The following cultivars have gained the Royal Horticultural Society's Award of Garden Merit:-

- P. coronarius 'Aureus'
- P. coronarius 'Variegatus'

The 16th century botanist Gerard considered the fragrance to be too intense and it disturbed his sleep. E. A. Bowles claimed it triggered allergic reaction, with hay fever-like symptoms.

== Other uses ==
The mock orange blossom, said to resemble the smell of orange blossoms, has been used in modern perfumery, though the essential oil is nowadays usually synthesized. Once marketed as "oil of syringa" or "oil of false jasmine" (in Europe), it had been used in the manufacture of cheap pomade called "orange-blossom pomade" in the South of France. In the present-day, one suggested use is as potpourri.

The blossom tea can also be made, according to English botanical painter Alice Margaret Coats. Such use as tea occurs locally in the Baltic countries (Latvia and Estonia) according to current literature. (Note: Tiţă, I; Mogoşanu, G.D., Tiţă, M.G.(2009) Ethnomedicinal inventory of medicinal plants from the south-west of Romania and Prūse et al. (2021b) apud Paniagua-Zambrana et al. (2025))

Coats also suggested that the leaves of the plant can add cucumber-like flavor to a beverage.

== Gallery ==
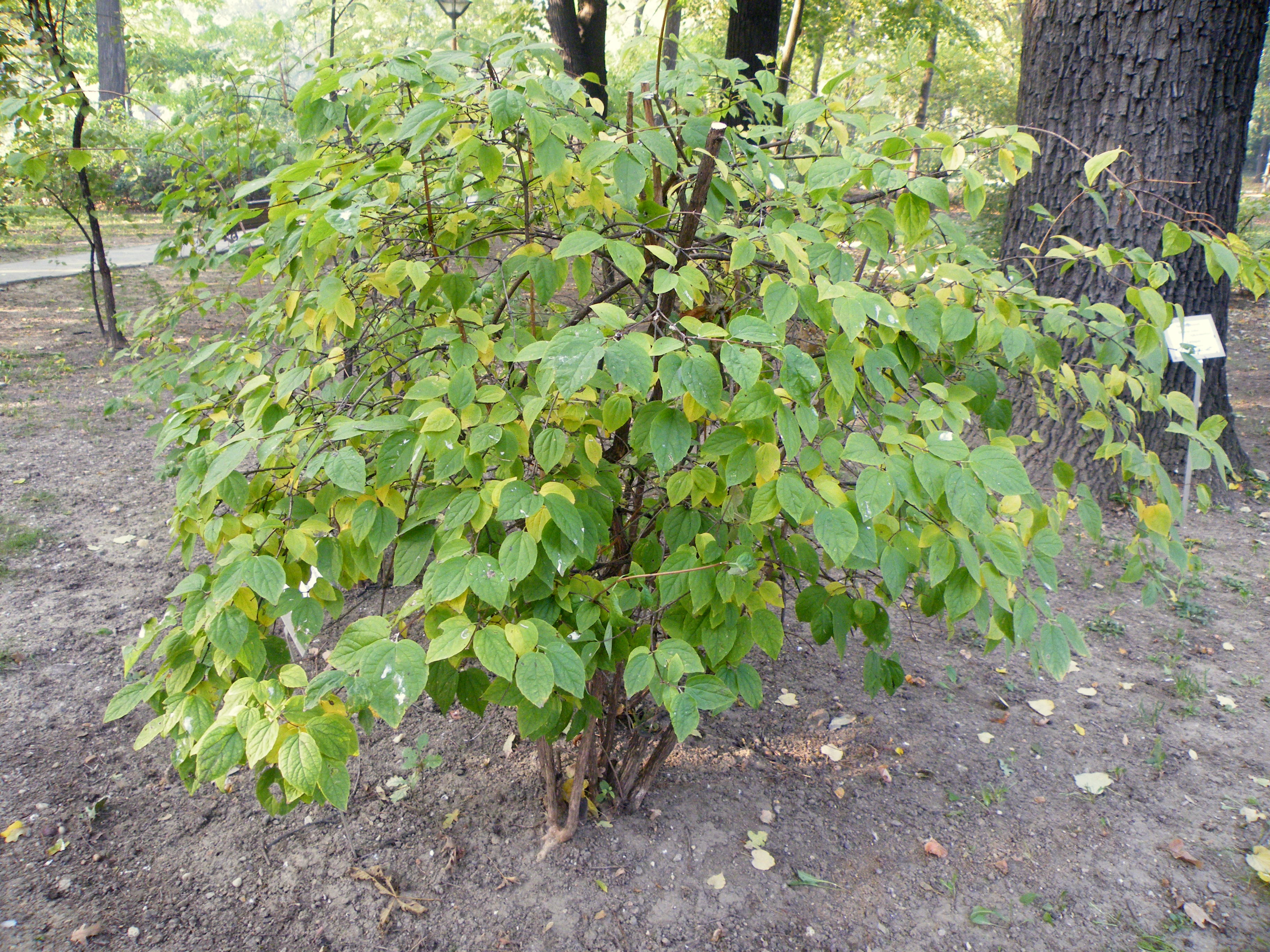
Shrub

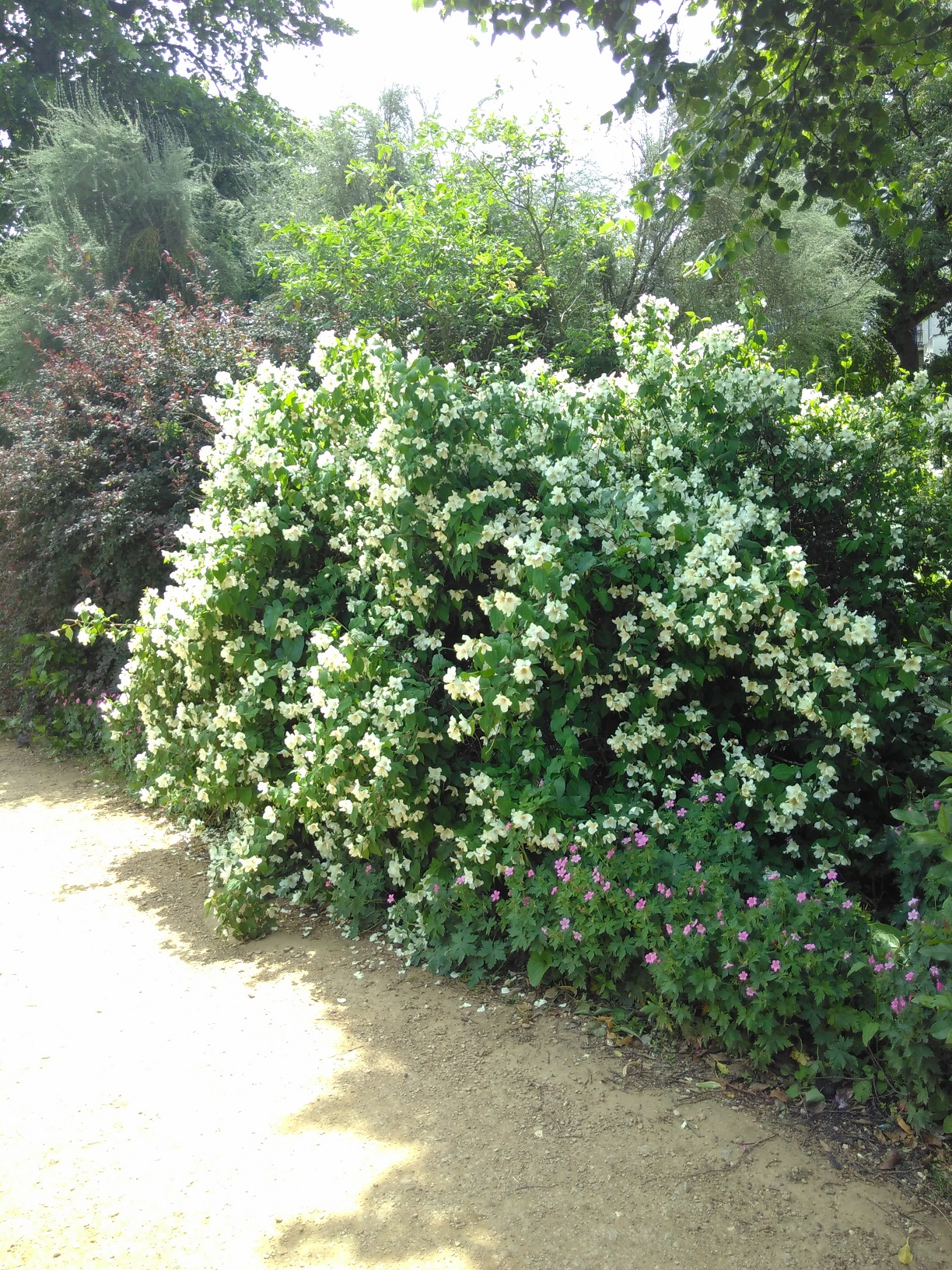
Shrub

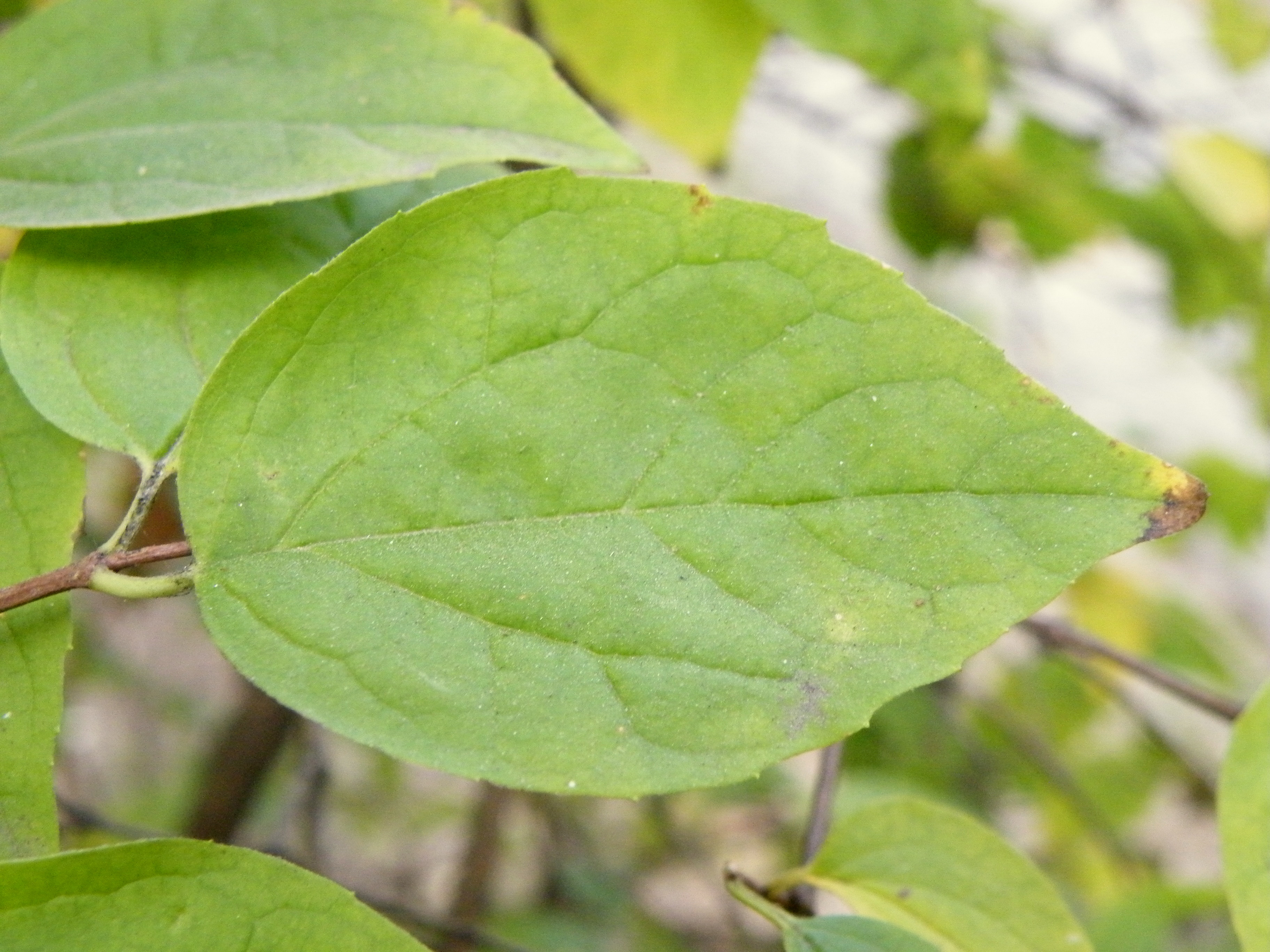
Leaf

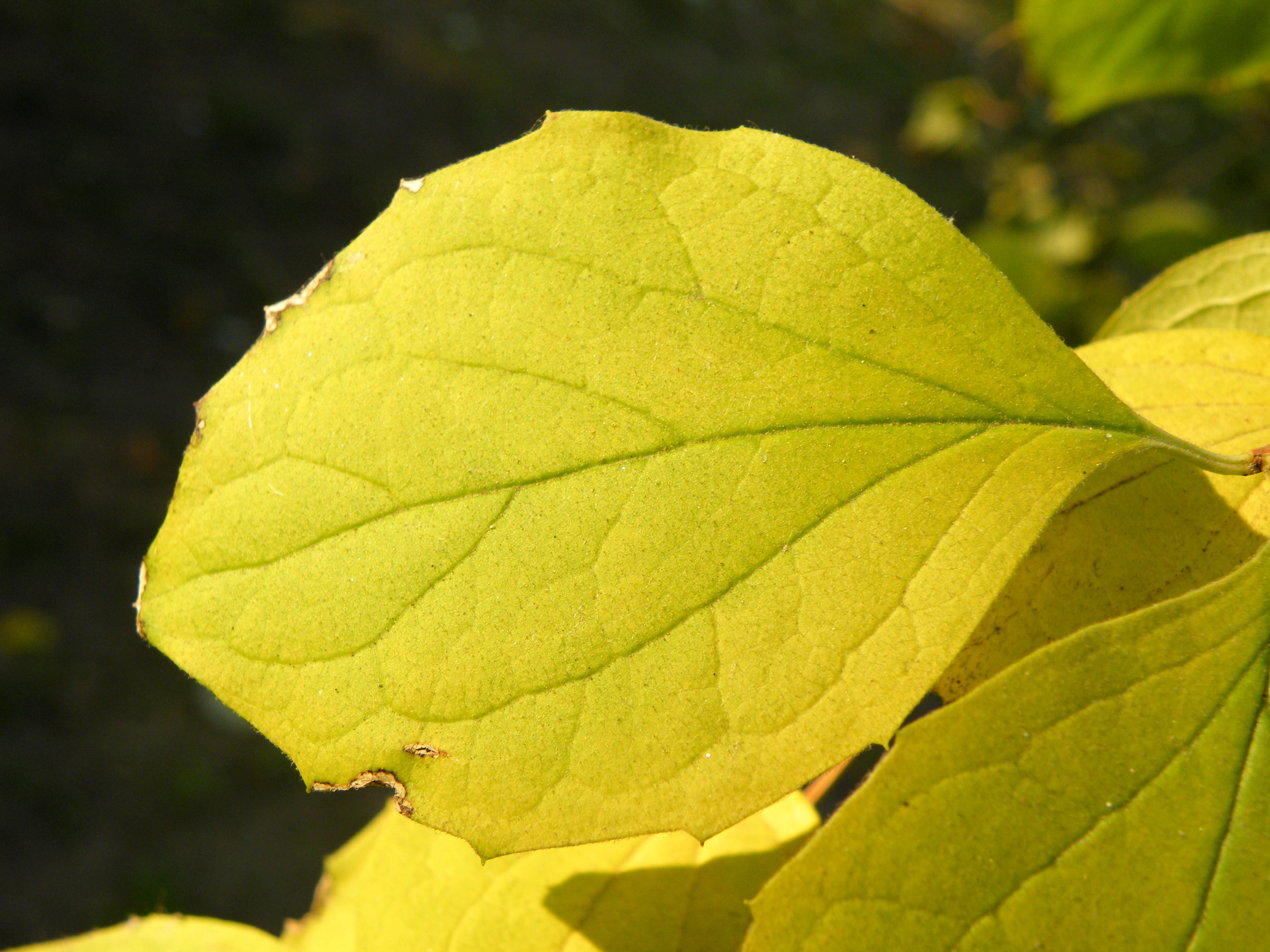
Leaf

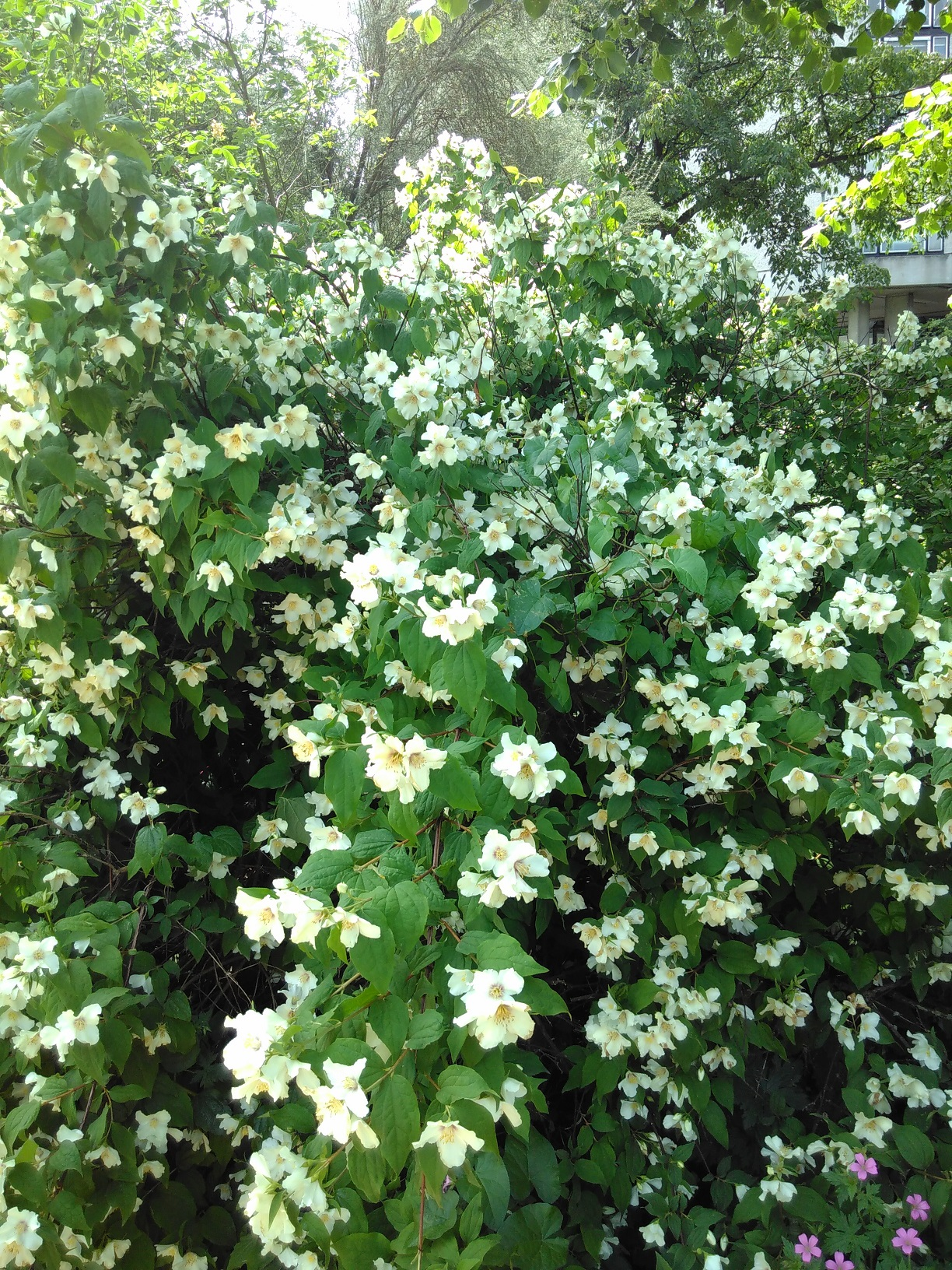
Flowers

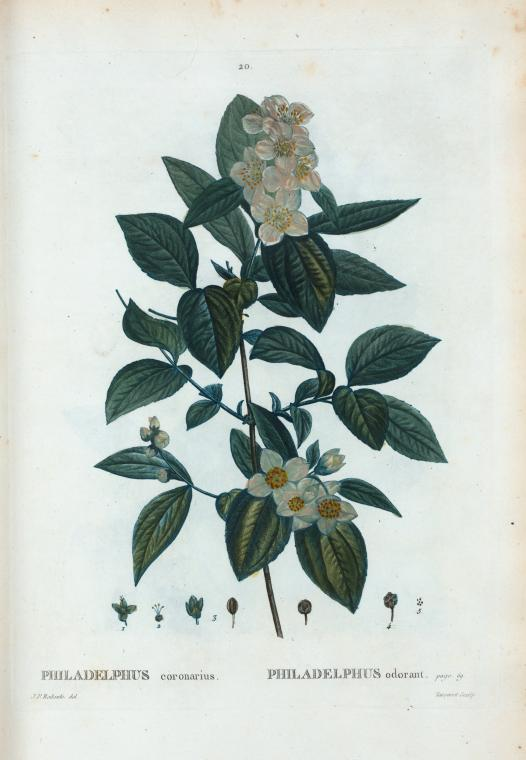
Botanical illustration

== See also ==
- Philadelphus × lemoinei (an hybrid obtained crossing P. coronarius and P. microphyllus)
