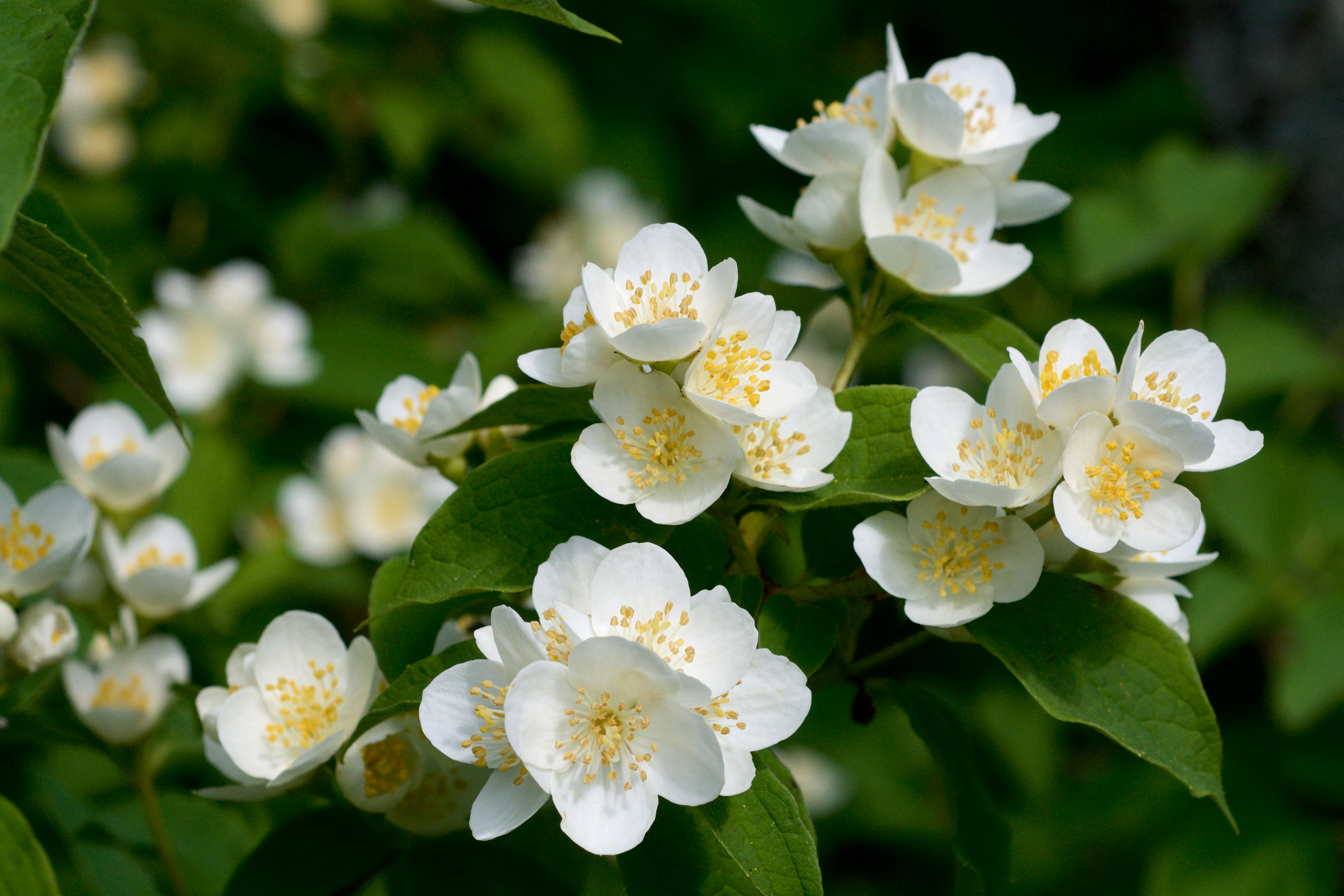

Scientific classification
- Kingdom: Plantae
- Clade: Tracheophytes
- Clade: Angiosperms
- Clade: Eudicots
- Clade: Asterids
- Order: Cornales
- Family: Hydrangeaceae
- Genus: Philadelphus
- Species: P. pubescens

Binomial name
- Philadelphus pubescens Loisel

= Philadelphus pubescens =

Species of flowering plant

Philadelphus pubescens is a species of flowering plant in the hydrangea family known by the common name hoary mock orange. It is native to the eastern United States. It is a perennial shrub growing up to 20 feet (6.1 metres) tall. The flowers are white.
