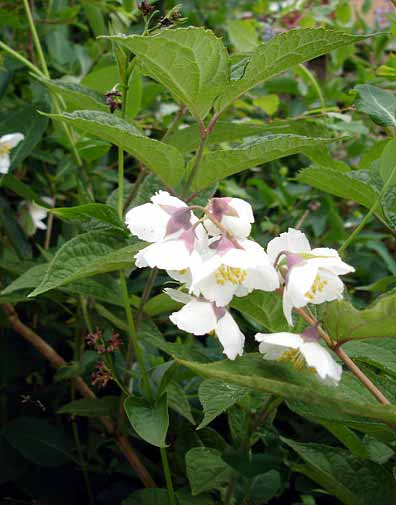

Scientific classification
- Kingdom: Plantae
- Clade: Tracheophytes
- Clade: Angiosperms
- Clade: Eudicots
- Clade: Asterids
- Order: Cornales
- Family: Hydrangeaceae
- Genus: Philadelphus
- Species: P. purpurascens

Binomial name
- Philadelphus purpurascens (Koehne) Rehder

= Philadelphus purpurascens =

Species of shrub

Philadelphus purpurascens is a deciduous shrub native to Yunnan and Sichuan in southwestern China, growing in mixed forests, thickets and on mountain slopes.

It is a shrub growing 1.5–4 metres (4 ft 11 in – 13 ft 1 in) tall. The leaves are ovate to elliptic, glabrous or sparsely villous along the veins. The flowers are produced in racemes of 5-7 (-9) together; the individual flowers are white, with a purple or dark brown calyx. Flowering is in spring or early summer.

Three varieties are recognized by the Flora of China:

- Philadelphus purpurascens var. szechuanensis
- Philadelphus purpurascens var. purpurascens
- Philadelphus purpurascens var. venustus

== Cultivation ==
It is easy to grow in ordinary garden soil. It tolerates dry conditions and prefers full sun. Plants are tolerant of pruning and could be cut back every year after flowering to promote next years flowers. It is hardy to USDA zone 6. It is best propagated by winter cuttings or seeds.
