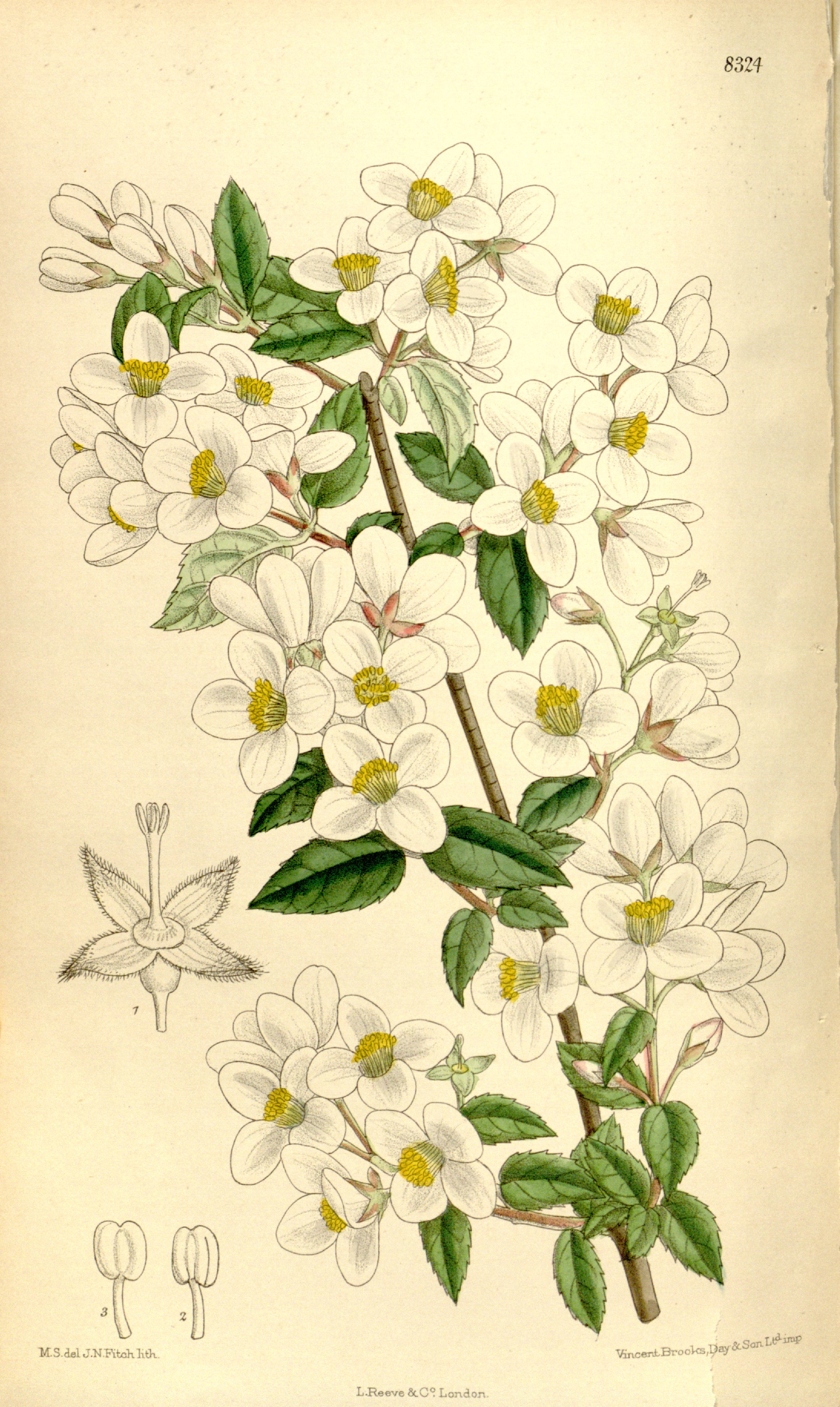

Scientific classification
- Kingdom: Plantae
- Clade: Tracheophytes
- Clade: Angiosperms
- Clade: Eudicots
- Clade: Asterids
- Order: Cornales
- Family: Hydrangeaceae
- Genus: Philadelphus
- Species: P. delavayi

Binomial name
- Philadelphus delavayi L.Henry

= Philadelphus delavayi =

Species of shrub

Philadelphus delavayi is a deciduous shrub in the genus Philadelphus, native to China, Tibet, and Upper Burma. It was discovered by Pierre Jean Marie Delavay in 1887. It has an upright growth habit, to a height of 3 metres, with arching branches and ovate, tapered, sometimes toothed, dark green leaves up to 10 cm or more long. It bears racemes of 5-9 cup shaped, single, very fragrant creamy-white flowers, 2.5 cm across.
