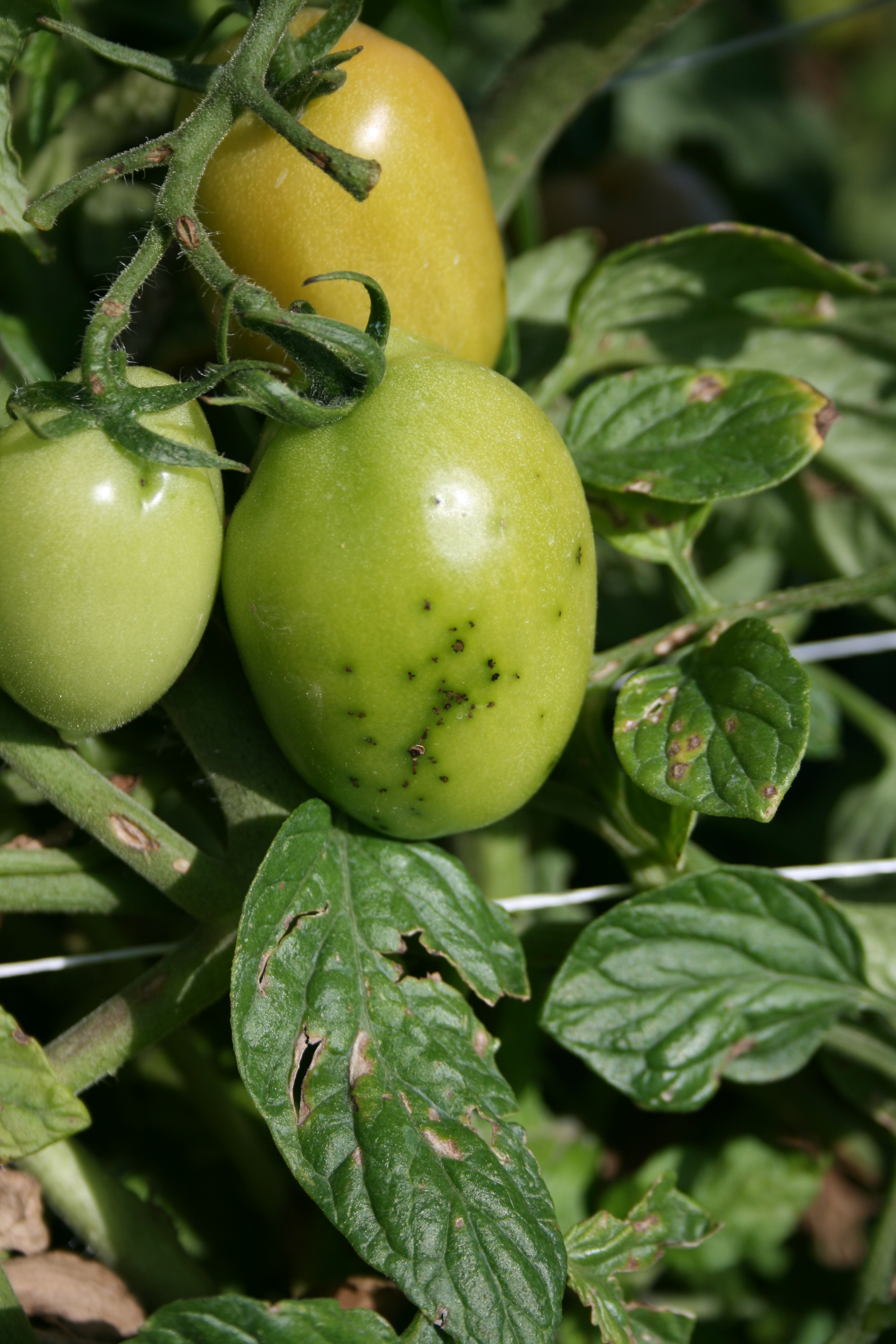

Scientific classification
- Domain: Bacteria
- Kingdom: Pseudomonadati
- Phylum: Pseudomonadota
- Class: Gammaproteobacteria
- Order: Pseudomonadales
- Family: Pseudomonadaceae
- Genus: Pseudomonas
- Species: P. tomato

Binomial name
- Pseudomonas tomato Gardan et al. 1999

Type strain
- CFBP 2212

Pathovars
- "P. t." pv. antirrhini; "P. t." pv. apii; "P. t." pv. berberidis; "P. t." pv. delphinii; "P. t." pv. lachrymans; "P. t." pv. maculicola; "P. t." pv. morsprunorum; "P. t." pv. passiflorae; "P. t." pv. persicae; "P. t." pv. philadelphi; "P. t." pv. primulae; "P. t." pv. ribicola; "P. t." pv. tomato; "P. t." pv. viburni

= Pseudomonas tomato =

Species of bacterium

"Pseudomonas tomato" is a Gram-negative plant pathogenic bacterium that infects a variety of plants. It was once considered a pathovar of Pseudomonas syringae, but following DNA-relatedness studies, it was recognized as a separate species and several other former P. syringae pathovars were incorporated into it. Since no official name has yet been given, it is referred to by the epithet 'Pseudomonas tomato' .

== Pathovars ==
- "Pseudomonas tomato" pv. antirrhini attacks snapdragons (Antirrhinum majus).
- "Pseudomonas tomato" pv. apii attacks celery (Apium graveolens).
- "Pseudomonas tomato" pv. berberidis attacks Berberis species.
- "Pseudomonas tomato" pv. delphinii attacks Delphinium species.
- "Pseudomonas tomato" pv. lachrymans attacks cucumbers (Cucumis sativus).
- "Pseudomonas tomato" pv. maculicola attacks members of Brassica and Raphanus.
- "Pseudomonas tomato" pv. morsprunorum attacks plums (Prunus domestica).
- "Pseudomonas tomato" pv. passiflorae attacks passion fruit (Passiflora edulis).
- "Pseudomonas tomato" pv. persicae attacks the plum relative Prunus persica.
- "Pseudomonas tomato" pv. philadelphi attacks the sweet mock-orange (Philadelphus coronarius).
- "Pseudomonas tomato" pv. primulae attacks Primula species.
- "Pseudomonas tomato" pv. ribicola attacks the golden currant Ribes aureum.
- "Pseudomonas tomato" pv. tomato attacks the tomato (Lycopersicon esculentum) causing it to fruit less.
- "Pseudomonas tomato" pv. viburni attacks Viburnum species.

== See also ==
- Plant pathology
