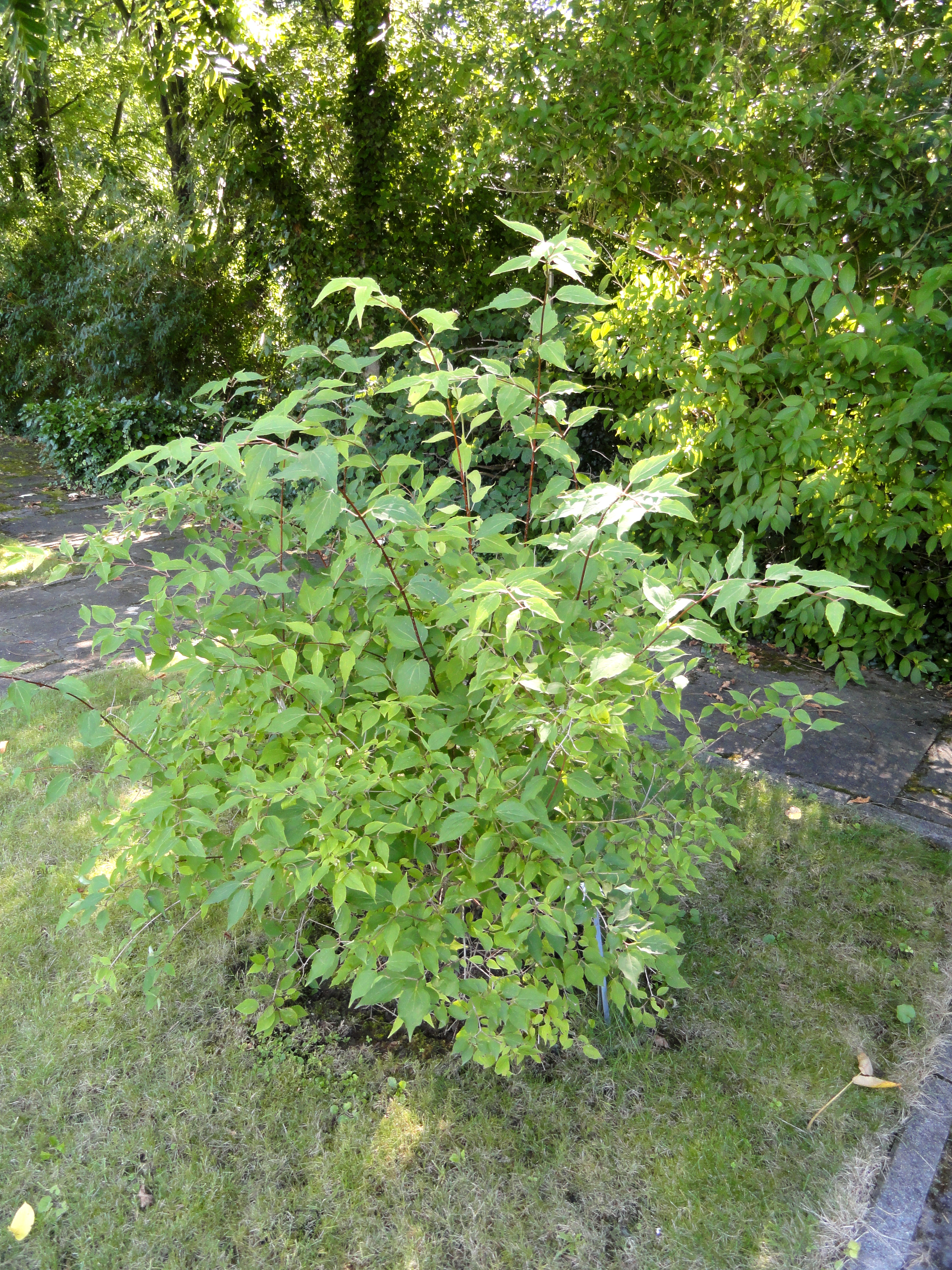

Scientific classification
- Kingdom: Plantae
- Clade: Tracheophytes
- Clade: Angiosperms
- Clade: Eudicots
- Clade: Asterids
- Order: Cornales
- Family: Hydrangeaceae
- Genus: Philadelphus
- Species: P. pekinensis

Binomial name
- Philadelphus pekinensis Rupr.

= Philadelphus pekinensis =

Species of shrub

Philadelphus pekinensis (mock orange, 太平花 tai ping hua) is a species of deciduous shrub, 1–2 metres (3 ft 3 in – 6 ft 7 in) high, endemic to northern and western China and Korea, with fragrant flowers up to 1" across in small clusters.

== Synonyms ==
- Philadelphus coronarius var. pekinensis Maxim.
- Philadelphus pekinensis f. lanceolatus S.Y. Hu
- Philadelphus pekinensis var. pekinensis
- Philadelphus rubricaulis Carrière
