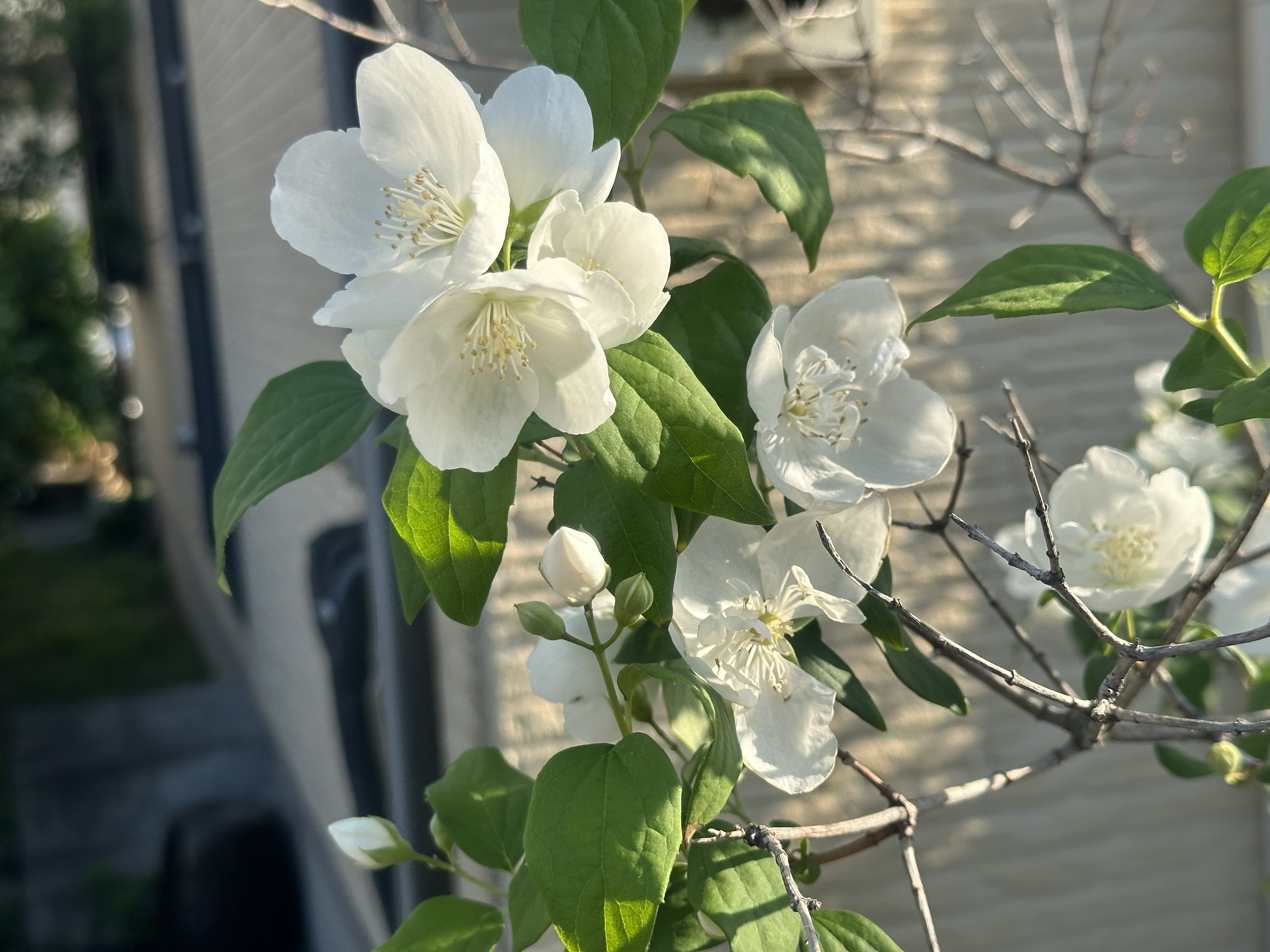

Scientific classification
- Kingdom: Plantae
- Clade: Tracheophytes
- Clade: Angiosperms
- Clade: Eudicots
- Clade: Asterids
- Order: Cornales
- Family: Hydrangeaceae
- Genus: Philadelphus
- Species: P. satsumi

Binomial name
- Philadelphus satsumi Siebold ex Lindl. & Paxton

Synonyms
- Philadelphus coronarius L. var. satsumi (Siebold ex Lindl. et Paxton) Maxim.

= Philadelphus satsumi =

Species of flowering plant

Philadelphus satsumi (バイカウツギ, baika-utsugi) is a species of flowering plant in the family Hydrangeaceae that is endemic to Japan.

== Description ==
Philadelphus satsumi is a deciduous shrub with white flowers, each having four petals.

== Distribution ==
Philadelphus satsumi is endemic to Japan, where it occurs on Honshū (south from Iwate Prefecture), Shikoku, and Kyūshū (north of Kagoshima Prefecture).
