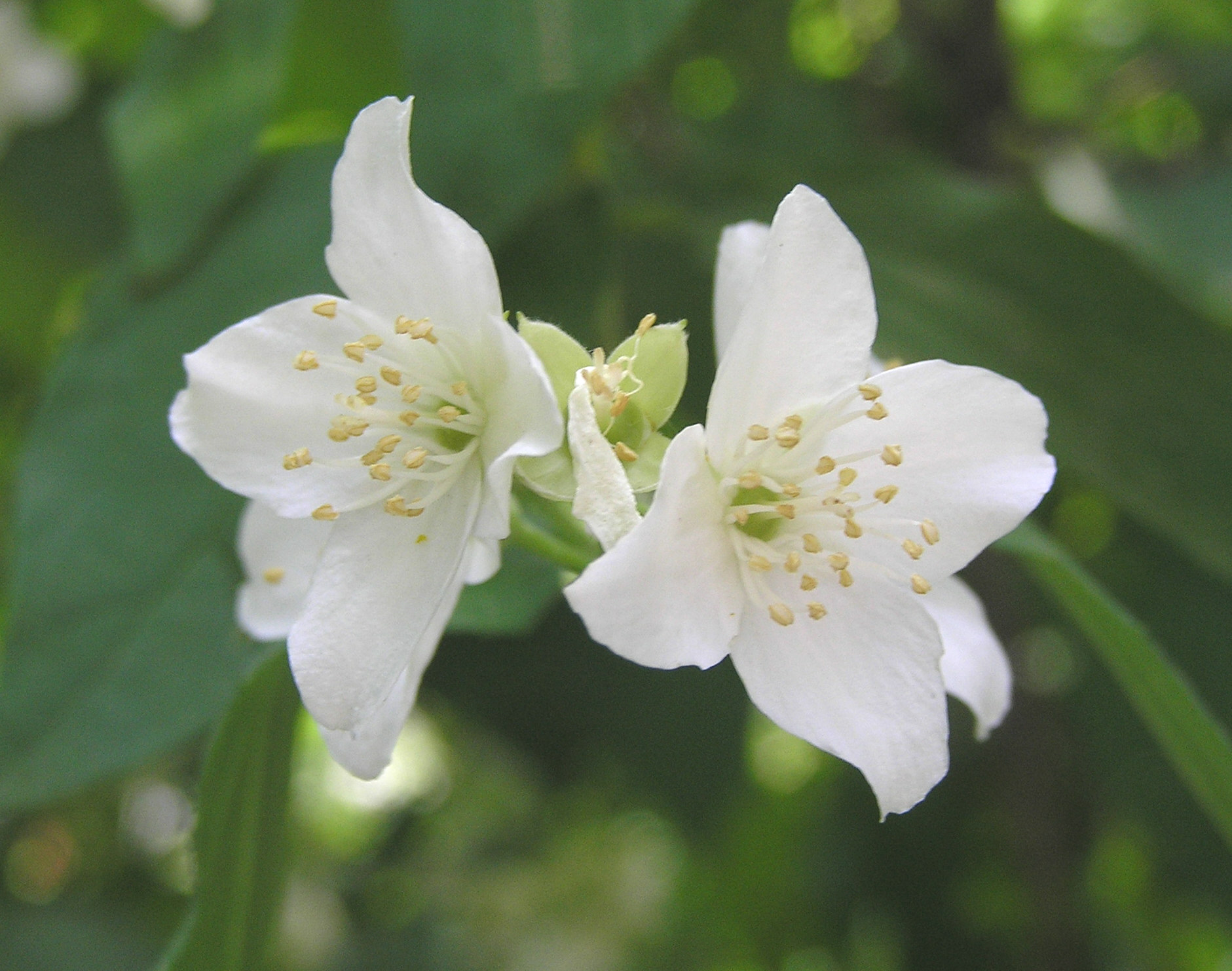
- Flowers at the Shenyang Botanical Garden
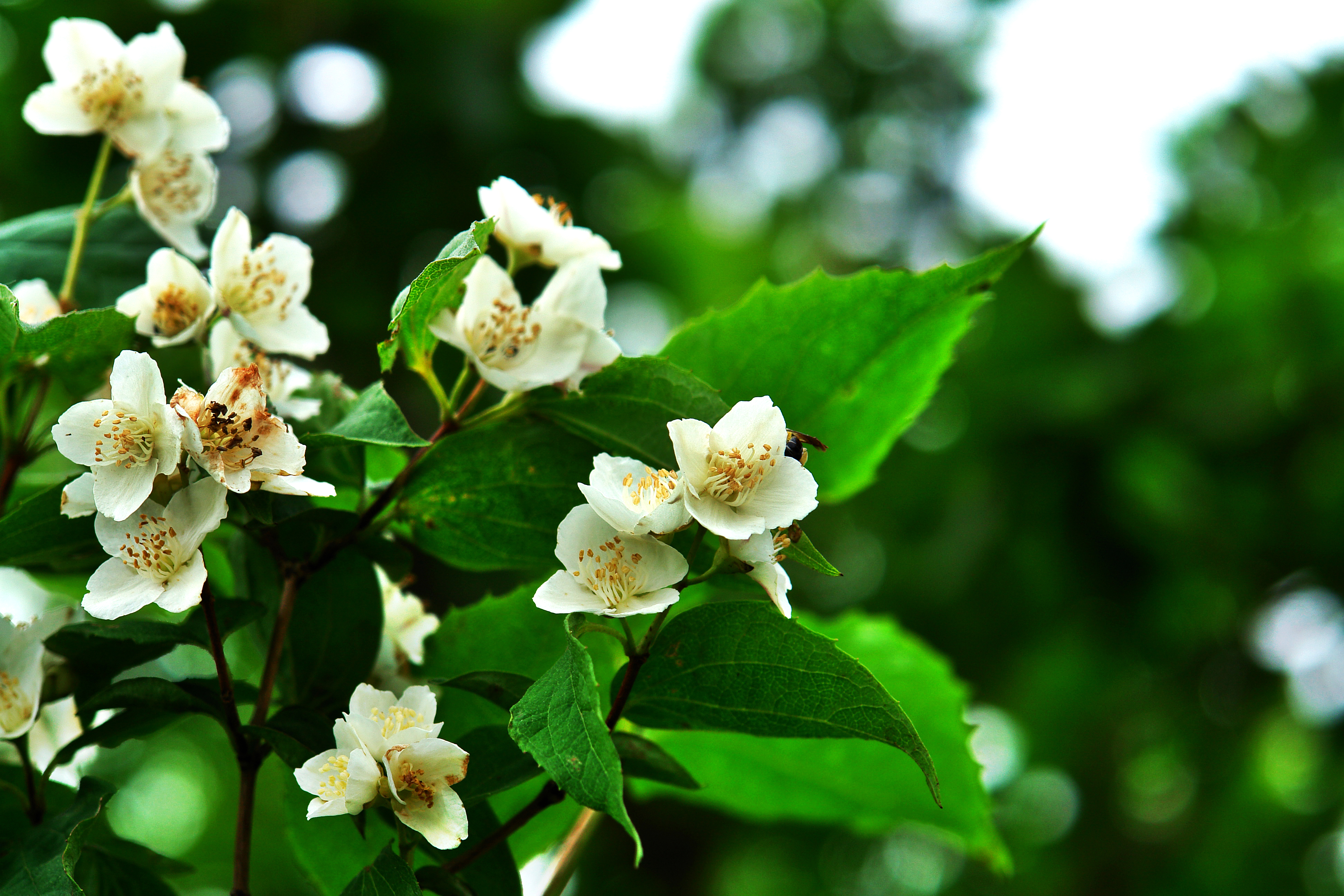
- View of leaves with flowers

Scientific classification
- Kingdom: Plantae
- Clade: Embryophytes
- Clade: Tracheophytes
- Clade: Spermatophytes
- Clade: Angiosperms
- Clade: Eudicots
- Clade: Asterids
- Order: Cornales
- Family: Hydrangeaceae
- Genus: Philadelphus
- Species: P. schrenkii

Binomial name
- Philadelphus schrenkii Rupr.

Synonyms
- List: Philadelphus coronarius var. mandshuricus Maxim.; Philadelphus mandshuricus (Maxim.) Nakai; Philadelphus schrenkii var. jackii Koehne; Philadelphus schrenkii f. longipedicellatus Nakai; Philadelphus schrenkii var. mandshuricus (Maxim.) Kitag.; Philadelphus seoulensis Y.H.Chung & H.Shin; Philadelphus tenuifolius var. schrenkii (Rupr.) J.J.Vassil.; Philadelphus tenuifolius f. seoulensis (Y.H.Chung & H.Shin) M.Kim

= Philadelphus schrenkii =

Species of plant

Philadelphus schrenkii, the Schrenk mock orange, is a species of flowering plant in the family Hydrangeaceae. It is native to the southern Russian Far East, northern China, and Korea. A shrub reaching 2 to 4 m (7 to 13 ft), it is typically found in mixed forests at elevations from 100 to 1,500 m (300 to 4,900 ft). As an ornamental, it is hardy in USDA zones 5 to 8, can tolerate light shade, and is recommended for its early flowering and as a border or hedge.
