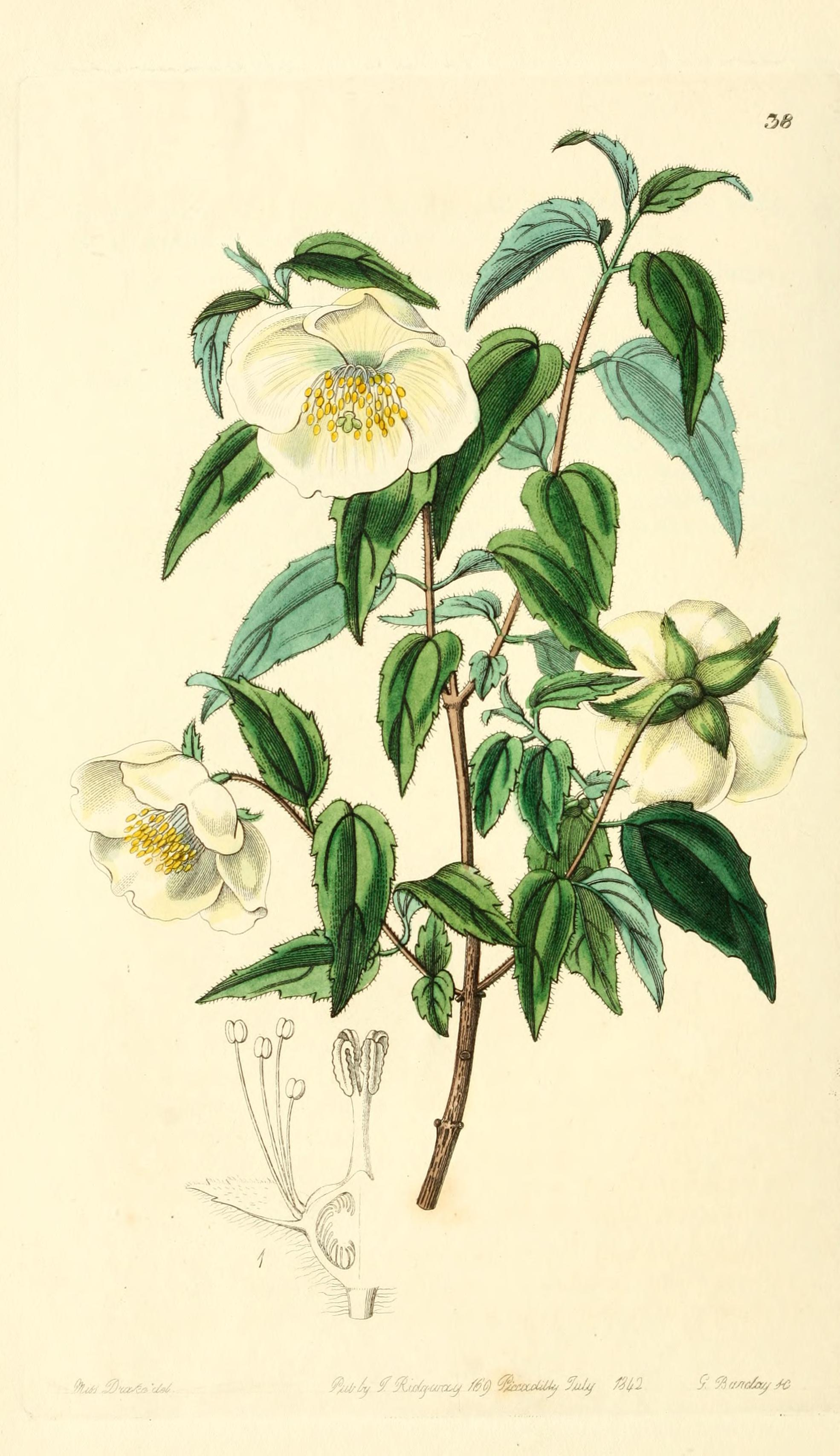

Scientific classification
- Kingdom: Plantae
- Clade: Tracheophytes
- Clade: Angiosperms
- Clade: Eudicots
- Clade: Asterids
- Order: Cornales
- Family: Hydrangeaceae
- Genus: Philadelphus
- Species: P. mexicanus

Binomial name
- Philadelphus mexicanus Schltdl.

= Philadelphus mexicanus =

Species of shrub

Philadelphus mexicanus is a shrub belonging to the genus Philadelphus, native to Mexico and Guatemala. It is a spreading, evergreen shrub with pendent, bristly shoots and ovate, sometimes partly toothed leaves up to 11 centimetres (4.3 in) long. Flowers are single, cup shaped, rose scented, creamy white in colour, measuring up to 4 centimetres (1.6 in) across. 'Rose syringa' (syn. Philadelphus maculatus) is the most commonly cultivated variety and has fragrant white flowers with a purple blotch in the centre.
