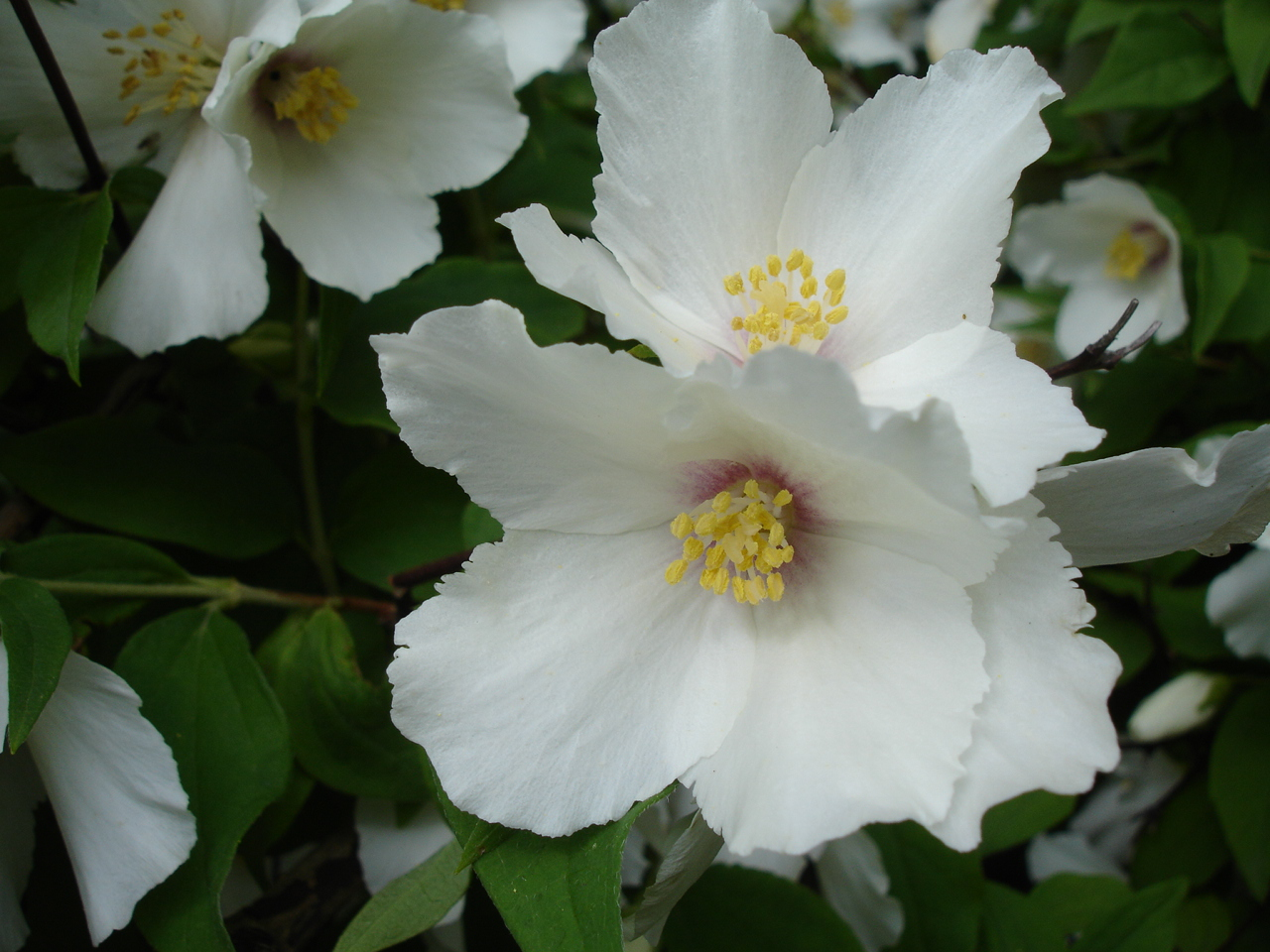
- Philadelphus × purpureomaculatus, cultivar 'Belle Étoile'

Scientific classification
- Kingdom: Plantae
- Clade: Embryophytes
- Clade: Tracheophytes
- Clade: Angiosperms
- Clade: Eudicots
- Clade: Asterids
- Order: Cornales
- Family: Hydrangeaceae
- Subfamily: Hydrangeoideae
- Tribe: Philadelpheae
- Genus: Philadelphus; L.

Type species
- Philadelphus coronarius L.

Species
- About 60, see text

= Philadelphus =

Mock-orange

Genus of shrubs

Philadelphus (/ˌfɪləˈdɛlfəs/) (mock-orange) is a genus of about 60 species of shrubs from 3–20 ft (1–6 m) tall, native to North America, Central America, Asia and (locally) in southeast Europe.

They are named "mock-orange" in reference to their flowers, which in wild species look somewhat similar to those of oranges and lemons (Citrus) at first glance, and smell of orange flowers and jasmine (Jasminum). But Philadelphus is a basal asterid, not closely related to Jasminum (advanced asterids), and among the eudicots quite distant from Citrus (advanced rosids). An entirely misleading name for Philadelphus that is sometimes encountered is syringa; this properly refers to the lilacs, which are fairly close relatives of jasmine. The connection of the two shrubs lies in their introduction from Ottoman gardens to European ones, effected at the same time by the Holy Roman emperor's ambassador to the Sublime Porte, Ogier Ghiselin de Busbecq, who returned to Vienna in 1562. The two shrubs appear together in John Gerard's Herball, as "Blew Pipe" (the lilac) and "White Pipe Tree", for the woods of both are pithy and easily hollowed out.

Philadelphus is named after an ancient Greek king of Egypt, Ptolemy II Philadelphus.

== Description ==
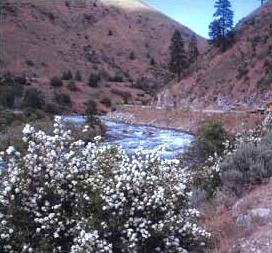
Flowering Lewis's Mock-orange (Philadelphus lewisii) in habitat

Most are deciduous but a few species from the south of the genus' range are evergreen. The leaves are opposite, simple, with serrated margins, from 0.5-6 inches (1–14 cm) long. The flowers are white, with four petals and sepals, 0.5-2 inches (1–4 cm) diameter, and commonly (but not in all species) sweetly scented. The fruit is a small capsule, containing numerous small seeds. The bark is thin and flaky, finely shredding in longitudinal strips.

== Ecology ==
Mock-oranges are used as food plants by the larvae of some Lepidoptera species including the engrailed (Ectropis crepuscularia). A noted pathogen of the sweet mock-orange (P. coronarius) is the undescribed proteobacterium called "Pseudomonas tomato" (pv. philadelphi).

== Cultivation ==
For a long time, Philadelphus coronarius was the only mock-orange of gardens, though some adventurous Americans grew the native P. inodorus that Mark Catesby had discovered growing on the banks of the Savannah River. It appeared in Lady Skipwith's garden lists and George Washington ordered some from Bartram in 1792. Mock-oranges are popular shrubs in parks and gardens, grown for their reliable display of late spring flowers; the scented species are particularly valued. In addition to the species, there are numerous garden origin hybrids and cultivars available, selected for doubleness and large flowers, with some compromise as to scent.

=== AGM cultivars ===
The following hybrid cultivars have gained the Royal Horticultural Society's Award of Garden Merit:-

- 'Aureus' (P. coronarius)
- 'Beauclerk'
- 'Belle Étoile'
- 'Innocence'
- 'Manteau d'Hermine'
- 'Sybille'
- 'Variegatus' (P. coronarius)

== In culture ==
Lewis' mock-orange (P. lewisii) is the state flower of Idaho.

"Mock orange" is one of the most famous poems by the Nobel Prize winning poet Louise Glück.

== Selected species ==
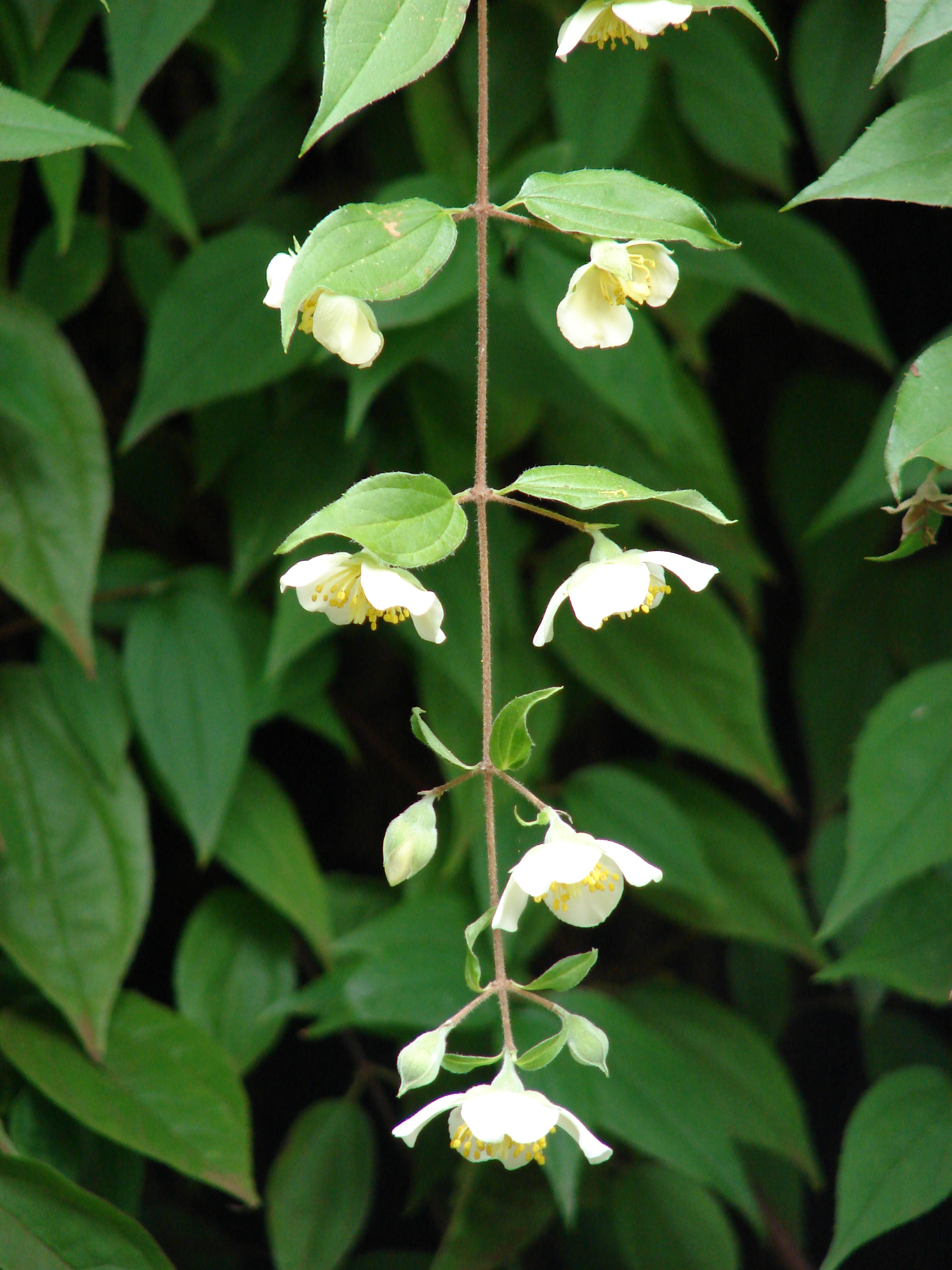
Mexican evergreen mock-orange, Philadelphus karwinskyanus

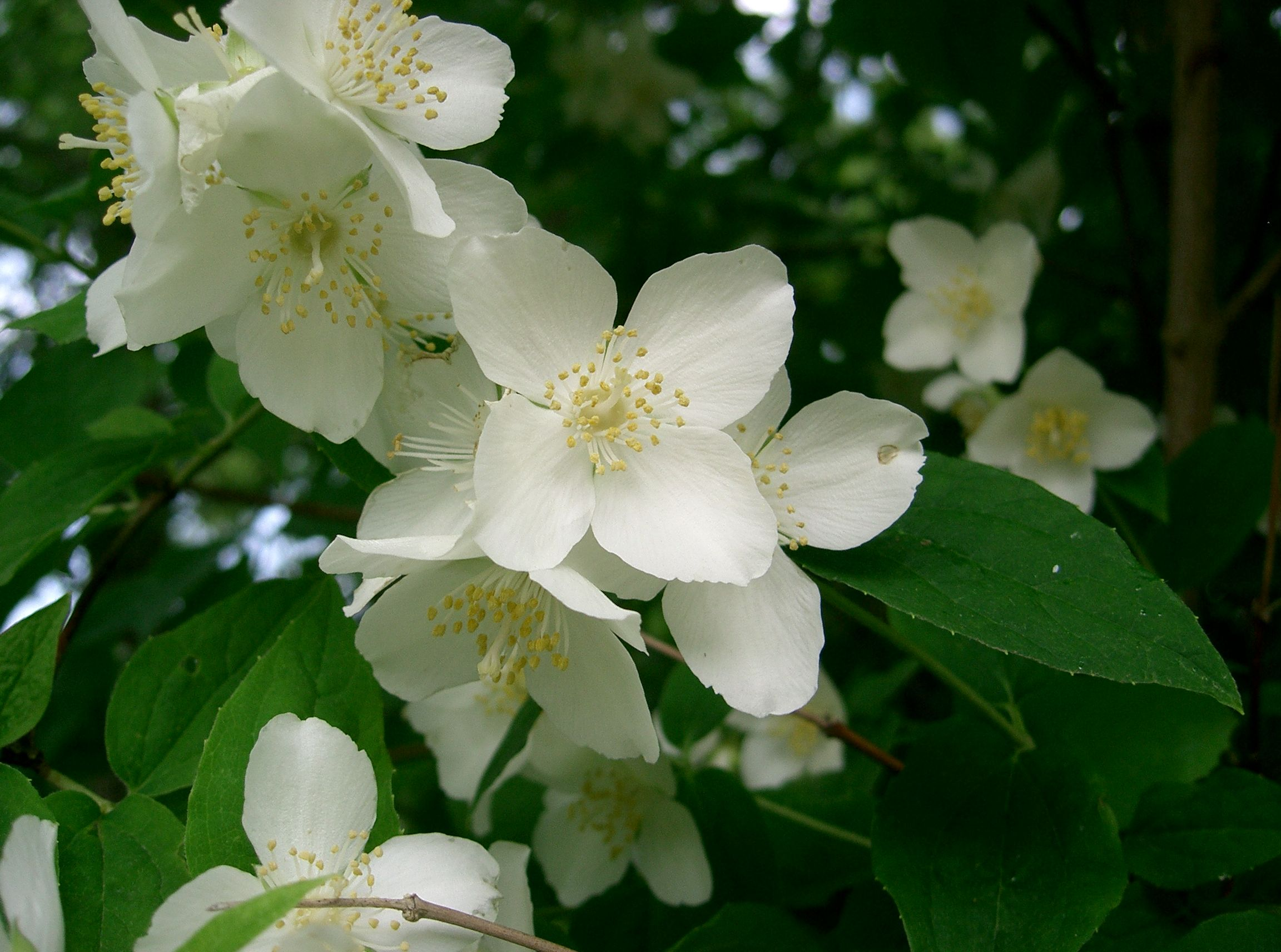
Japanese mock-orange, Philadelphus laxus

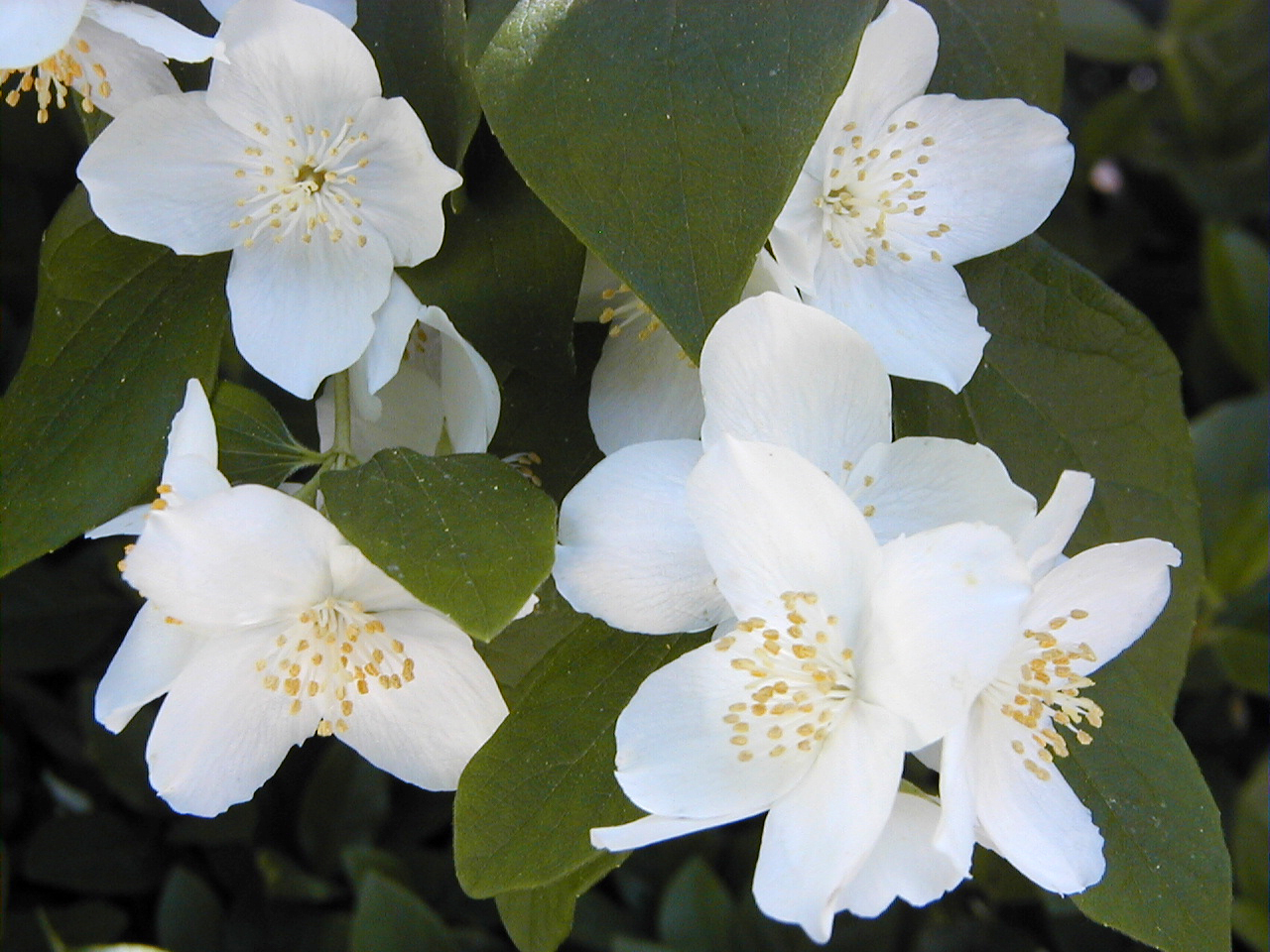
Hoary mock-orange, Philadelphus pubescens

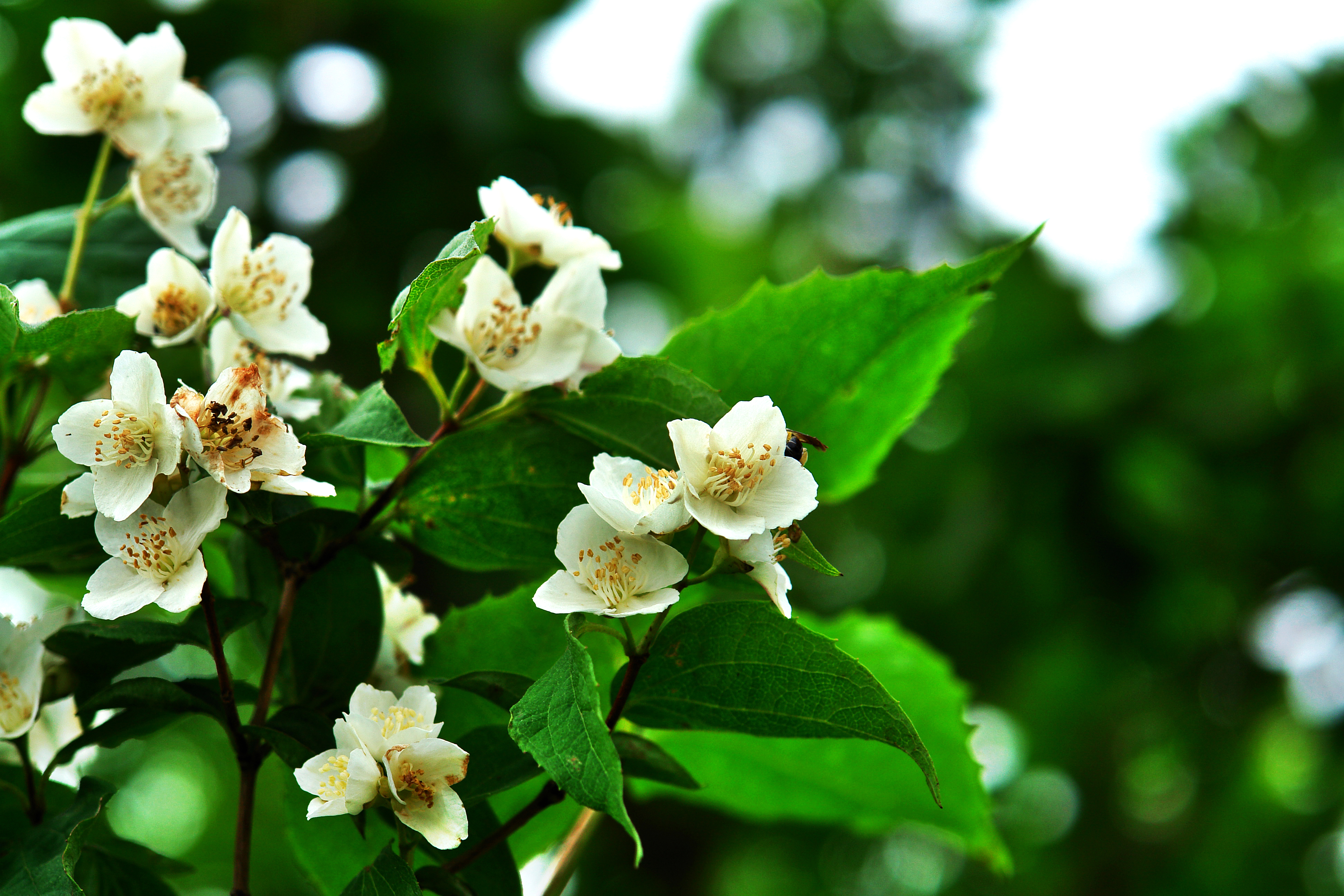
Schrenk's mock-orange, Philadelphus schrenkii

=== Asia ===
- Philadelphus brachybotrys (southeast China)
- Philadelphus delavayi – Delavay's mock-orange (southwest China)
- Philadelphus incanus (Hubei, Shaanxi)
- Philadelphus kansuensis – Chinese evergreen mock-orange (northwest China)
- Philadelphus laxiflorus (Gansu, Hubei, Shaanxi)
- Philadelphus laxus Schrad. ex DC. – Japanese mock-orange (Japan; formerly P. satsumi
- Philadelphus purpurascens (southwest China)
- Philadelphus satsumanus – Downy Japanese mock-orange (Japan)
- Philadelphus schrenkii – Korean mock-orange (northeast China, Korea, southeast Russia)
- Philadelphus sericanthus (Sichuan, Hubei)
- Philadelphus pekinensis – Beijing mock-orange (northern China)
- Philadelphus subcanus (southwest China)
- Philadelphus tenuifolius – Slenderleaf mock-orange (Korea, southeast Russia)
- Philadelphus tomentosus – Fuzzy mock-orange (Himalaya)
- Philadelphus triflorus – Himalayan mock-orange (Himalaya)

=== Europe ===
- Philadelphus caucasicus – Caucasus mock-orange (Caucasus) – likely syn. of P. coronarius
- Philadelphus coronarius – Sweet mock-orange, English Dogwood (southeast Europe)

=== North America ===
- Philadelphus argenteus – Silver mock-orange (California, Baja California)
- Philadelphus argyrocalyx – Silver-cup mock-orange (New Mexico)
- Philadelphus californicus – California mock-orange (California)
- Philadelphus confusus – Piper's mock-orange (California, Washington) – likely syn. of Philadelphus lewisii
- Philadelphus cordifolius – Heartleaf mock-orange (California) – likely syn. of Philadelphus lewisii
- Philadelphus coulteri – Coulter's mock-orange (northeast Mexico)
- Philadelphus crinitus – Hairy mock-orange, Trans-pecos Mock-orange (west Texas) – likely syn. of Philadelphus microphyllus
- Philadelphus ernestii – Canyon mock-orange (southwest U.S.) – likely syn. of Philadelphus texensis var. ernestii
- Philadelphus floridus – Florida mock-orange (Florida, Georgia) – likely syn. of Philadelphus inodorus
- Philadelphus gattingeri – Gattinger's mock-orange (Tennessee) – likely syn. of Philadelphus pubescens
- Philadelphus hirsutus – Streambank mock-orange (southeast US)
- Philadelphus hitchcockianus – Hitchcock's mock-orange (Texas, New Mexico)
- Philadelphus inodorus – Scentless mock-orange (US)
- Philadelphus insignis – Summer mock-orange (California, Oregon)
- Philadelphus intectus (southeast US)
- Philadelphus karwinskyanus – Mexican evergreen mock-orange (Mexico)
- Philadelphus lewisii – Lewis's mock-orange (western North America)
- Philadelphus maculatus (Hitch.) Hu – Spotted mock-orange (Arizona)
- Philadelphus madrensis – Desert mountain mock-orange (southwest US)
- Philadelphus mearnsii – Mearns' mock-orange (Texas, New Mexico)
- Philadelphus mexicanus – Mexican mock-orange (Mexico, Guatemala)
- Philadelphus microphyllus – Littleleaf mock-orange (southwest US)
- Philadelphus occidentalis – Western mock-orange (western North America)
- Philadelphus oreganus – Oregon mock-orange (Oregon)
- Philadelphus palmeri – Palmer's mock-orange (southwest US)
- Philadelphus pubescens – Hoary mock-orange (southeast US)
- Philadelphus pumilus – Dwarf mock-orange (California)
- Philadelphus serpyllifolius – Thymeleaf mock-orange (southern US, Mexico)
- Philadelphus sharpianus – Sharp's mock-orange (Tennessee, Missouri)
- Philadelphus texensis – Texas mock-orange (Texas)
- Philadelphus trichothecus – Columbian mock-orange (British Columbia, northwest US)
- Philadelphus wootonii – Wooton's mock-orange (New Mexico)
- Philadelphus zelleri – Zeller's mock-orange (Washington)

=== Pancontinental hybrids ===
- Philadelphus × lemoinei (horticultural hybrid)
- Philadelphus × purpureomaculatus (horticultural hybrid)
- Philadelphus × virginalis (horticultural hybrid)
