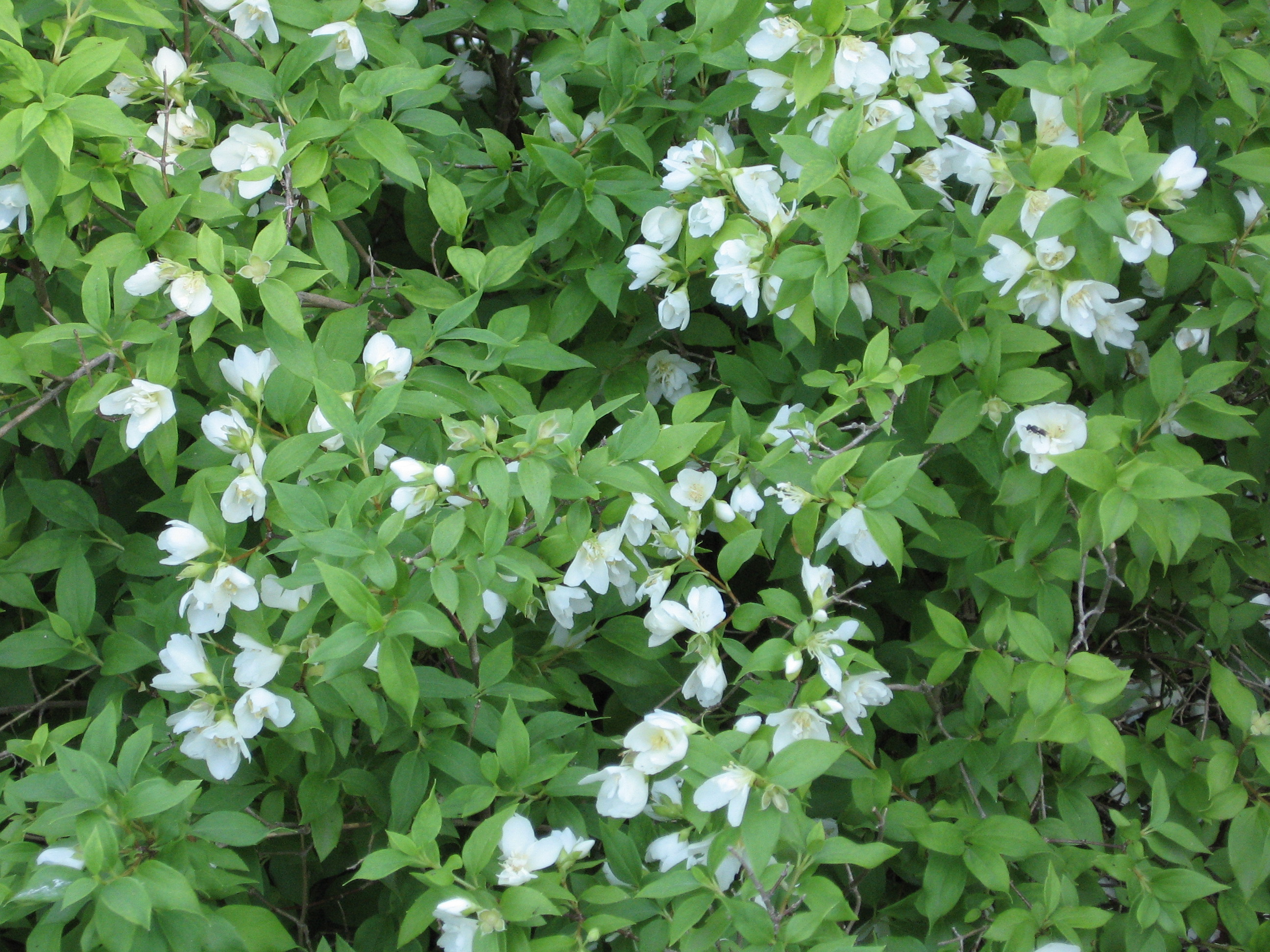

Scientific classification
- Kingdom: Plantae
- Clade: Tracheophytes
- Clade: Angiosperms
- Clade: Eudicots
- Clade: Asterids
- Order: Cornales
- Family: Hydrangeaceae
- Genus: Philadelphus
- Species: P. × lemoinei

Binomial name
- Philadelphus × lemoinei

= Philadelphus × lemoinei =

Species of shrub

Philadelphus × lemoinei is a shrub in the genus Philadelphus. In 1884, Victor Lemoine crossed Philadelphus microphyllus with Philadelphus coronarius and produced this hybrid plant which he named P. lemoinei. The following cultivars have gained the Royal Horticultural Society's Award of Garden Merit:-

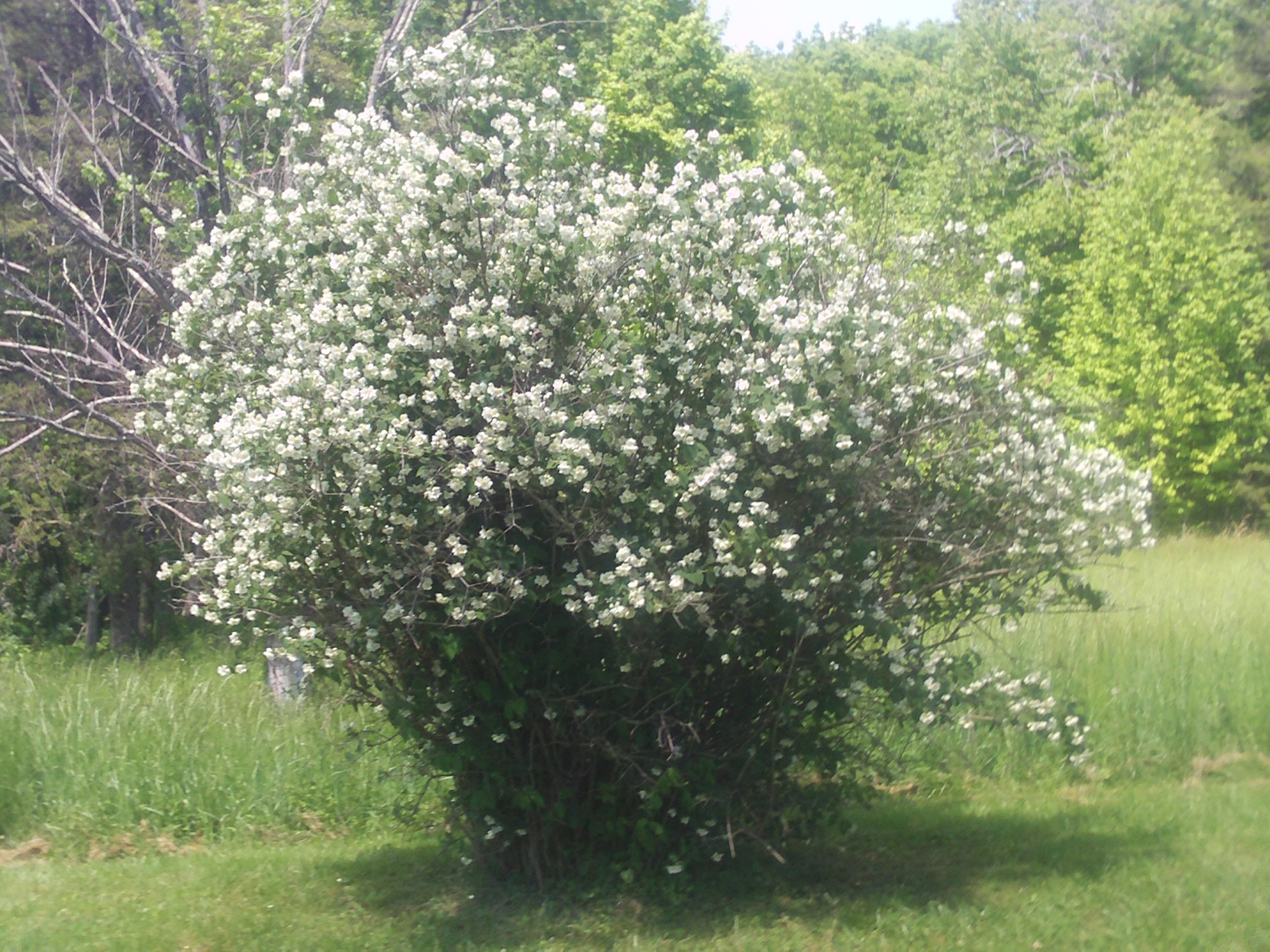
Lemoinei bush

- Philadelphus 'Manteau d'Hermine'
- Philadelphus 'Belle Étoile'
