= Silvestri =

Silvestri is a surname of Italian origin. Noted people with this last name include:

- Alan Silvestri (born 1950), American composer
- Alessandra Silvestri-Levy (born 1972), Italo-Brazilian curator, writer and humanitarian activist
- Angelica di Silvestri (born 1965), Dominican cross-country skier of Italian origin
- Carlos Silvestri (born 1972), Peruvian football manager and former player
- Charles Anthony Silvestri (born 1965), American poet, lyricist and historian
- Constantin Silvestri (1913–1969), Romanian conductor
- Cristian Silvestri (born 1975), Italian footballer
- Daniel Silvestri (born 2002), American racing driver
- Daniele Silvestri (born 1968), Italian singer-songwriter and musician
- Dave Silvestri (born 1967), American baseball player
- Davide Silvestri (born 1980), Italian cyclist
- Debora Silvestri (born 1998), Italian professional racing cyclist
- Enrico Silvestri (1896–1977), Italian Alpini officer and skier
- Federico Silvestri (born 1963), Italian swimmer
- Fernando Silvestri (1896–1959), Italian Air Force general
- Filippo Silvestri (1873–1949), Italian entomologist
- Graciela Silvestri (born 1954), Argentine architect and professor
- Jacobelli Silvestri (died 1516), Italian Roman Catholic bishop
- Jacopo Silvestri (15th–16th century), Italian cryptographer and author
- Ken Silvestri (1916–1992), American baseball player
- Lorenzo De Silvestri (born 1988), Italian footballer
- Louis Silvestri, bass singer with the original Four Aces
- Luigi Silvestri (born 1993), Italian professional footballer
- Marc Silvestri (born 1958), American comic book artist
- Marco Silvestri (born 1991), Italian footballer
- Marco Silvestri (born 1999), Italian footballer
- Nicola Silvestri (born 1985), Italian footballer
- Orazio Silvestri (1835–1890), Italian geologist and volcanologist
- Orlando Silvestri (born 1972), American football player
- Paolo Silvestri (born 1967), Italian freestyle skier
- Papirio Silvestri (1592–1659), Roman Catholic prelate who served as Bishop of Macerata e Tolentino
- Peter N. Silvestri (born 1957), a village president of Elmwood Park and a commissioner of Cook County, Illinois
- Russ Silvestri (born 1961), American sailor
- Tommaso Silvestri (born 1990), Italian footballer
- Umberto Silvestri (1915–2009), Italian wrestler

== See also ==
- Silvestrii (disambiguation)
- Silvestris (disambiguation)
