= James Pass Arboretum =

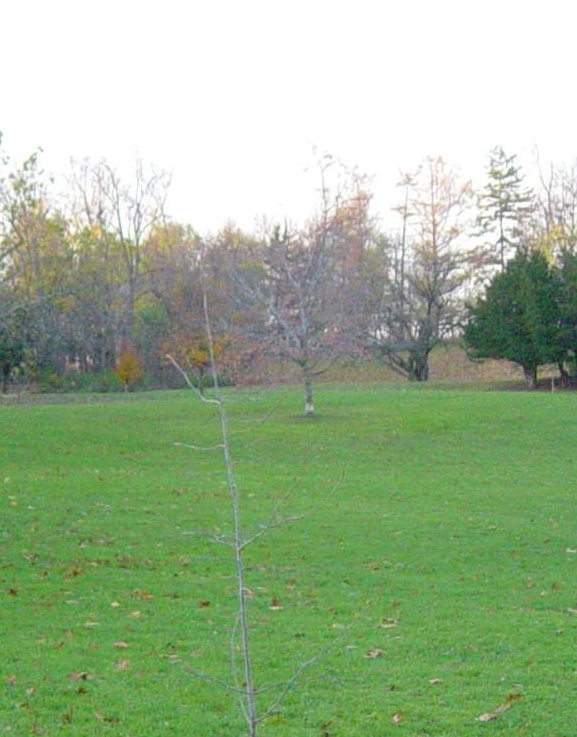
- James Pass Arboretum

- Location within New York
- 43°2′36″N 76°11′27″W
- Location: Bounded by Salisbury Road on south, S. Avery Ave. on east, Tompkins St. on north and town of Geddes on west Syracuse, New York

History
- Built: March 21, 1925

Site notes
- Area: 12.1 acres (4.9 ha)
- Governing body: City of Syracuse

The James Pass Arboretum was established by the City of Syracuse, New York, through the philanthropy of Adelaide Salisbury Pass and family with the guidance and cooperation of the State College of Forestry (now SUNY-ESF) to be a classic arboretum in the tradition of the Arnold Arboretum in Boston, Massachusetts, that is, a museum of woody plants designed for education and horticultural display.

== History ==
On March 22, 1925, Syracuse Mayor John Henry Walrath announced the gift of land consisting of 12.1 acres, adjacent to Burnet Park by Adelaide Pass and family. The land would be used as a municipal arboretum and named for Mrs. Pass' late husband James Pass.

Development would be conducted by the City of Syracuse, New York with the cooperation of the State College of Forestry in Syracuse, today called State University of New York College of Environmental Science and Forestry. From statements made by Mayor Walrath, F. Franklin Moon, Dean of the State University of New York College of Environmental Science and Forestry and Adelaide Pass there was agreement that the James Pass Arboretum would be a classic arboretum in the tradition of the Arnold Arboretum in Boston MA. and Highland Park in Rochester NY. It would be an outdoor museum of woody plants displayed for educational and horticultural purposes, to serve as a demonstration ground for students, homeowners, commercial growers, and horticulturalists. That objective was confirmed by Mayor Charles Hanna in 1927 when he stated that "it was expected that the arboretum would be used by the forestry and landscapes departments of the Forestry College and by public school classes".

=== James and Adelaide Pass ===
In 1884 James Pass succeeded his father Richard Pass as superintendent and eventually president of the Onondaga Pottery Company which ultimately became Syracuse China. In 1890 he formed a partnership with A. P. Seymour, Pass & Seymour which manufactured porcelain and electric supplies. He served as president of the U. S. Potters Association and was known to have manufactured the first X-ray machine in the Syracuse area. James Pass married Adelaide Salisbury in 1890 and had three children: Eleanor S, Richard Henry and James Salisbury.

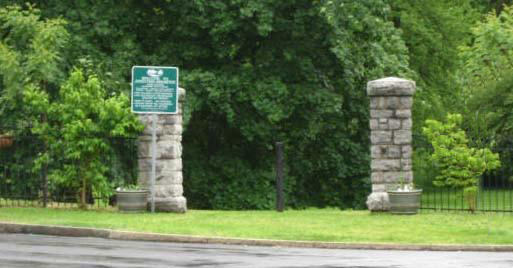
Entrance on corner of Avery Avenue and Tompkins Street

James Pass died in 1913.

Mrs. Pass died 19 months after making her gift to the city. Her November 10, 1926 obituary describes her as a benefactor of worthy charity and invariably associated with every movement designed to increase health, comfort, and happiness of the less fortunate element of the community. Few women gave so freely and helpfully of money or time to charitable work in this generation.

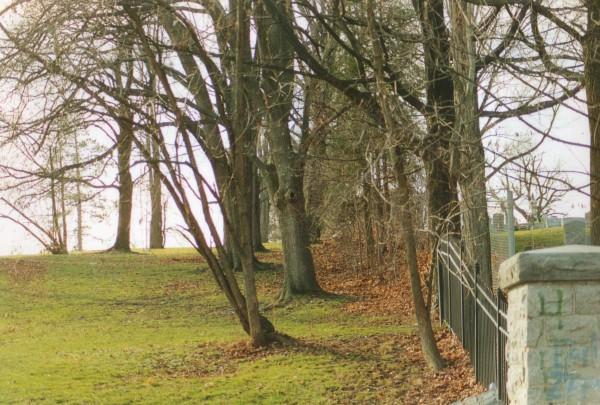
Northern border of park, Myrtle Hill Cemetery on right of fence

=== Early development ===
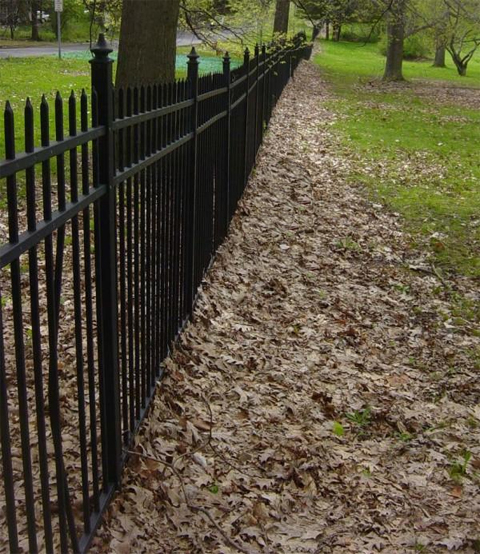
Pass' Field in the autumn photo taken4-27-08

In 1926 plans were drawn by Harold A. Smith and Clarence E. Howard A survey was completed during early summer of 1926.

Grading was completed during the summer of 1927 so that planting could begin that Fall. Planting of 56 trees provided by members of the Pass family had begun by November 5, 1927. Individuals and organizations had also offered trees to be planted as memorials.

On December 9, 1928, Clarence E. Howard, chief engineer with the planning, parks and recreation commission, submitted a 5-year plan of development to Mayor Charles Hanna. The first two improvements were to be construction of water mains and laterals on the grounds and erection of an ornamental fence. The plan called for 100 trees to be planted annually. Later it was planned to complete the drainage system and develop a series of walks. A lake with floral display was also contemplated. Establishment of a shrub garden and erection of a comfort station and work room would complete the project. 14 The commission of the Arboretum recommended that each year a very substantial amount be included in the bond issue for the maintenance and growth of the Arboretum until it became fully established. The property was formally annexed by the city in early 1929.

During the summer of 1929 the arboretum was fenced.

In October 1929 the stock market crashed and there is little documentation of progress on the 5-year plan. Most of the work documented in news reports was labor-intensive work relief projects including grading, some planting and installation of a pond with fountain in the northeast corner.

Nationwide, growth of cities, increased leisure time, rising unemployment, elimination of streets as safe play areas and increased number of retired people were all factors in the perceived need for new recreation facilities. In many cases expansions of parks was funded by the federal government which placed recreation facility development near the top of its expenditure list. Money literally poured into subsidized recreation park design and construction, often through WPA projects.

Syracuse's century of progress dating from the arrival of the Erie Canal came to an end with the stock market crash in 1929. During the 1930s, the city's population decreased slightly, businesses suffered, the tax base declined and unemployment grew rapidly. Abandoning its earlier efforts at comprehensive planning, the city dissolved its planning commission in 1932 and turned its attention to relief programs for the thousands without jobs.

The Tuesday following Black Tuesday was election day and Syracuse elected Rowland Bristol Marvin as its new mayor. Mayor Marvin had run a campaign based upon "orderly retrenchment" and "to spend less money".

=== Post-development period 1935–1964 ===
The Protected Site Application 1994, Revisioning an Historic Landscape 1994 and No Effort Wasted 2007 each cite the original planting plan to identify "the number of proposed taxa of trees totaled approximately four hundred and seventy four (474) representing around one hundred (100) deciduous tree species and sixty (60) coniferous tree species. And the number of proposed shrubs and small trees totaled two hundred (200) species. In addition to the tree and shrub species there were seventy six (76) proposed vines of thirteen (13) different species and the combined number of proposed perennial and ground cover species was thirty two (32). . But those figures do not add up. It seems that one miscounted and the others used those figures. Another count of Appendix C of the Protected Site Application and Appendix E of Revisioning an Historic Landscape, which appear to be identical show the plan to be for 282 deciduous trees of 141 taxa, 428 conifers of 93 taxa, 3,250 shrubs of 276 taxa, 76 vines of 13 taxa and ground cover taxa to be 32 for a total of 555 woody plant species. In addition the formal shrub and hedge display section 5C of the original plan was not included in either of those appendices. Section 5C planned for 1,741 shrubs, sub-shrubs, vines and ground covers of 139 taxa. Using the plant list Appendix C from the Protected Site Application and the plant list from Sec 5c it would be more accurate to say that the original plan called for 5,000 - 6,000 woody plants of over 600 species.

Aerial photographs taken in 1938 and 1964 show no significant development of the collection in the James Pass Arboretum other than trees planted before the 1938 photograph had grown.

In Revisioning an Historic Landscape the author states that only a portion of the plants in the original plan were planted and that it was not clear from the photographs how many of the shrub species had been established.

In the Protected Site Application, the author notes, that planting had been complete by the time of the 1938 photograph. He notes that there had been a dramatic loss in species diversity by 1994 estimating that there was at least 200 trees of over 70 species and that approximately 65% of the trees present at the time of his study date back to the original planting circa 1927. He states further that of the 474 taxa on the 1927 plan 137 were present at that time. The map attached to the application showed 148 specimens of 70 species from the original planting present in 1994. He also concludes that "it is certainly possible, if not likely, that only a portion of the trees shown on the original plan ever made it into the ground".

In an April 26, 1996 newspaper article Lyle Halbert of the Parks Dept. uses the same figures as the Walmsely & Co Survey for the original 1927 planting to be 112 trees of 57 species.

In December 1936 William Gould Vinal, who had been on the faculty of the NYS College of Forestry in 1925 when plans for the arboretum were announced, wrote an article on the educational benefits of CNY parks. He sited the Dr. Edmund M. Mills rose garden in Thornden Park and noted that a Rhododendron-Azalia-Mountain Laurel thicket was planned and that in cooperation with the State University of New York College of Environmental Science and Forestry a Pinetum will also be an attraction at Thornden Park. Dr. Vinal mentioned the George Washington Memorial forest in Burnet Park, Clark Reservation State Park and Green Lakes State Parkas outdoor classrooms for nature education. No where in the article did Dr. Vinal mention the James Pass Arboretum.

A 1940 article by Frank J. Early in the Syracuse Herald Journal refers to the James Pass Arboretum as a tree sanctuary and future botanical and horticultural garden, which suggests that in 1940 the arboretum was far from actualized.

In April 1939 the Garden Gate Club donated six Magnolias to the James Pass Arboretum. A Garden Journal article in 1940 confirmed that planting but the 1967 survey by Dr Miller and Dr. Viertel of SUNY ESF notes only one Magnolia present a Magnolia stellata. The 1994 map shows no Magnolias.

The period between 1935 and 1964 have been described as "thirty fallow years. It could be said that after its establishment as an arboretum, the site directly acquired a park-like status both in terms of its management and use. Management of the site by the Parks Dept. revolved around the basic regimen of mowing, perennial pruning and removal of dead plantings. And the site was used primarily as a park by the residents of the area who continued to call it 'Pass' Field'".

At some time during the 1960s, citing public safety, the shrub layer was removed. "Hedges and informal shrub and perennial groupings formerly lined all paths but these were removed by the 1960s. The loss of this vast array of shrubbery is perhaps the greatest change to the arboretum's character."

The City of Syracuse has no records to indicate that the arboretum was ever planted as planned. Every indication is that by 1938 the public had shown little interest in the partially planted arboretum, and for that reason it was used almost exclusively as a park. There is no record of the arboretum having been used in compliance with its original educational or scientific mission. Every indication is that the community and the City of Syracuse, New York abandoned the James Pass Arboretum as an arboretum.

The planning parks and recreation commission which, in the fall of 1927, strongly recommended that each year a substantial amount be included in the bond issue for maintenance was dissolved in 1932. Without that funding for maintenance and development, maintenance consisted of cutting grass and removing dead trees. The problems that rose in the 1960s, 1970s and to the present all seem to be a result of the city's omissions during the 1930s.

=== Attempts at restoration, revitalization and development ===
At many times during the recent decades the arboretum has been the focus of renewed planning activity. While continuing to manage the arboretum and other green spaces as components of the overall Syracuse park system, the Parks Department has regularly permitted the involvement of community groups and other interested parties in implementation of specific landscape improvement projects. Pass Arboretum, like other city parks, has been the subject of several such public/private collaborations. Some projects were intended to restore the site's original mission of horticultural display and education, while other projects were more concerned with the deterioration of the site as a neighborhood park. While most rehabilitation projects have been short-lived, their cumulative effect over the decades has been substantial.

=== Botany Club SUNY-ESF 1967–1968 ===
"In May 1967 a rehabilitation project of the arboretum was initiated by the State University of New York College of Environmental Science and Forestry Botany Club under the guidance of Prof. Edwin H. Ketchledge and with the collaboration of James Heath, Commissioner of the Parks and Recreation Department. The efforts of the Botany Club were not merely aimed at new additions. Central to this project was the vision of re-instating the arboretum's functional mission of educational and horticultural display. Despite an enthusiastic start, the rehabilitation project, was abandoned a year and a half later in the wake of repeated incidents of vandalism. It was Dr. Ketchledges's strong belief that the persistent problem of vandalism was closely related to the issue of maintenance in the sense that vandalism could be addressed and decreased only if the Parks Department seriously took on the responsibility of increased maintenance and supervision."

Maintenance efforts by the Botany Club included tree pruning, removal of dead plants, and clearing of volunteer specimens from unmown areas and around the bases of existing trees. Volunteer species include common invasive native plants such as mulberry, boxelder, black cherry, and Norway maple as well as specimens of mountain ash, red oak, English oak and others.

=== Men's Garden Club of Syracuse 1972–1974 ===
It was the wish of the Men's Garden Club of Syracuse to commemorate past members with memorial tree plantings. Billed as a long range revitalization effort, the city supported the club's proposal and agreed to match the club's contribution ($500. each year for five years) to the cost of plantings. By 1974 the collaboration between the Garden Club and the city had soured. The club believed that the arboretum was a low priority for the city and they realized that their $500.00 each year would make very little impact on the arboretum. There was a big difference in the Botany Club Project and that of the Garden Club in that the Botany Club attempted to direct the arboretum back to its original mission. Contributions by the Garden Club were for the most part common street trees that added very little interest to the plant collection.

=== City of Syracuse 1984–1986 ===
In April 1985 Councilor James T. Walsh was successful in encouraging the Common Council to appropriate $90,000.00 for the restoration of the arboretum ("Restoration of Pass,"). Most of the money was used to replace the iron fence and repair the stone piers. David Tessier, the city's director of planning and development, notified the College of Forestry that the remaining funds of approximately $9,000, would be available for re-establishing the original planting plans, and he requested assistance from the college in choosing plant species. The extent to which this intention was carried out remains unverified since no records were found of any additional plantings during this period.

At this time just as in the 1960s the community and the Parks Department saw the arboretum as "Pass' Field" "a park for use" with little regard for the plant collection. The fence had become an eyesore and it was the focus of "Restoration of Pass". In 1968 Parks Commissioner Heath had recommended that the fence be removed. Mayor William F. Walsh did not act on that recommendation. Whether there would be any public perception that a "Restoration of Pass" would be necessary had Commissioner Heath's recommendation been heeded remains to be seen. As the replacement fence ages it requires more maintenance.

During the mid-80s restoration Dick Case of the Syracuse Herald Journal wrote in a July 8, 1985 column "If there is a project worth doing, it is a campaign to make the James Pass Arboretum what it was meant to be." Apparently Case, did not realize that there was absolutely no demand for an arboretum in the community and the closer people were to Pass' Field the less likely they would be to see an arboretum as a great cultural advancement. In the column Case cites Parks Planning Chief David Tessier as saying "the work was done in yearly phases and all of the work was completed". Tessier's statement conflicts with the assessments made by the authors of REVISIONING AN HISTORIC LANDSCAPE THE JAMES PASS ARBORETUM and PROTECTED SITE APPLICATION PART C, SECTION VII ZONING RULES AND REGULATIONS for Syracuse Landmark Preservation Board, the 1991 Walmsely Survey and the city's 2001 Community Forest Restoration Project Resource Guide all of whom state that it is likely that only a portion was planted . Once again the omissions of the city after the 1932 dissolution of the planning board is the basis of the problems in subsequent decades.

=== USDA-Forest Service N.E. Forest Experiment Station 1991–1994 ===
In 1991 Walmsley & Co. completed a survey of four Syracuse Parks as historic landscapes and one of those parks was Pass Arboretum. There were conflicting deductions in the survey but among the observations was that "Although this 'park' has lost a significant number of species, it is still a pleasing landscape with above-average diversity of trees which makes it an interesting collection. Certainly, the educational purposes could be augmented with name tags, nature trails and supplementary plantings. If its original function can be reinstated, as is strongly suggested, then its landmark consideration merits favorable review."

It seems that the involvement of the USDA Forest Service was a direct response to that recommendation. In 1992 a proposal made by the USDA Forest Service NE Forest Experiment Station to the NE/NA Civil Rights Committee to provide funds for tree ID labels, a trail brochure and display boards, was approved along with $1,200.00 funding. Identification labels for thirty highlighted species were installed on Arbor Day 1993. Also on that day the Parks Dept installed a wooden box for the brochures. A display case was later installed in spring of 1994. "The project proved to be the most effective effort to date to restore the arboretum's original mission of public education." Vandalism of labels which occurs once in a while had been somewhat counteracted by the persistent efforts of the Forest Experiment station staff members to replace damaged or missing labels. A vandalism resistant label was used and many remain intact in 2013. while some have been vandalized The Forest Service's involvement ended once the arboretum became a protected site. There is no one servicing tags which can become a problem as trees grow.

=== Protected historic landmark designation ===
On November 30, 1994, just four months after the application Gary Gerew of the Syracuse Herald Journal wrote that the Syracuse Parks Department and the City Department of Community Development received approval of the city planning commission to designate five parks as protected historic landmarks. The James Pass Arboretum was one of those sites. Lyle Halbert a Landscape Architect with the Parks Department explained that it was to keep the land from future development. "I think this designation will give the areas a little more sense of presence and let people know what jewels these spots are." On the arboretum Halbert said "it has never really assumed its full potential as an arboretum".

The James Pass Arboretum was determined to be historically significant by its association with James Pass a historically significant person and because it is "locally significant as one of the only examples in Syracuse of a landscape designed primarily for educational purposes."

=== Volunteer arborists April 20, 1996 ===
Michael Grimm and a group of fellow New York State Arborists "took their saws and bucket trucks to Pass to give some hurting and hoary trees much-needed care. They trimmed dead limbs so they wouldn't fall on someone's head — hazard trimming — and thinned trees whose branches had grown into a light-blocking tangle." "Lots more could be done there," Grimm said. "Fact of the matter is, the Pass Arboretum has been neglected for many, many years." Lyle Halbert, the city's landscape architect, wouldn't argue. "We do what we can," he said on a walk through the arboretum one gray, chilly day. The city tree crew is spread thin, caring for trees that line city streets and shade its 80-odd, mostly small parks. Halbert would like to see people who walk their dogs or let their kids play at Pass care more for the place, "watch over it".

=== Neighborhood citizen volunteers 1997-2006 ===
An article in the May–June Upstate Gardener's Journal on Pass Arboretum described the ten year experience between 1997 and 2006 of Tim Regin of Tipperary Hill in his effort to revitalize the arboretum.

His experience in the Arnold Arboretum in Boston, where he was a "Friend of the Arnold Arboretum" and Highland Park in Rochester, where he was a member of the" Highland Park Conservancy", led him to believe that the people of Syracuse had been deprived of the kind of enrichment that was enjoyed by the people of Boston and Rochester.

He began modestly by attending the annual plant sale at the Arnold Arboretum where he would acquire woody plants to donate to the Pass Arboretum. He used his yard as a nursery to develop that plant material for transplant.

In 2000 he was told that the Arboretum had been designated a historical protected site and that nothing could be planted that was not part of the original planting. He then asked for and copied the original plan plans drawn by Harold A. Smith and Clarence E. Howard in 1926.

Study of that plan confirmed his belief that the people of Syracuse had been impoverished by the city's failures.

From that time until December 2006 he used the Smith-Howard plan as a template for development and concentrated on the acquisition of woody plants that had been planned.

Mr. Regin was a member and participant in CANOPY a group of volunteers working in public green spaces and in 2002 he was in the first class of Communitree Stewards a volunteer group operating through Cornell Cooperative Extension where in 2002 he was singled out for recognition for sheer volume of volunteer work. On a number of occasions he received correspondence from the Parks Department, Community Groups and other government entities which identified him as the Steward of the James Pass Arboretum a position that he never sought. A February 2002 service plan was completed using an adopt-a-lot application.

During 2001 and 2002 he attended several workshops in Woody Plant Propagation at the Arnold Arboretum. He had established relationships with staff at the Arnold Arboretum and Highland Park and was confident that he could acquire seeds and/or cuttings so that in time and adequate nursery space he could complete the collection at the James Pass Arboretum

Also in 2000 he acquired approval to remove woody invasive growth beginning with growth that was causing actual damage to specimens in the living collection of the arboretum and may ultimately displace those specimens. Later he cleared areas of feral growth because it was unsightly.

Once cleared of woody invasive he would weed those areas while working to establish ground cover to discourage the regeneration of feral growth.

He would mulch the area around young trees so that lawn machines would not have to get close. Still in 2002 five trees were killed by reckless maintenance For that reason he took additional steps to discourage damage. It was his belief that the recklessness of individuals was less a problem than the method and incentives of maintenance.

After much frustration, in October 2004 he made a presentation to the Tipperary Hill Neighborhood Association in an attempt to show the benefit to the neighborhood that the arboretum, if saved and developed could provide.This beautiful arboretum would develop into a wonderful dog park.

It was his belief at the time that the Association responded with enthusiasm and expressed an intention to be helpful. While they expressed doubt that they had many members with the skill and knowledge to help with much they would at least annually rake leaves and pick up the area so that it would look better. The Association also began beautification of the grounds with flowers. By the end of 2006 the association was able to convince Commissioner of Parks Patrick Driscoll that they were better suited to beautify the 'park' than Mr Regin and that he was not sufficiently supportive of beautification.

It had been his wish to stop the destruction of the arboretum by eliminating the proliferation of self seeded woody plants, bolstering maintenance to create conditions that would mitigate damage from reckless maintenance. Develop the living collection of the arboretum by purchase and propagation of new plant material using the 1926 Smith-Howard plan as a guide.

=== Save the Rain - Onondaga County ===
"Save the Rain" is a green infrastructure program initiated by Onondaga County to bring the county into compliance with a consent judgment to protect Onondaga Lake. The county was able to get Federal and State Funding to divert rain run-off rain with associated pollutants away from storm sewers and ultimately Onondaga Lake particularly during heavy rainstorms or snowmelt.

The flower gardens at the arboretum are big—the larger one is 93,000 square feet, the smaller is 25,000 square feet—and contain about 20,000 plants according to Zach Monge. The two rain gardens were estimated to capture 746,000 gallons of water annually at an estimated cost of $316,420. This project was designed with consideration for historic preservation and was approved by the City of Syracuse Landmark Preservation Board. The new plantings in Pass Arboretum were chosen according to the vegetation historically found in this park.

Project management used a news story in the Syracuse New Times to explain the project to the community.

The article describes the arboretum as a "12 acre tree preserve". The planners operating with the belief that the neighborhood has " strong affinity for the rolling landscape of the little park," sought "buy in" from the Tipperary Hill Neighborhood Association. and were influenced by the Association's belief that the little park should be beautified with flowers to be more suitable for recreational use.

== Plantings ==
=== Deciduous trees ===
By 2010, some of the varieties of trees that remained included a wide list of trees and shrubs. Some of the trees and shrubs were labeled, however, much of the signage "vanished years ago."

- Acer campestre - Field Maple
- Acer negundo - Boxelder Maple
- Acer platanoides - Norway Maple
- Acer platanoides 'Schwedleri' Schwedler Maple
- Acer rubrum - Red Maple
- Acer saccharum - Sugar Maple
- Acer saccharinum - Silver Maple
- Acer tataricum - Tatarian Maple
- Amelanchier arborea - Shadblow
- Betula papyrifera - Paper Birch
- Betula nigra - River Birch
- Carya laciniosa - Shellbark Hickory
- Catalpa bungei - Manchurian Catalpa
- Celtis occidentalis - Hackberry
- Chionanthus virginicus - White Fringetree
- Cladrastis kentukea - Yellowwood
- Crataegus crus-galli - Cockspur Hawthorne
- Crataegus mollis - Downy Hawthorne aka Crataegus arkansana
- Crataegus nitida - Glossy Hawthorne
- Crataegus phaenopyrum - Washington Hawthorne
- Diospyros virginiana - Persimmon
- Fagus grandifolia - American Beech
- Fagus sylvatica - European beech
- Fraxinus excelsior - European Ash
- Fraxinus pennsylvanica - Green Ash
- Ginkgo biloba - Ginkgo
- Gleditsia triacanthos - Honeylocust
- Gymnocladus dioicus - Kentucky coffeetree
- Juglans cinerea - Butternut
- Juglans nigra - Black Walnut
- Kalopanax pictus - Castor Aralia
- Liriodendron tulipifera - Tuliptree
- Magnolia x soulangeana - Saucer Magnolia
- Malus spp. - Crabapple
- Morus alba - White Mulberry
- Nyssa sylvatica - Tupelo
- Phellodendron amurense - Amur Corktree
- Platanus × hispanica - London plane
- Platanus occidentalis - Sycamore
- Populus deltoides - Eastern Cottonwood
- Prunus serotina - Black Cherry
- Prunus triloba - Double-flowering Plum
- Pyrus calleryana - Callery Pear
- Pyrus pyrifolia - Chinese Sand Pear
- Pyrus ussuriensis - Ussurian Pear
- Quercus alba - White Oak
- Quercus bicolor - Swamp White Oak
- Quercus coccinea - Scarlet Oak
- Quercus imbricaria - Laurel Oak
- Quercus macrocarpa - Bur Oak
- Quercus palustris - Pin Oak
- Quercus prinus - Chestnut Oak
- Quercus robur - English Oak
- Quercus rubra - Red Oak
- Quecus velutina - Black Oak
- Robinia pseudoacacia - Black Locust
- Rhus copallinum - Shiny Sumac
- Tilia americana - Basswood
- Tilia cordata - Small-leaved Lime
- Ulmus pumila - Siberian Elm

=== Conifers ===
- Abies concolor - white fir
- Chamaecyparis lawsoniana - Port Orford Cedar
- Chamaecyparis obtusa - Hinoki Falsecypress
- Chamaecyparis pisifera 'Filifera' - Threadleaf Falsecypress
- Chamaecyparis pisifera 'Plumosa' - Plume Falsecypress
- Juniperus chinensis - Chinese Juniper
- Larix kaempferi - Japanese Larch
- Metasequoia glyptostroboides - Dawn Redwood
- Picea abies - Norway Spruce
- Picea engelmanii - Engelmann Spruce
- Picea glauca - White Spruce
- Picea omorika - Serbian Spruce
- Picea pungens - Colorado Spruce
- Picea sitchensis - Sitka Spruce

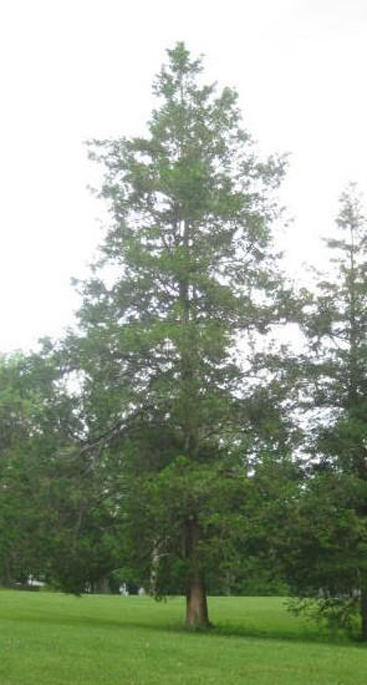
Port Oxford Cedar

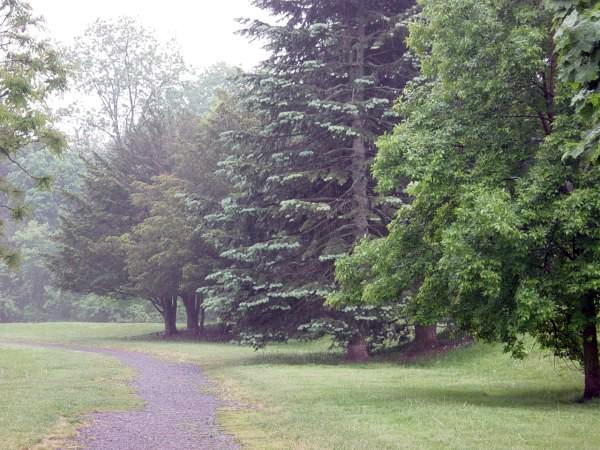
Conifers and Pine near Avery Avenue

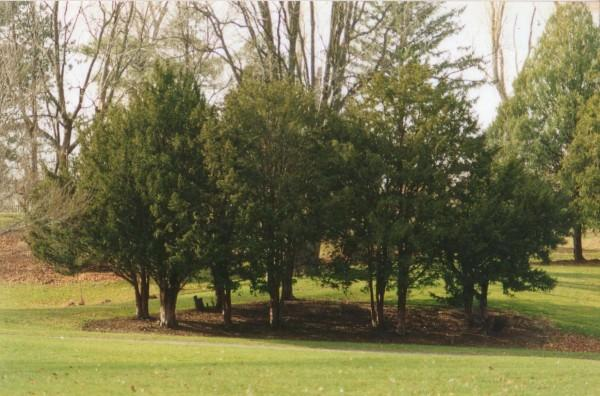
James Pass Arboretum - Yew copse

- Pinus nigra - Austrian Black Pine
- Pinus resinosa - Red Pine
- Pinus sylvestris - Scots Pine
- Platycladus orientalis - Oriental Arborvitae Oriental Arborvitae
- Pseudotsuga menziesii - Douglas-fir
- Taxodium ascendens - Pondcypress
- Taxodium distichum - Baldcypress
- Taxus cuspidata - Japanese Yew
- Thuja occidentalis - Eastern Arborvitae
- Thuja plicata - Western Arborvitae
- Thuja standishii - Japanese Arborvitae

=== Shrubs, small trees and vines ===
The arboretum also has shrubs, vines and plantings such as;

- Amelanchier canadensis - Shadbush Serviceberry
- Cornus alternifolia - Pagoda Dogwood -
- Cornus florida - Flowering Dogwood
- Cornus sericea - Redosier Dogwood
- Deutzia scabra - Pride of Rochester
- Deutzia gracilis - Slender Deutzia
- Diervilla lonicera - Bush Honeysuckle
- Eleutherococcus sieboldianus - 5 leaf aralia
- Forsythia x intermedia - Border Forsythia
- Hibiscus syriacus - Rose of Sharon
- Hydrangea paniculata - Panicle Hydrangea
- Kolkwitzia amabilis - Beauty Bush
- Lonicera tatarica - Honeysuckle
- Parthenocissus quinquefolia - Virginia Creeper
- Philadelphus coronarius- Sweet Mockorange
- Philadelphus x lemoine- Lemoine Mockorange
- Philadelphus virginalis - Virginal Mockorange
- Rhamnus cathartica - Common Buckthorn
- Rubus - Blackberry
- Viburnum lentago - Nannyberry
- Vitis vinifera - Grape

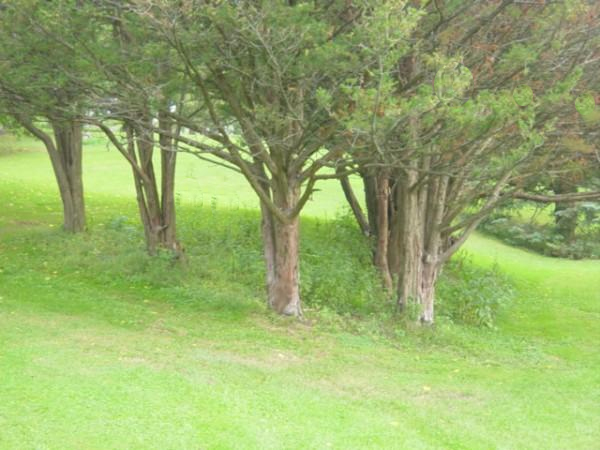
Groundcovers
