= D. silvestrii =

D. silvestrii may refer to:

- Deutzia silvestrii, a plant species
- Dongmoa silvestrii, a harvestman species found in Tonking
- Dongmolla silvestrii, a harvestman species

== See also ==
- Silvestrii (disambiguation)
