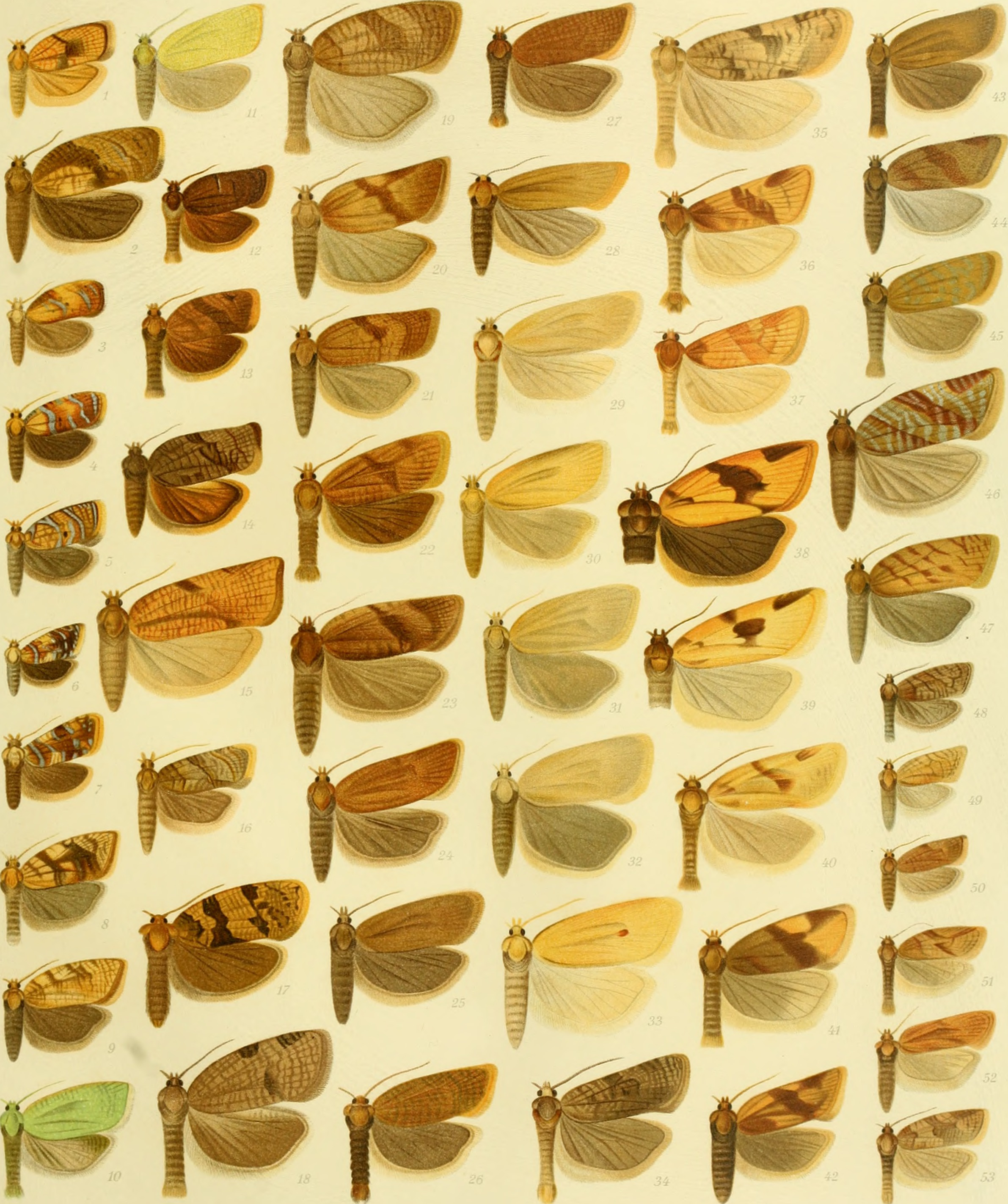
- Acleris askoldana in Kennel Die palaearktischen tortriciden figure 4 female

Scientific classification
- Domain: Eukaryota
- Kingdom: Animalia
- Phylum: Arthropoda
- Class: Insecta
- Order: Lepidoptera
- Family: Tortricidae
- Genus: Acleris
- Species: A. askoldana

Binomial name
- Acleris askoldana (Christoph, 1881)

Synonyms
- Tortrix askoldana Christoph, 1881; Croesia askoldana; Acleris ascoldana Obraztsov, 1956

= Acleris askoldana =

Species of moth

Acleris askoldana is a species of moth belonging to the family Tortricidae. It is found in Korea, China, Japan and Russia (Askold Island, Amur, Ussuri, Siberia).

The wingspan is about 14 mm (0.55 in).

The larva feeds on various plants including Abelia spathulata and Deutzia species (including Deutzia scabra).
