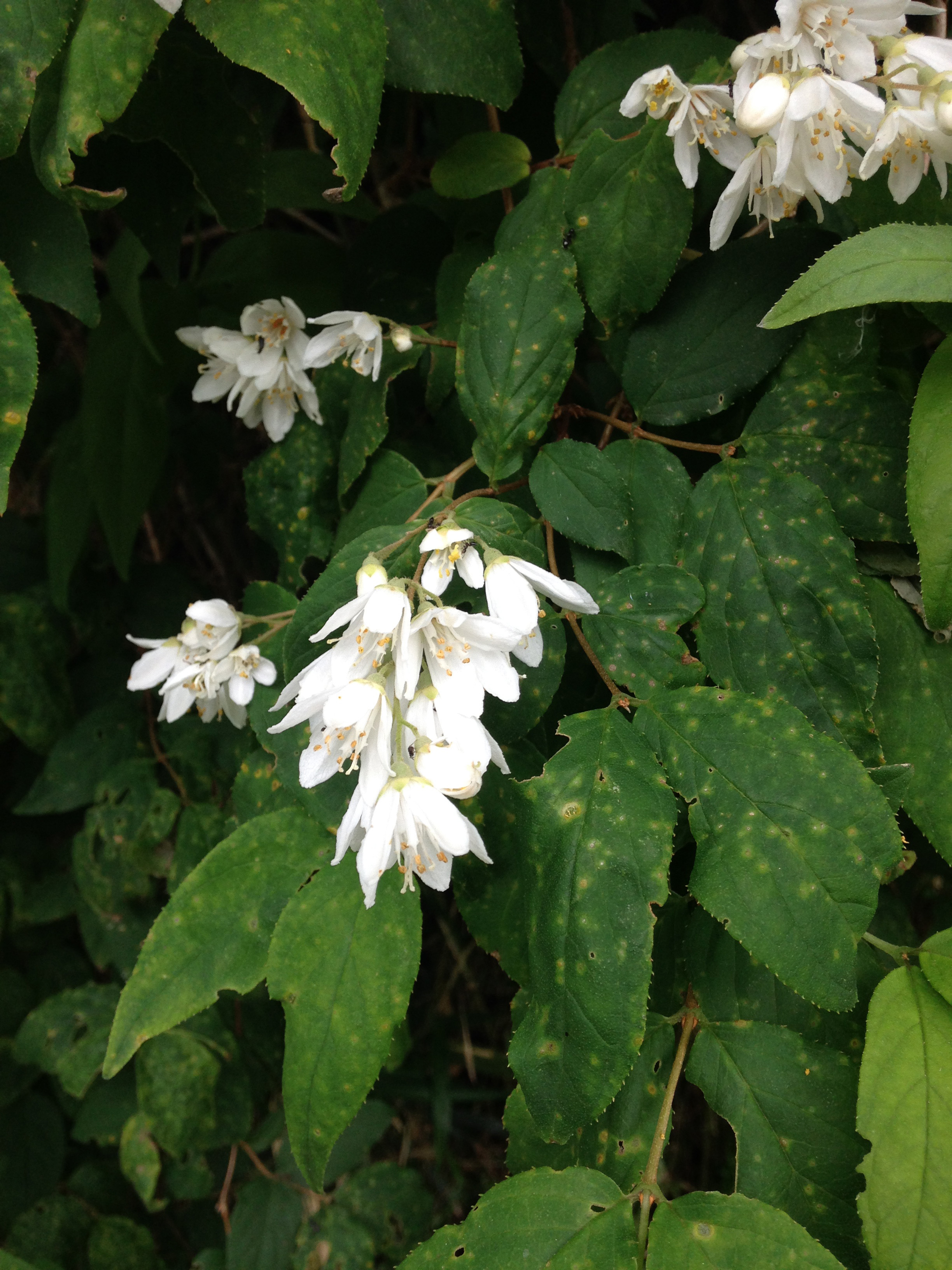

Conservation status
- Least Concern (IUCN 3.1)

Scientific classification
- Kingdom: Plantae
- Clade: Tracheophytes
- Clade: Angiosperms
- Clade: Eudicots
- Clade: Asterids
- Order: Cornales
- Family: Hydrangeaceae
- Genus: Deutzia
- Species: D. crenata

Binomial name
- Deutzia crenata Siebold & Zuccarini

= Deutzia crenata =

Species of flowering plant

Deutzia crenata is a species of flowering shrub in the hydrangea family (Hydrangeaceae). It is native to Japan, where it is called unohana (卯の花, literally "flower of the Month of the Rabbit"), and where it is common and found throughout the country. Its natural habitat is in forest edges and cliffs. It has been commonly cultivated outside its native range, and has naturalized from plantings in China and North America.

Deutzia crenata is a deciduous shrub. Its leaves are opposite, dentate, and rather thickened. In contrast to the similar Deutzia scabra, its leaves are not notably Nita’s diamorphic and are found on short petioles throughout the length of the stem. In addition, all of the filaments of Deutzia crenata are toothed. In Japan, this species produces flowers from May to July.

A form with doubled flowers (forma plena) is popular in gardens.
