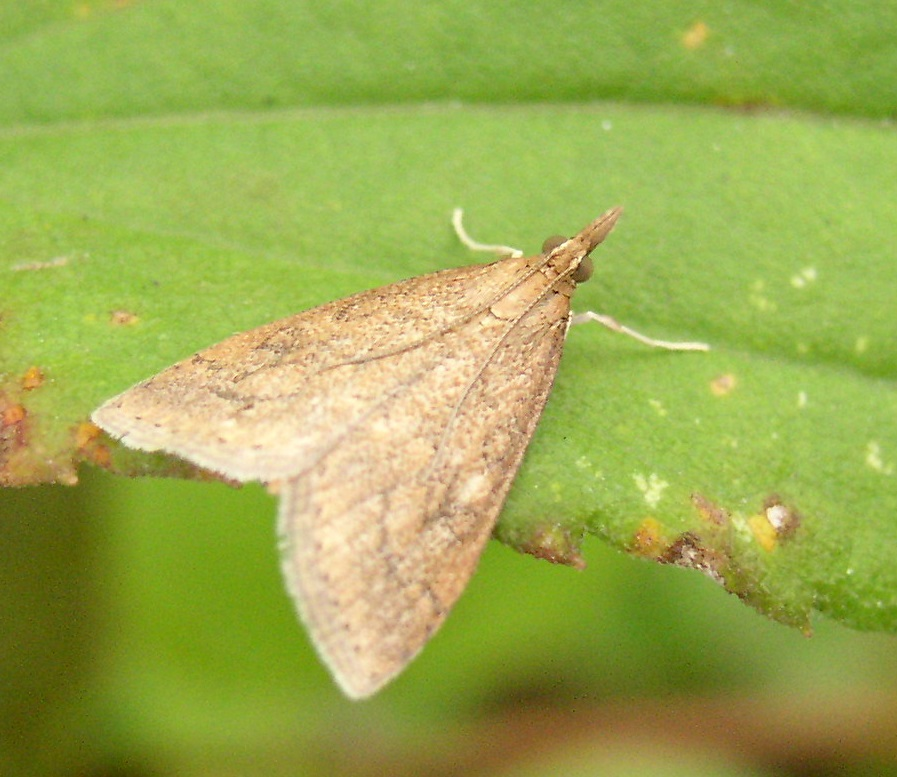

Scientific classification
- Kingdom: Animalia
- Phylum: Arthropoda
- Clade: Pancrustacea
- Class: Insecta
- Order: Lepidoptera
- Family: Crambidae
- Genus: Udea
- Species: U. rubigalis

Binomial name
- Udea rubigalis (Guenée, 1854)

Synonyms
- Scopula rubigalis Guenée, 1854; Botis harveyana Grote, 1877; Botys oblunalis Lederer, 1863; Oeobia rubigalis (Guenée, 1854); Phlyctaenia rubigalis (Guenée, 1854)

= Udea rubigalis =

Species of moth

Udea rubigalis, the celery leaftier or greenhouse leaftier, is a member of the family Crambidae. It is found across the Americas. The species was first described by Achille Guenée in 1854.

The larvae are polyphagous and feed on a wide variety of plants from different plant families. Preferred host plants are:

- Calendula officinalis (Asteraceae)
- Chrysanthemum × morifolium and Chrysanthemum frutescens (Asteraceae)
- Senecio cruentus (Asteraceae)
- Dianthus caryophyllus (Caryophyllaceae)
- Lathyrus odoratus (Fabaceae)
- Pelargonium hortorum (Geraniaceae)
- Antirrhinum species (Plantaginaceae)
- Rosa species (Rosaceae)
- Viola tricolor (Violaceae)

The larvae have also been recorded to be less injuriously feeding on:

- Justicia furcata (Acanthaceae)
- Ruellia amoena (Acanthaceae)
- Ageratum houstonianum (Asteraceae)
- Callistephus chinensis (Asteraceae)
- Cheiranthus sp. (Brassicaceae)
- Cnicus benedictus (Asteraceae)
- Dahlia rosea (Asteraceae)
- Matricaria parthenoides (Asteraceae)
- Senecio mikanioides (Asteraceae)
- Tagetes species (Asteraceae)
- Impatiens walleriana (Balsaminaceae)
- Begonia species (Begoniaceae)
- Heliotropium peruvianum (Boraginaceae)
- Lobelia erinus (Campanulaceae)
- Canna indica (Cannaceae)
- Tradescantia fluminensis (Commelinaceae)
- Ipomoea aculeata (Convolvulaceae)
- Azalea species (Ericaceae)
- Cytisus canariensis (Fabaceae)
- Swainsona galegifolia (Fabaceae)
- Kohleria inaequalis var. ocellata (Gesneriaceae)
- Deutzia gracilis (Hydrangeaceae)
- Coleus blumei (Lamiaceae)
- Nepeta hederacea (Lamiaceae)
- Salvia officinalis (Lamiaceae)
- Abutilon species (Malvaceae)
- Fuchsia speciosa (Onagraceae)
- Passiflora caerulea (Passifloraceae)
- Linaria cymbalaria (Plantaginaceae)
- Veronica species (Plantaginaceae)
- Plumbago capensis (Plumbaginaceae)
- Cyclamen persicum (Primulaceae)
- Primula species (Primulaceae)
- Anemone japonica (Ranunculaceae)
- Petunia hybrida (Solanaceae)
- Tropaeolum species (Tropaeolaceae)
- Lantana camara (Verbenaceae)
