= O. silvestrii =

O. silvestrii may refer to:

- Odontomachus silvestrii, W.M. Wheeler, 1927, a carnivorous ant species in the genus Odontomachus
- Oligomyrmex silvestrii, Santschi, 1914, an ant species in the genus Oligomyrmex

== See also ==
- Silvestrii (disambiguation)
