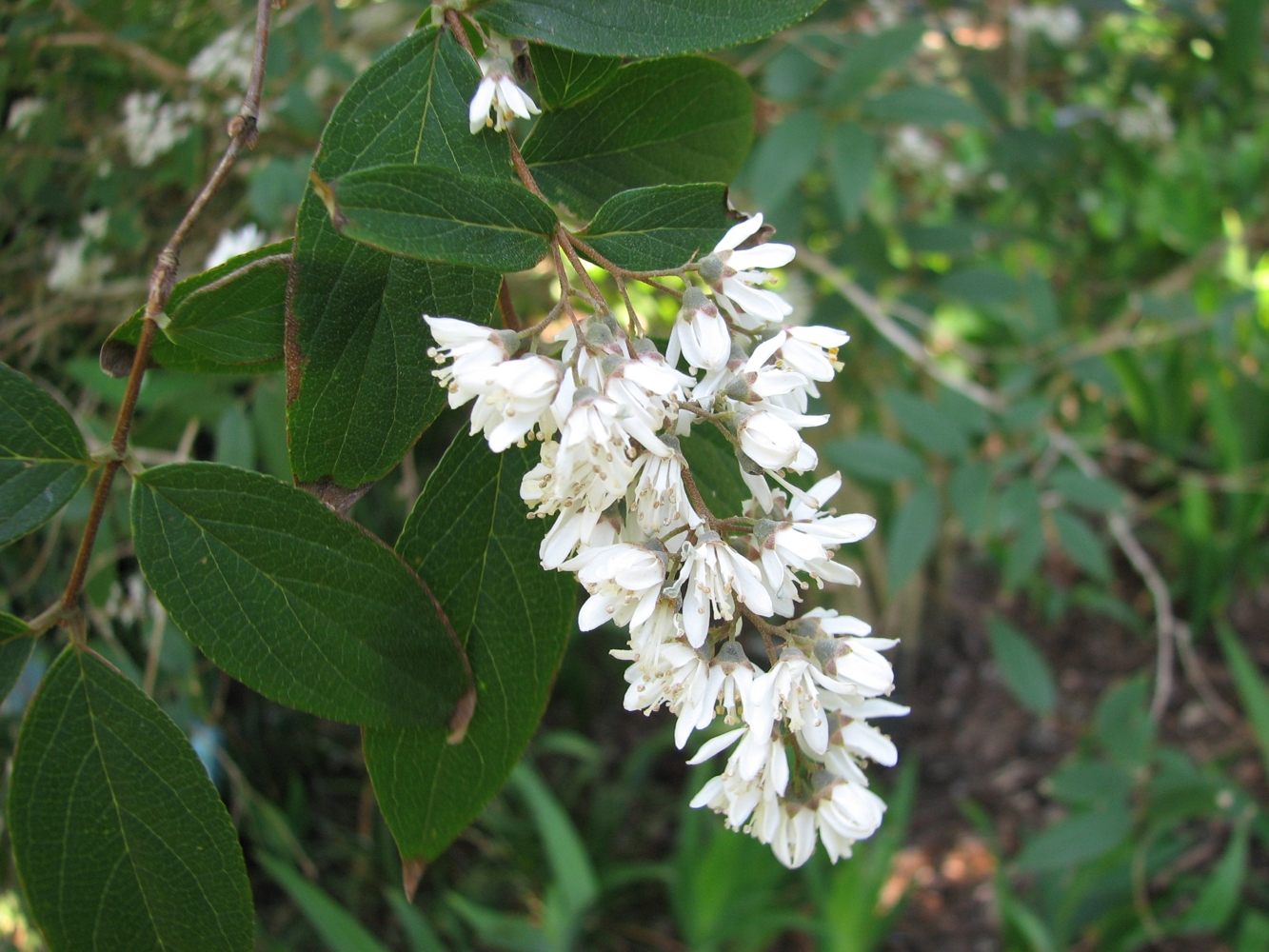

Scientific classification
- Kingdom: Plantae
- Clade: Tracheophytes
- Clade: Angiosperms
- Clade: Eudicots
- Clade: Asterids
- Order: Cornales
- Family: Hydrangeaceae
- Genus: Deutzia
- Species: D. ningpoensis

Binomial name
- Deutzia ningpoensis Rehder

= Deutzia ningpoensis =

Species of plant

Deutzia ningpoensis is a shrub in the family Hydrangeaceae. The species is endemic to China. It grows to between 1 and 2.5 metres high and produces panicles of white flowers from May to July in its native range.
