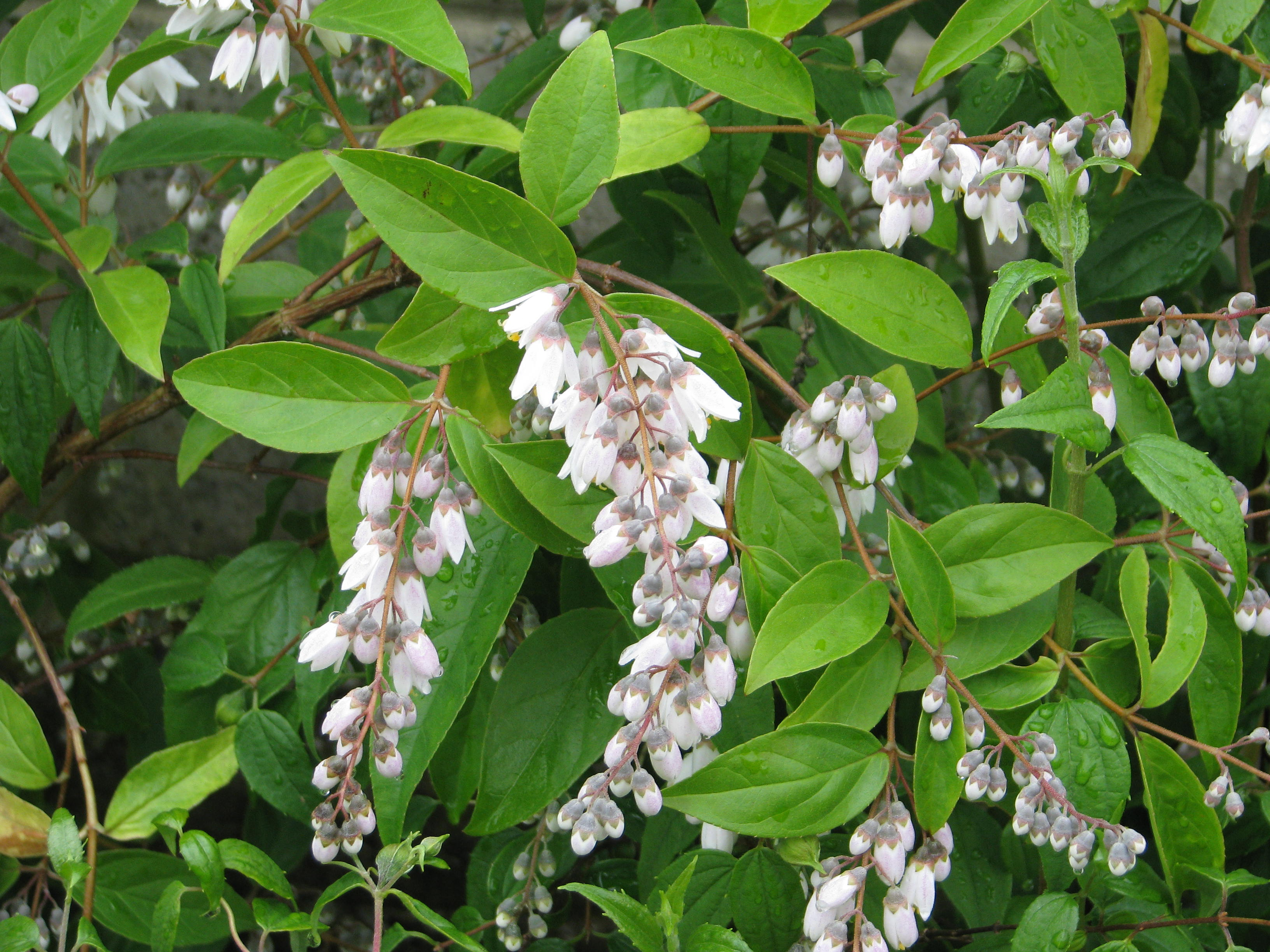
- Panicles of flowers
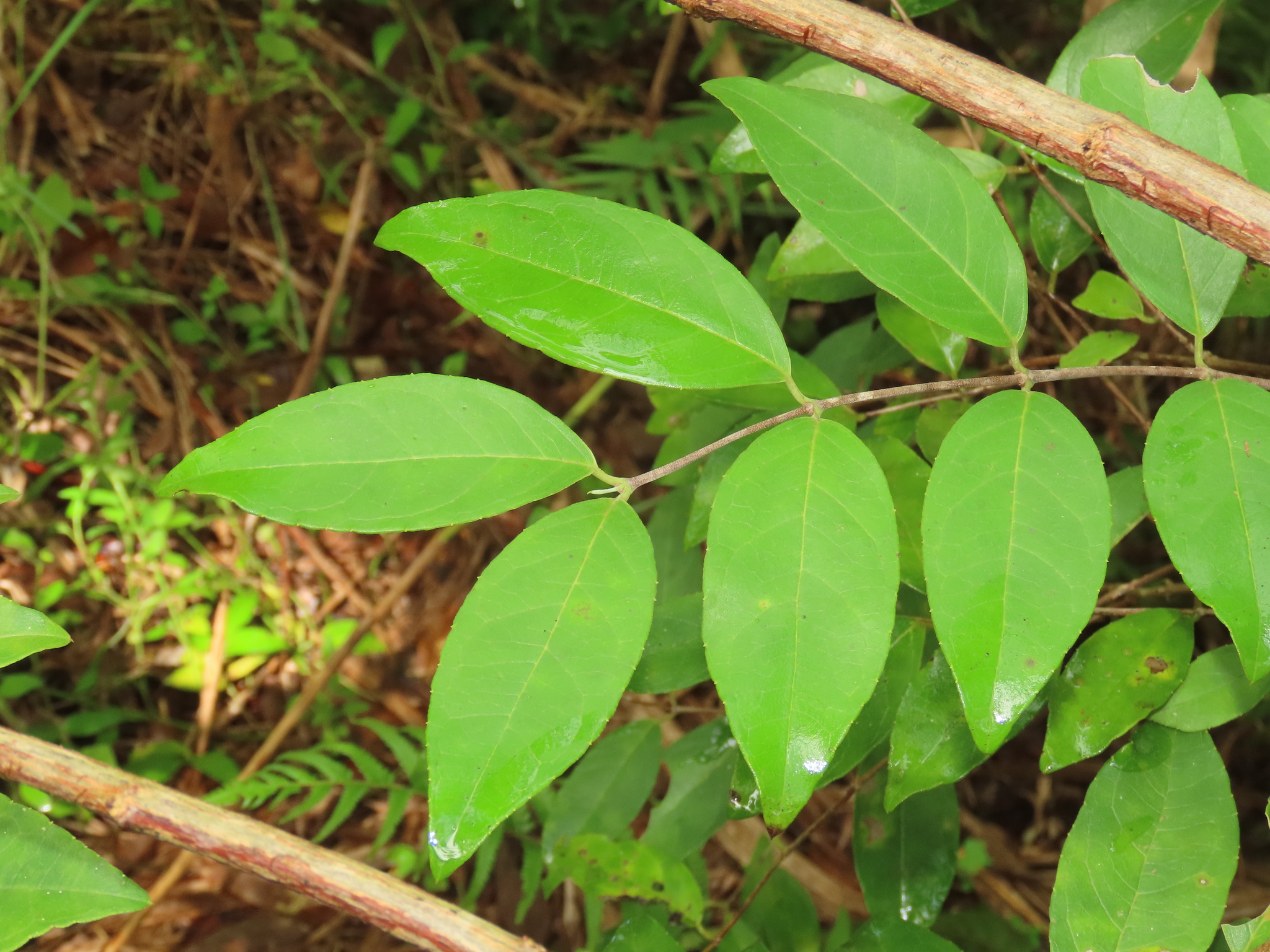
- Leaves and branches

Scientific classification
- Kingdom: Plantae
- Clade: Tracheophytes
- Clade: Angiosperms
- Clade: Eudicots
- Clade: Asterids
- Order: Cornales
- Family: Hydrangeaceae
- Genus: Deutzia
- Species: D. pulchra

Binomial name
- Deutzia pulchra S.Vidal

Synonyms
- List: Deutzia acuminata Merr.; Deutzia bartlettii Yamam.; Deutzia hayatae Nakai; Deutzia pulchra var. bartlettii (Yamam.) S.S.Ying; Deutzia pulchra var. formosana Nakai; Deutzia pulchra var. hayatae (Nakai) Zaik.; Deutzia pulchra var. typica Nakai; Deutzia taiwanensis Hayata

= Deutzia pulchra =

Species of plant

Deutzia pulchra, the beautiful deutzia, is a species of flowering plant in the family Hydrangeaceae. It is native to Taiwan and the Philippines. A deciduous shrub reaching 2.5 m (8 ft), it is readily available from commercial suppliers.
