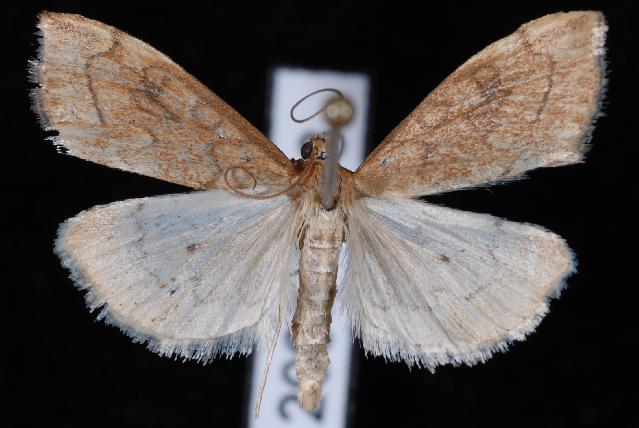

Scientific classification
- Kingdom: Animalia
- Phylum: Arthropoda
- Clade: Pancrustacea
- Class: Insecta
- Order: Lepidoptera
- Family: Crambidae
- Genus: Udea
- Species: U. profundalis

Binomial name
- Udea profundalis (Packard, 1873)

Synonyms
- Botis profundalis Packard, 1873

= Udea profundalis =

Species of moth

Udea profundalis is a moth in the family Crambidae. It was described by Packard in 1873. It is found in North America, where it has been recorded from British Columbia, through Washington, Oregon and Nevada to California and Texas. Records east of the Rocky Mountains, refer to Udea rubigalis.

The length of the forewings is 8.5–12 mm. Adults are deep ochreous-brown, the inner line on the forewings angulated outwards broadly on the median vein and inwards on the submedian. There is a large, round discal dot and a bell-shaped, reniform spot. The outer line is dark. The hindwings are primarily white
