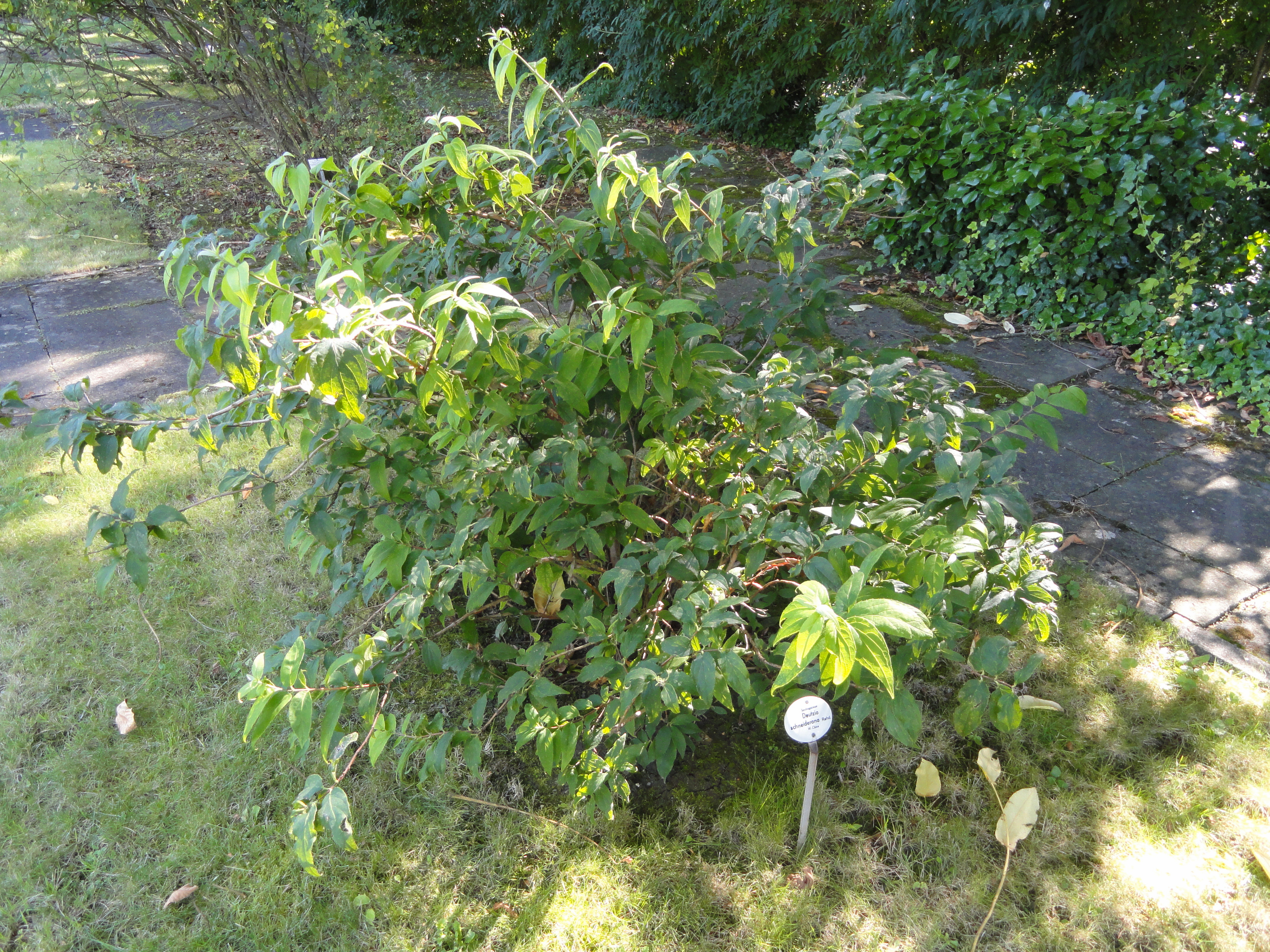

Scientific classification
- Kingdom: Plantae
- Clade: Tracheophytes
- Clade: Angiosperms
- Clade: Eudicots
- Clade: Asterids
- Order: Cornales
- Family: Hydrangeaceae
- Genus: Deutzia
- Species: D. schneideriana

Binomial name
- Deutzia schneideriana Rehder

= Deutzia schneideriana =

Species of plant

Deutzia schneideriana (长江溲疏) is a flowering shrub in the family Hydrangeaceae native to Anhui, Gansu, Hubei, Hunan, Jiangxi, and perhaps Zhejiang provinces in China. It grows 1–2 meters tall, with purplish red branchlets of 8–12 cm length.

== Synonyms ==
- Deutzia schneideriana var. laxiflora Rehder
