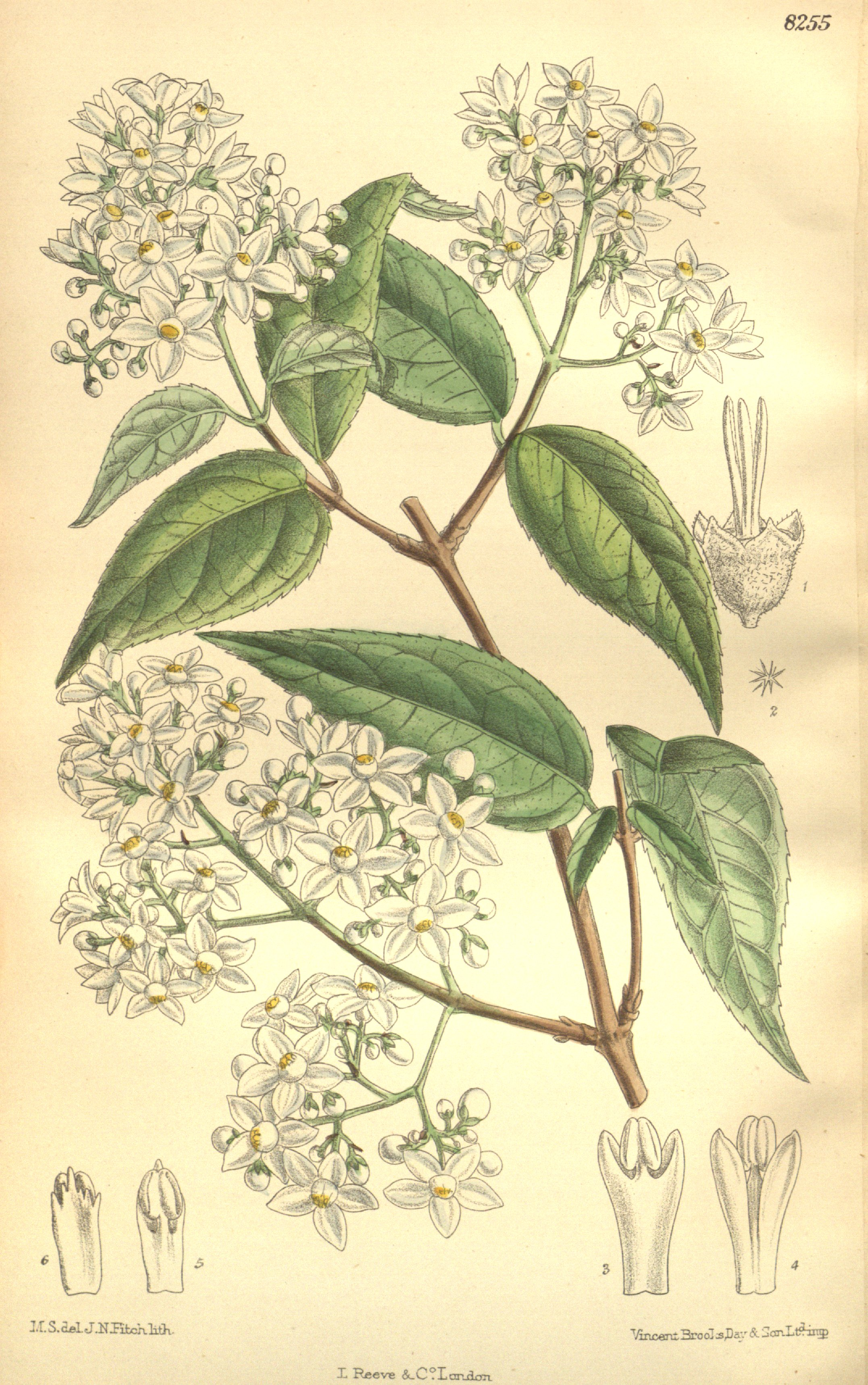
- Botanical illustration

Scientific classification
- Kingdom: Plantae
- Clade: Embryophytes
- Clade: Tracheophytes
- Clade: Spermatophytes
- Clade: Angiosperms
- Clade: Eudicots
- Clade: Asterids
- Order: Cornales
- Family: Hydrangeaceae
- Genus: Deutzia
- Species: D. setchuenensis

Binomial name
- Deutzia setchuenensis Franch.

Synonyms
- Deutzia bodinieri Rehder; Deutzia cyanocalyx H.Lév.; Deutzia leiboensis P.He & L.C.Hu

= Deutzia setchuenensis =

Species of flowering plant

Deutzia setchuenensis, the Sichuan deutzia, is a species of flowering plant in the family Hydrangeaceae, native to southeast and south-central China. The variety Deutzia setchuenensis var. corymbiflora, called the corymbose deutzia or Chinese snow flower, has gained the Royal Horticultural Society's Award of Garden Merit. Growing to 2.5 m (8.2 ft) tall by 1.5 m (4.9 ft) broad, it is a deciduous shrub with flat panicles of small white flowers in early summer. It prefers full or partial sunlight, in moist fertile soil.
