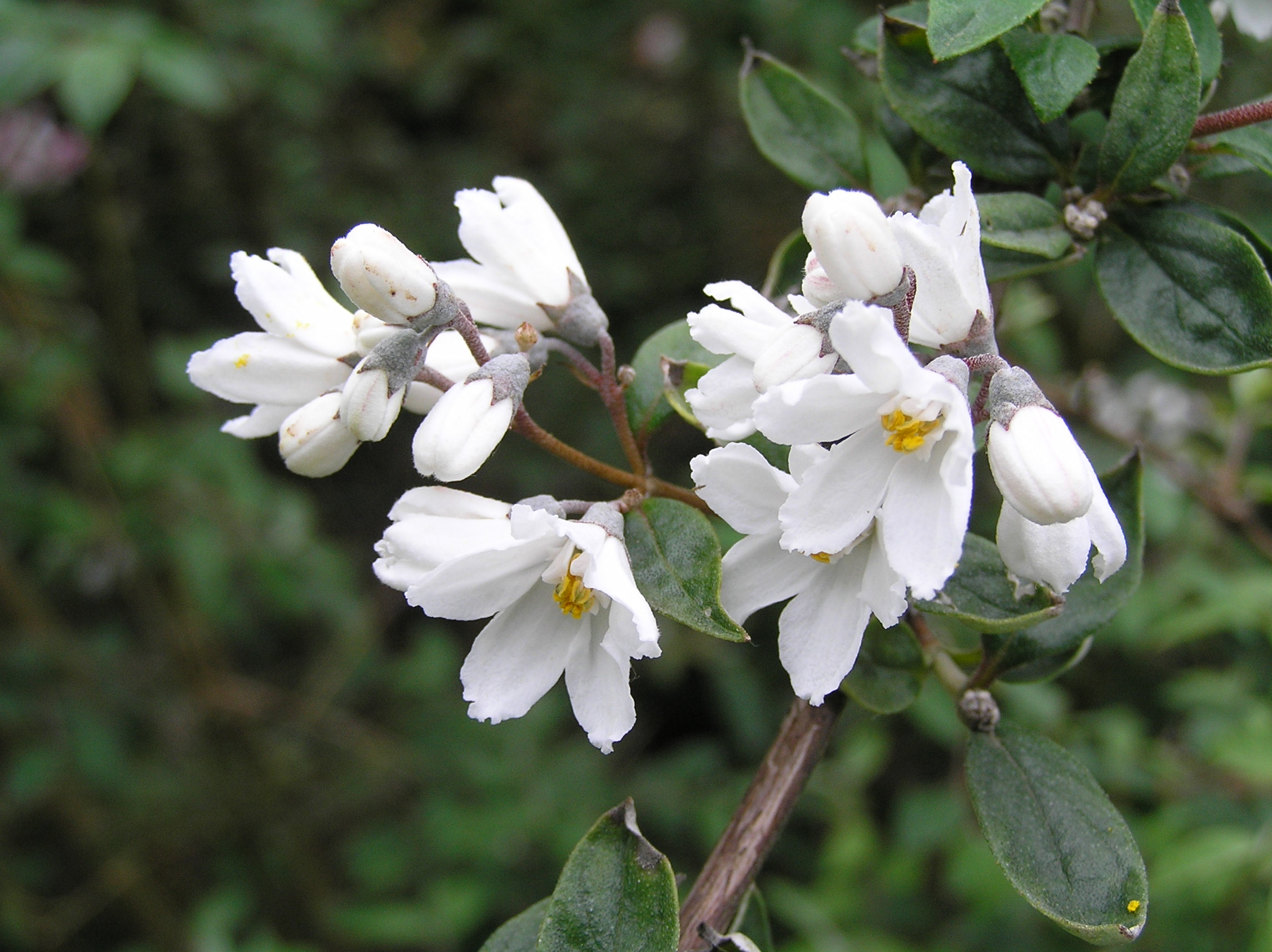

Scientific classification
- Kingdom: Plantae
- Clade: Tracheophytes
- Clade: Angiosperms
- Clade: Eudicots
- Clade: Asterids
- Order: Cornales
- Family: Hydrangeaceae
- Genus: Deutzia
- Species: D. monbeigii

Binomial name
- Deutzia monbeigii W.W.Sm.

= Deutzia monbeigii =

Species of plant

Deutzia monbeigii, the Monbeig's deutzia (Chinese: 维西溲疏), is a species of flowering plant in the family Hydrangeaceae that is native to Southwest China.

This plant, originally from the northwest of Yunnan, China, was introduced by George Forrest in 1920. He initially collected it in November 1917, and then again in July 1921.

Growing to 1.2 m (3.9 ft), it has ovate, pointed, toothed leaves, and bright pink or white, star-shaped flowers in early to midsummer. In cultivation in the UK it has gained the Royal Horticultural Society's Award of Garden Merit. It should be grown in moist but well-drained soil under full sunlight or partial shade. It can be propagated using softwood cuttings during summer.
