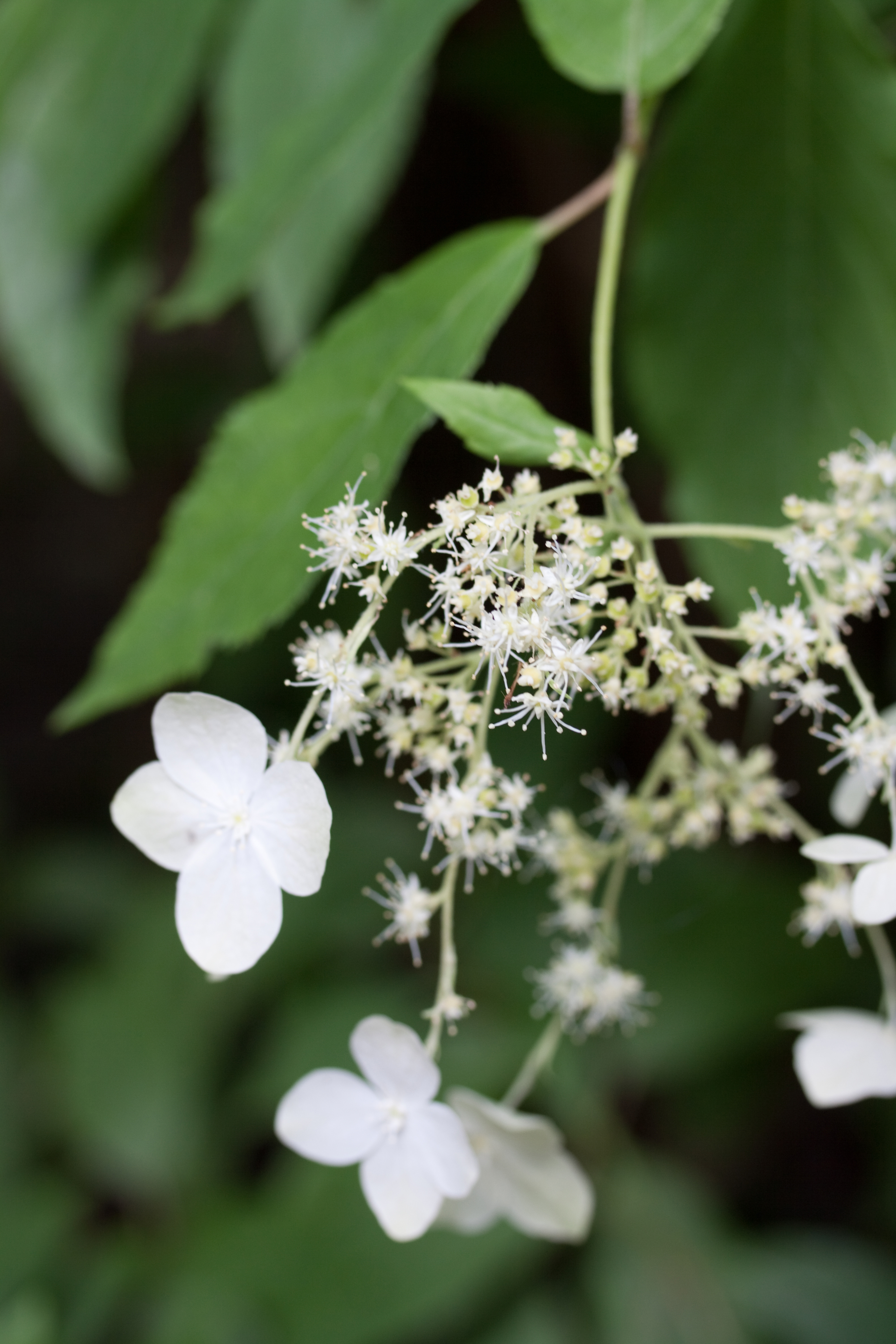

Scientific classification
- Kingdom: Plantae
- Clade: Tracheophytes
- Clade: Angiosperms
- Clade: Eudicots
- Clade: Asterids
- Order: Cornales
- Family: Hydrangeaceae
- Genus: Hydrangea
- Species: H. heteromalla

Binomial name
- Hydrangea heteromalla D.Don

Synonyms
- Heteromalla doniana H.Ohba & S.Akiyama; Heteromalla vestita (Wall.) H.Ohba & S.Akiyama; Hydrangea bretschneideri var. lancifoliaRehder; Hydrangea dumicola W.W.Sm.; Hydrangea heteromalla var. parviflora Marquand & Airy Shaw; Hydrangea khasiana Hook.f. & Thomson; Hydrangea mandarinorum Diels; Hydrangea sungpanensis Hand.-Mazz.; Hydrangea vestita Wall.

= Hydrangea heteromalla =

Species of flowering plant

Hydrangea heteromalla is a species of flowering plant in the family Hydrangeaceae. It is commonly known as woolly hydrangea, Himalayan hydrangea or Chinese hydrangea and is native to the Himalayas and China. Average height is 10–15 ft (3.0–4.6 m) with inflorescences that are 5–8 in (13–20 cm) across and bloom May–June, full flowering only occurs in full sun. Leaves are elliptical or ovate and margins are slightly serrated. Is a very adaptable plant that is hardy to USDA zones (4)5–7. This plant is seldom seen in American gardens. There is a nice specimen at the Sir Harold Hillier Gardens. Hydrangea heteromalla is a deciduous shrub or small tree. Its native habitats include alpine forests and thickets in the Himalayas and China.
