= Deutzia taiwanensis =

Scientific classification
- Kingdom: Plantae
- Clade: Tracheophytes
- Clade: Angiosperms
- Clade: Eudicots
- Clade: Asterids
- Order: Cornales
- Family: Hydrangeaceae
- Genus: Deutzia
- Species: D. taiwanensis

Binomial name
- Deutzia taiwanensis (Maxim.) C.K.Schneid.

Synonyms
- Deutzia cordatula H.L.Li; Deutzia crenata var. taiwanensis Maxim.; Deutzia gracilis subsp. arisanensis Zakirov; Deutzia kelungensis Hayata

Species of plant

Deutzia taiwanensis is a species of flowering plant in the family Hydrangeaceae. It is endemic to northern Taiwan. A shrub typically 3 to 5 m (10 to 16 ft) tall, it is found in mountainous areas in thickets or mixed forests, at elevations from 300 to 2,500 m (1,000 to 8,000 ft) above sea level.
