= Egisto Perino =

Italian Air Force general

- Born: 8 September 1896; Massa, Kingdom of Italy
- Died: 12 September 1942 (aged 46); Rome, Kingdom of Italy
- Military career
- Allegiance: Kingdom of Italy
- Branch: Royal Italian Army; Regia Aeronautica
- Rank: Air Fleet General
- Conflicts: World War I; World War II; North African campaign
- Awards: Bronze Medal of Military Valor; Order of the Crown of Italy; Order of Saints Maurice and Lazarus; Order of the German Eagle

Egisto Perino (Massa, 8 September 1896 – Rome, 12 September 1942) was an Italian Air Force general during World War II.

== Biography ==
He was born in Massa on September 8, 1896, the son of Salvatore Perino and Adele Servaroli. He participated in the First World War as an infantry officer of the Royal Italian Army, and continued his military career after the war, joining the newly established Regia Aeronautica in 1925. In 1926 he became a military pilot. On June 28, 1928 he participated in a mass flight carried out by six Ansaldo A.120 and six Fiat R.22 which under the leadership of General Italo Balbo went to the annual event that was held at the Hendon Aerodrome; after witnessing the annual military exercises held on that base, which simulated city bombing, dogfighting and colonial police operations, on the 30th of the same month the planes returned to Italy. The pilots employed for this mission had been selected among the best available in Italy. Between 1933 and 1935 he was Chief Instructor at the School of Air Warfare, at the disposal of the Ministry of War. On May 31, 1934 he was awarded the title of Knight of the Order of Saints Maurice and Lazarus. After commanding a bomber wing, he was promoted to the rank of colonel, becoming Deputy Commander of the Air Warfare School. In March 1939 he was promoted to the rank of air brigade general (equivalent to air commodore).

Following the entry of the Kingdom of Italy into the Second World War, which took place on 10 June 1940, he was assigned to the General Staff of the Regia Aeronautica. Shortly before the capitulation of France, on June 18, he was part of the Italian delegation (along with Minister of Foreign Affairs Galeazzo Ciano, Foreign Ministry official Gino Buti, Deputy Army Chief of Staff General Mario Roatta, and Rear Admiral Raffaele de Courten) that went to Munich to speak with Adolf Hitler to present the armistice requests that the Italian government intended to make to the French one. Hitler was not opposed to the Italian requests, but expounded his own, which on the return of the delegation to Rome led Mussolini to ask Hitler to moderate them, so as not to exasperate the French. During the visit, Perino was decorated with the Order of the German Eagle directly from the hands of the Führer. Shortly thereafter, he was sent on an inspection to North Africa, in order to assess the state of the Italian air forces operating in that theatre. On June 28 he witnessed the death of Marshal of the Air Force Italo Balbo, shot down over Tobruk in a friendly fire incident; Perino was travelling on the SM. 79 that was accompanying Balbo's plane.

Immediately after Balbo's death, Perino was tasked by the Chief of Staff of the Regia Aeronautica, General Francesco Pricolo, with preparing an extensive and detailed report on the incident. This report was submitted to the Air Force Staff in Rome on 1 July 1940, but it remained secret, on the order of Mussolini himself. In July 1940 Perino became Chief of Staff of the newly established 5th Air Fleet, briefly taking over its command from General Felice Porro while awaiting the arrival of General Mario Ajmone Cat. Upon arrival of the latter, Perino was replaced in his role by General Fernando Silvestri; for his activities in North Africa he was awarded a Bronze Medal of Military Valor. In January 1941 he was promoted to the rank of Air Division General (air vice marshal), and became Deputy Commander of the 3rd Air Fleet. He died in Rome on 12 September 1942, due to a serious illness contracted in service.
