= Deutzia silvestrii =

Scientific classification
- Kingdom: Plantae
- Clade: Tracheophytes
- Clade: Angiosperms
- Clade: Eudicots
- Clade: Asterids
- Order: Cornales
- Family: Hydrangeaceae
- Genus: Deutzia
- Species: D. silvestrii

Binomial name
- Deutzia silvestrii Pamp.

Species of plant

Deutzia silvestrii is a species of Safflower in the family Hydrangeaceae. It is found in central China (红花溲疏; hóng huā sōu shū).
