= Fernando Silvestri =

Italian Air Force general

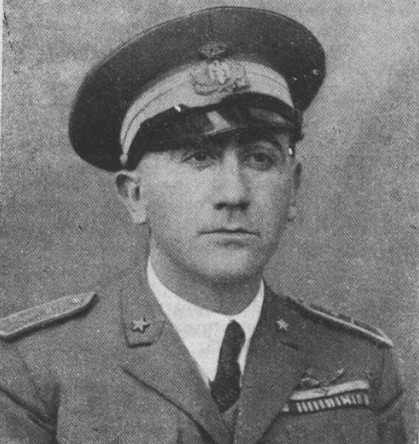
- Born: 1 October 1896; Rome, Kingdom of Italy
- Died: 27 February 1959 (aged 62); Rome, Italy
- Military career
- Allegiance: Kingdom of Italy; Italy
- Branch: Royal Italian Army; Regia Aeronautica; Italian Air Force
- Rank: Air Fleet General
- Commands: 20th Reconnaissance Wing; 3rd Territorial Air Zone; Cerveteri Aerial Observation School; Libya Air Force East Sector Command; Commander-General of the Territorial Air Defense
- Conflicts: World War I; Italian Front; Senussi campaign; World War II; North African campaign
- Awards: Silver Medal of Military Valor; Military Order of Savoy; War Merit Cross (twice); Order of Saints Maurice and Lazarus; Order of the Crown of Italy; Order of Merit of the Italian Republic; Order of the German Eagle; Iron Cross Second Class

Fernando Silvestri (Rome, 1 October 1896 – 27 February 1959) was an Italian Air Force general during World War II.

== Biography ==
He was born in Rome on 1 October 1896, and in January 1915 he volunteered to join the Royal Italian Army, assigned to the 13th Field Artillery Regiment as an officer cadet. He was promoted to second lieutenant in the following June, shortly after Italy's entry into the First World War, and was assigned to the 23rd Field Artillery Regiment. On the same year, after attending the heavy artillery course at the Application School of Turin, he was sent to the front with the 1st Heavy Field Artillery Regiment until November 1916, when he became navigator cadet in the 45th Airplane Squadron, flying aboard Farman 14 and Savoia-Pomilio SP.2 aircraft. After obtaining an aircraft navigator's license and a promotion to lieutenant he participated in numerous reconnaissance flights, until in July 1917 his aircraft was shot down in an air battle near Solkan and he was wounded. For his behaviour during this action he was awarded the Silver Medal of Military Valor. After recovering he returned to service at the Aviation Depot in Turin, but a few days later he was sent to Tripolitania, where he arrived on 28 October 1917, to serve at the 12th Caproni Squadron based in Tripoli; he was awarded two War Merit Crosses for his role during the Senussi campaign.

In April 1922 he was formally transferred to the Army Air Service, assigned to the 3rd Airplane Group, and in October 1923 he was transferred to the newly established Regia Aeronautica with the rank of lieutenant. In May 1924 he assumed command of the 20th Reconnaissance Wing, and in April 1925 he was promoted to squadron commander (rank transformed into that of captain after the internal reorganization of the Regia Aeronautica). In December of the same year he was awarded the Knight's Cross of the Order of the Crown of Italy, and in the same month he married Miss Carolina Pezzi, sister of his comrades and friends Mario Pezzi and Enrico Pezzi. In June 1926 he obtained the pilot license for Ansaldo A.300 aircraft, and in the following October he assumed command of the 3rd Territorial Air Zone (ZAT), which he maintained until February 1928. On that date was assigned to the General Staff Office of the Regia Aeronautica, but in May 1930 he resumed command of the 20th Wing with the rank of major, being promoted to lieutenant colonel in March 1932.

In May 1934 he assumed command of the Cerveteri Aerial Observation School, while also holding the position of flight instructor and teacher of Air Military Art. In February 1936 he was promoted to colonel, taking over the East Sector Command of the Air Force of Libya in August. In 1939 he was promoted to air brigadier general (air commodore). He participated in the early military operations following Italy's entry into World War II, on 10 June 1940; following the reorganization of the Italian forces, the Air Force of Libya was renamed 5th Air Fleet on 15 July 1940. In February 1941 he became Chief of Staff of the 5th Air Fleet (replacing General Egisto Perino), a post he kept until February 1942 when, after promoted to Air Division General (air vice marshal), he returned to Italy and was assigned to the General Staff of the Regia Aeronautica. During his period there he was among the promoters of "Operation S", a planned demonstrative bombing raid on New York which would be carried out by a single bomber (initially the Piaggio P.23R, later replaced by a CANT Z.511 and then by a Savoia-Marchetti SM.95), which however was never carried out due to the worsening of the Italian war situation.

In 1946 he was promoted to Air Fleet General (air marshal), and in July 1948 became Inspector of the Air Force and Commander-General of the Territorial Air Defense. In February 1951 he was appointed Secretary-General of the Air Force, a post he held until 30 April 1955, when he was discharged for having reached the age limit. He was then appointed President of the Technical Commission for the construction of the new Fiumicino airport, but he committed suicide on 29 November 1959. His father had committed suicide at the same age.
