= Silvestris =

Silvestris may refer to:

- Bernardus Silvestris, a medieval Platonist philosopher and poet of the 12th century
- Silvestris, a Latin word commonly used in systematic names
