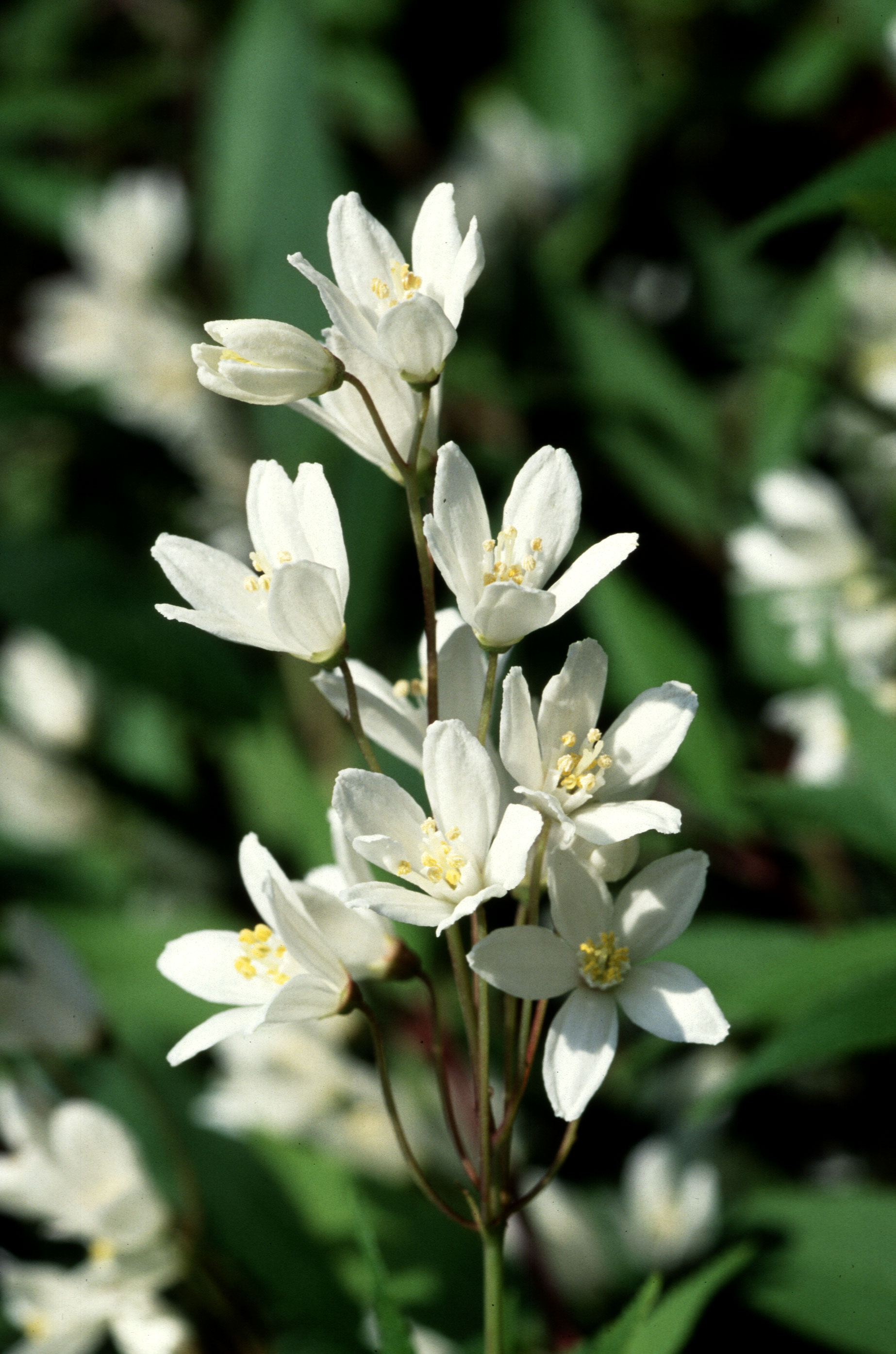
- Deutzia gracilis

Scientific classification
- Kingdom: Plantae
- Clade: Tracheophytes
- Clade: Angiosperms
- Clade: Eudicots
- Clade: Asterids
- Order: Cornales
- Family: Hydrangeaceae
- Subfamily: Hydrangeoideae
- Tribe: Philadelpheae
- Genus: Deutzia; Thunb.

Type species
- Deutzia scabra Thunb.

Species
- See text

= Deutzia =

Genus of flowering plants

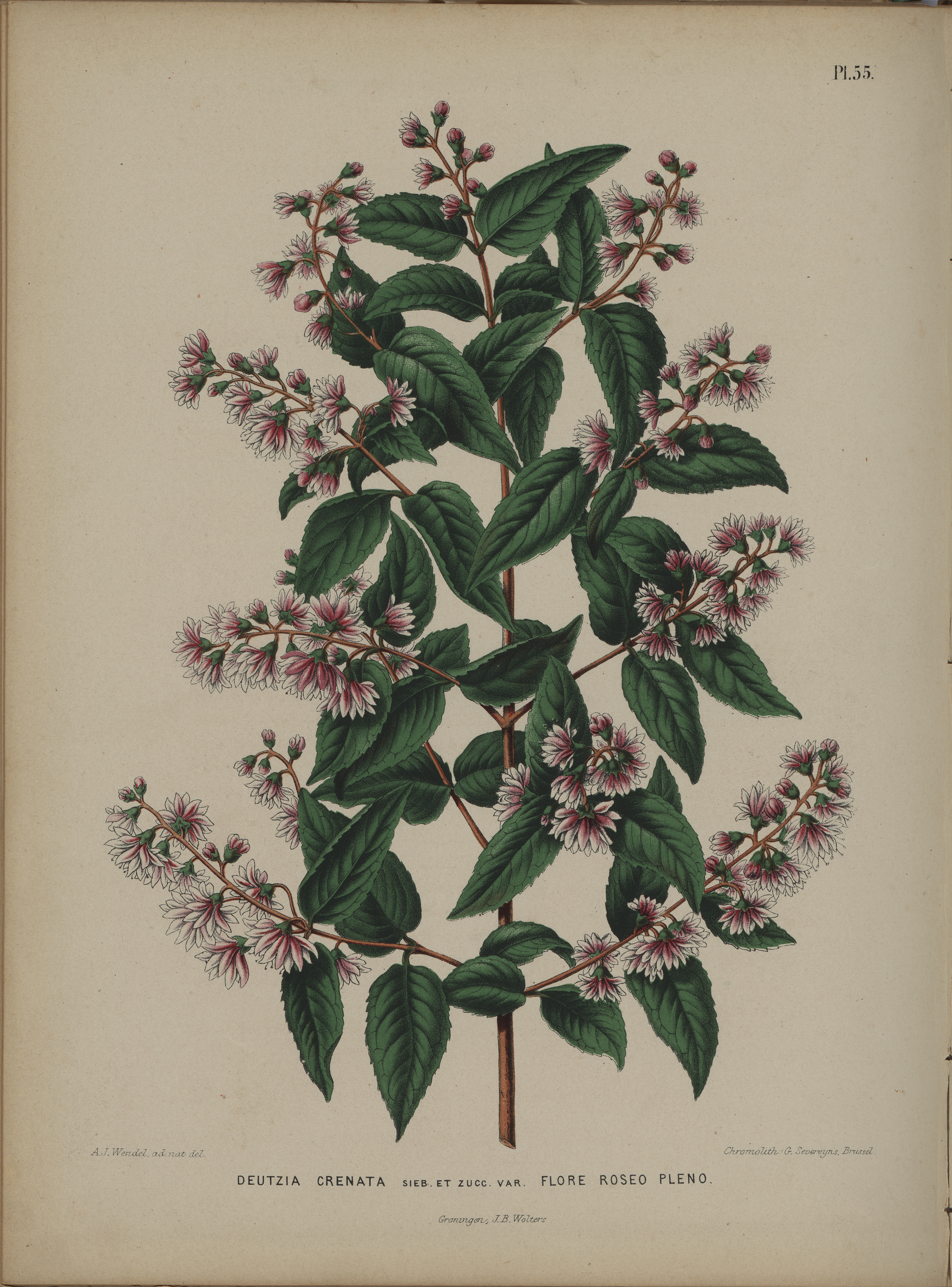
Deutzia crenata by Abraham Jacobus Wendel, 1868

Deutzia (/ˈdjuːtsiə/ or /ˈdɔɪtsiə/) is a genus of about 60 species of flowering plants in the family Hydrangeaceae, native to eastern and central Asia (from the Himalayas east to Japan and the Philippines), and Central America and also Europe. By far the highest species diversity is in China, where 50 species occur.

== Description ==
The species are shrubs ranging from 1–4 m (3 ft 3 in – 13 ft 1 in) in height. Most are deciduous, but a few subtropical species are evergreen. The leaves are opposite, simple, with a serrated margin. The flowers are produced in panicles or corymbs; they are white in most species, sometimes pink or reddish. The fruit is a dry capsule containing numerous small seeds. Identification of the species is very difficult, requiring often microscopic detail of the leaf hairs and seed capsule structure.

== Etymology ==
Deutzia was named by Carl Peter Thunberg for his friend and patron, Johann van der Deutz, 18th century botanist.

== Taxonomy ==
=== Selected species ===
- Deutzia albida
- Deutzia aspera
- Deutzia baroniana
- Deutzia bhutanensis
- Deutzia bomiensis
- Deutzia breviloba
- Deutzia calycosa
- Deutzia cinerascens
- Deutzia compacta
- Deutzia coreana
- Deutzia coriacea
- Deutzia corymbosa
- Deutzia crassidentata
- Deutzia crassifolia
- Deutzia crenata - Crenate deutzia
- Deutzia cymuligera
- Deutzia discolor
- Deutzia esquirolii
- Deutzia faberi
- Deutzia glabrata
- Deutzia glauca
- Deutzia glaucophylla
- Deutzia globosa
- Deutzia glomeruliflora
- Deutzia gracilis - Slender deutzia
- Deutzia grandiflora
- Deutzia heterophylla
- Deutzia hookeriana
- Deutzia hypoglauca
- Deutzia longifolia
- Deutzia maximowicziana
- Deutzia mollis
- Deutzia monbeigii
- Deutzia muliensis
- Deutzia multiradiata
- Deutzia nanchuanensis
- Deutzia ningpoensis
- Deutzia obtusilobata
- Deutzia paniculata – Paniculate Korean deutzia
- Deutzia parviflora - Mongolian deutzia
- Deutzia pilosa
- Deutzia pulchra
- Deutzia purpurascens
- Deutzia reflexa
- Deutzia rehderiana
- Deutzia rubens
- Deutzia scabra - Fuzzy deutzia
- Deutzia schneideriana
- Deutzia setchuenensis
- Deutzia silvestrii
- Deutzia squamosa
- Deutzia staminea
- Deutzia subulata
- Deutzia taibaiensis
- Deutzia taiwanensis
- Deutzia uniflora – Korean deutzia
- Deutzia wardiana
- Deutzia yunnanensis
- Deutzia zhongdianensis

== Cultivation and uses ==
The deutzias are fairly new to gardens: the exception, D. scabra, was noticed in Japanese gardens by Engelbert Kaempfer (1712) and Carl Peter Thunberg (1784) but not actually seen in Europe till the 1830s; two-thirds of the species noted in the R.H.S. Dictionary were gathered in from the wild during the 20th century.

Deutzias are commonly grown as ornamental plants for their white and pink flowers. Many cultivars and hybrids have been selected for garden use, including selections with double flowers. For example, Deutzia × lemoinei is a hybrid of D. gracilis and D. parviflora. The following cultivars and hybrids have gained the Royal Horticultural Society's Award of Garden Merit:-

- Deutzia gracilis 'Nikko'
- Deutzia monbeigii
- Deutzia scabra 'Candidissima'
- Deutzia scabra 'Codsall Pink'
- Deutzia setchuenensis var. corymbiflora
- Deutzia × elegantissima 'Rosealind'
- Deutzia × hybrida 'Contraste'
- Deutzia × hybrida 'Mont Rose'
- Deutzia × hybrida 'Strawberry Fields'

The temperate deutzias are mostly hardy shrubs from East Asia where winters are dependably frozen; in milder climates, like much of England, the early-flowering species and hybrids are coaxed into premature bloom by mild spells, then spoilt by frost. Alice Coats remarks that deutzias have done better in Edinburgh, on the chilly east coast of Scotland, than in London. A solution in milder climates might be to site deutzia in the garden's most exposed, coldest microclimate, as is often done with early-flowering magnolias.

Identification can be difficult, and in particular, many of the plants in cultivation sold as D. scabra are actually D. crenata (Huxley 1992). The selected hybrid white double "Pride-of-Rochester", already in cultivation in 1881, was originated by the Rochester, New York nurserymen Ellwanger and Barry.

Deutzia scabra is used by joiners in Japan to polish wood.

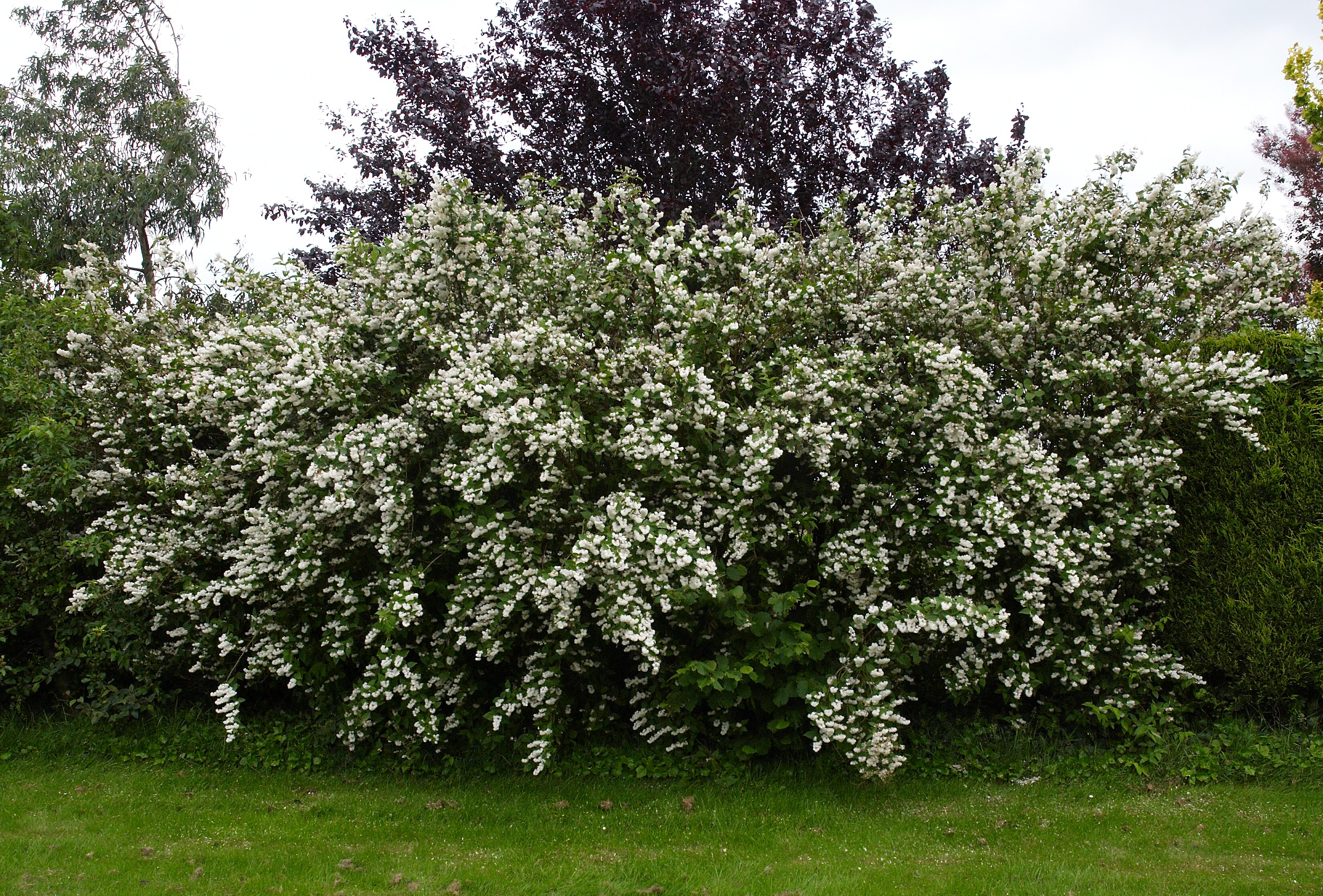
Deutzia scabra

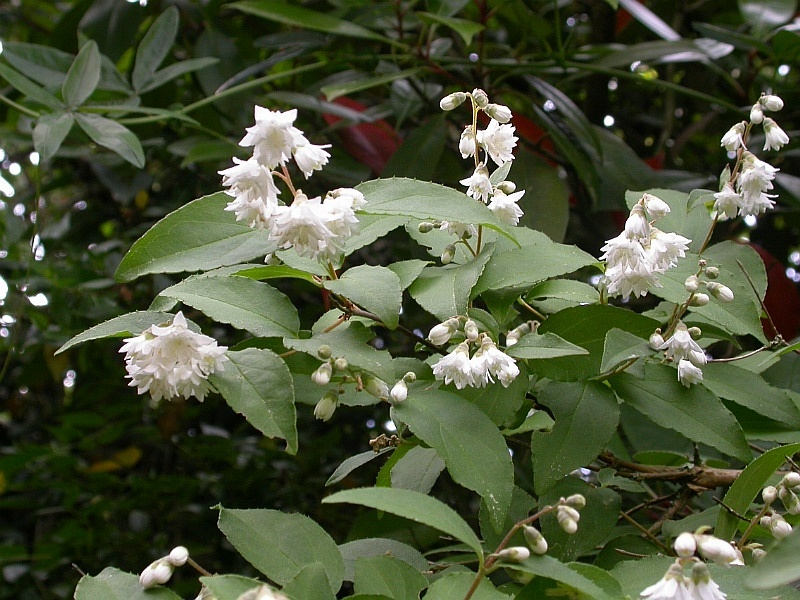
Deutzia crenata 'Plena', a double-flowered cultivar

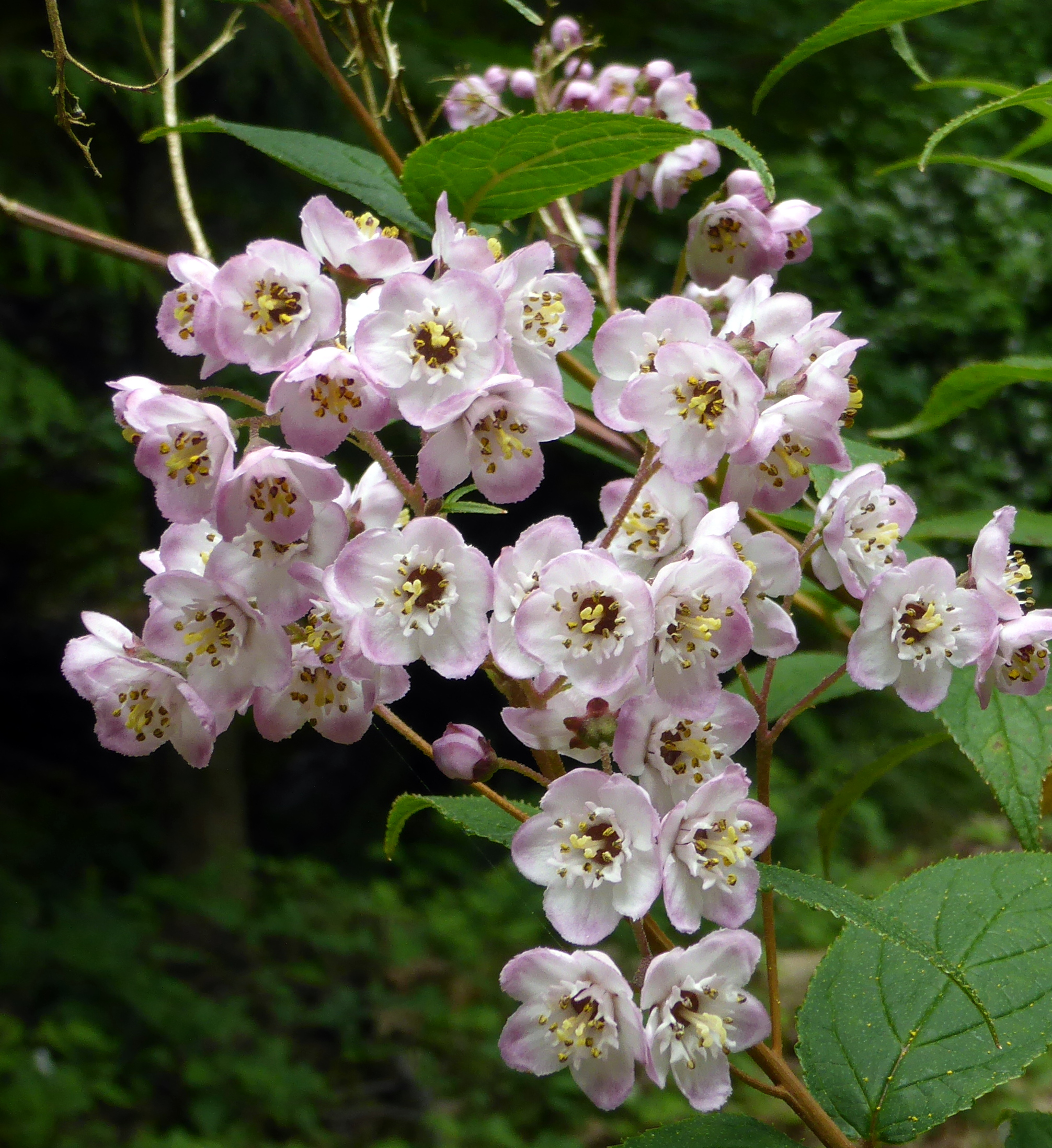
Deutzia hookeriana at UBC Botanical Garden
