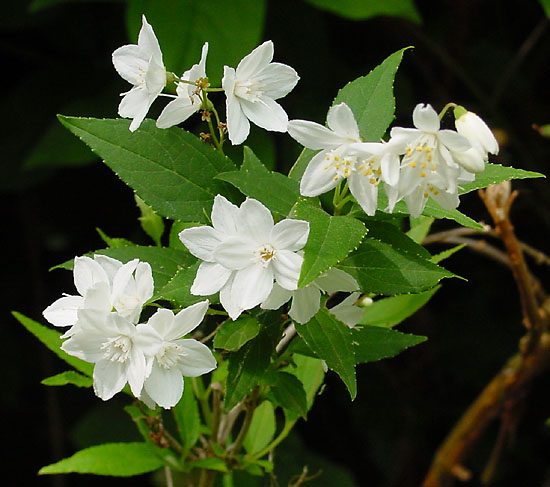

Conservation status
- Least Concern (IUCN 3.1)

Scientific classification
- Kingdom: Plantae
- Clade: Tracheophytes
- Clade: Angiosperms
- Clade: Eudicots
- Clade: Asterids
- Order: Cornales
- Family: Hydrangeaceae
- Genus: Deutzia
- Species: D. gracilis

Binomial name
- Deutzia gracilis Siebold & Zucc.

= Deutzia gracilis =

Plant in the hydrangea family

Deutzia gracilis, the slender deutzia or Japanese snow flower, is a species of flowering plant in the hydrangea family Hydrangeaceae, native to Japan.

== Description ==
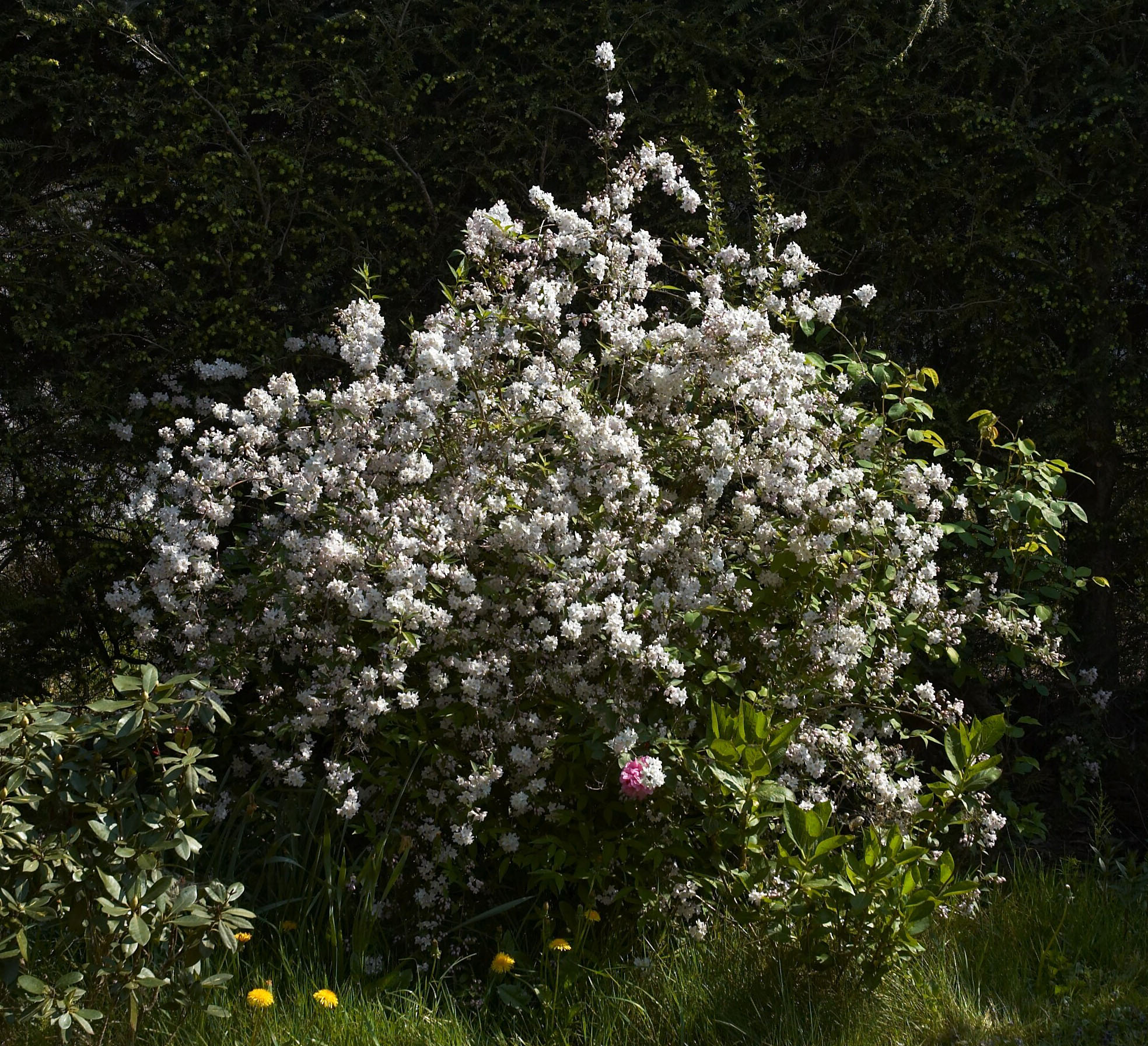

It is a deciduous shrub with opposite, simple leaves, and slender, arching stems. It is a broad, upright, bushy and finely branched shrub up to 1.5 meters high. Twigs that carry flowers are brown, 5 to 17 centimeters long, glabrous and usually four-leaved. The leaves have a 2 to 4 millimeter long stem. The leaf blade is light green, simple, lanceolate, oval-lanceolate or broadly ovate-lanceolate, 3 to 4.5 inches long and 1 to 1.2 inches wide, pointed long, with a wedge-shaped base and finely serrated edge.

Three or four pairs of nerves are formed. The upper side of the leaf is covered with three or four-pointed star hairs, the underside with four or five, rarely six-pointed star hairs.

=== Inflorescences ===
The flowers are white, borne in spring and summer.

The inflorescences are 8 to 12 centimeters long, upright racemes or narrow panicles of 12 to 25 flowers with a bare inflorescence spindle. The flower stalk is thin and 5 to 10 millimeters long. The flower cup is 2.5 to 3 millimeters long with a diameter of about 2.5 millimeters. The calyx lobes are 1.5 centimeters long, ovate to ovate-triangular, glabrous or loosely hairy. The petals overlap like roof tiles, they are white, 10 to 12 millimeters long and 4 to 6 millimeters wide, oblong to oblong-lanceolate. The outer stamens are 5 to 6 millimeters long with bidentate or awl and imperforate stamens and stalked, egg-shaped anthers. All inner stamens are bidentate. The three styles are the same length or slightly longer than the outer stamens.

The capsule fruits are hemispherical and about 5 millimeters in diameter.

== Occurrence ==
The natural range is on the Japanese islands of Honshū, Kyushu and Shikoku and on Taiwan. It grows in moist woods and cool to Bush surfaces permeable to moist fresh, acidic to neutral, sandy and gravelly or-humic soil on sunny to light shade. The species is mostly frost hardy, but avoids chalky soils.

== Cultivation ==
The compact cultivar 'Nikko', growing to 1 m (3.3 ft) tall by 1.5 m (4.9 ft) broad, has gained the Royal Horticultural Society's Award of Garden Merit.

The hybrid Deutzia × rosea (syn. Deutzia gracilis 'Rosea') has pink flowers, as its name suggests.
