= Marco Silvestri (footballer, born 1999) =

Italian footballer

Personal information
- Date of birth: 30 April 1999 (age 27)
- Place of birth: Genoa, Italy
- Position: Midfielder

Team information
- Current team: Ligorna
- Number: 29

Youth career
- –2018: Genoa

Senior career*
Years	Team	Apps	(Gls)
2018–2019	Ligorna	30	(4)
2019–2021	Avellino	33	(0)
2021–	Ligorna	10	(1)
- * Club domestic league appearances and goals as of 21 November 2021

Marco Silvestri (born 30 April 1999) is an Italian professional footballer who plays as a midfielder for Serie D club Ligorna.

== Club career ==
Formed on Genoa youth system, Silvestri played for Serie D club SC Ligorna 1922 on 2018–19 season.

On 5 August 2019, he joined to Serie C club U.S. Avellino 1912. Us Avellino announces that it has reached a two-year agreement with Silvestri in August 2020.

On 30 September 2021, he returned to Ligorna.

== Career statistics ==
=== Club ===
As of match played 9 June 2021

Appearances and goals by club, season and competition
Club	Season	League			National Cup		Other		Total	
Club	Season	Division	Apps	Goals	Apps	Goals	Apps	Goals	Apps	Goals
Ligorna	2018–19	Serie D	30	4	—		2 (Note: Appearance(s) in Playoffs Serie D)	1	32	5
Avelino	2019–20	Serie C	18	0	—		4 (Note: Appearance(s) in Coppa Italia Serie C)	0	22	0
Avelino	2020–21	Serie C	15	0	1	0	1 (Note: Appearance(s) in Playoffs Serie C)	0	17	0
Avelino	Total		33	0	1	0	5	0	39	0
Career total			63	4	1	0	7	1	71	5
