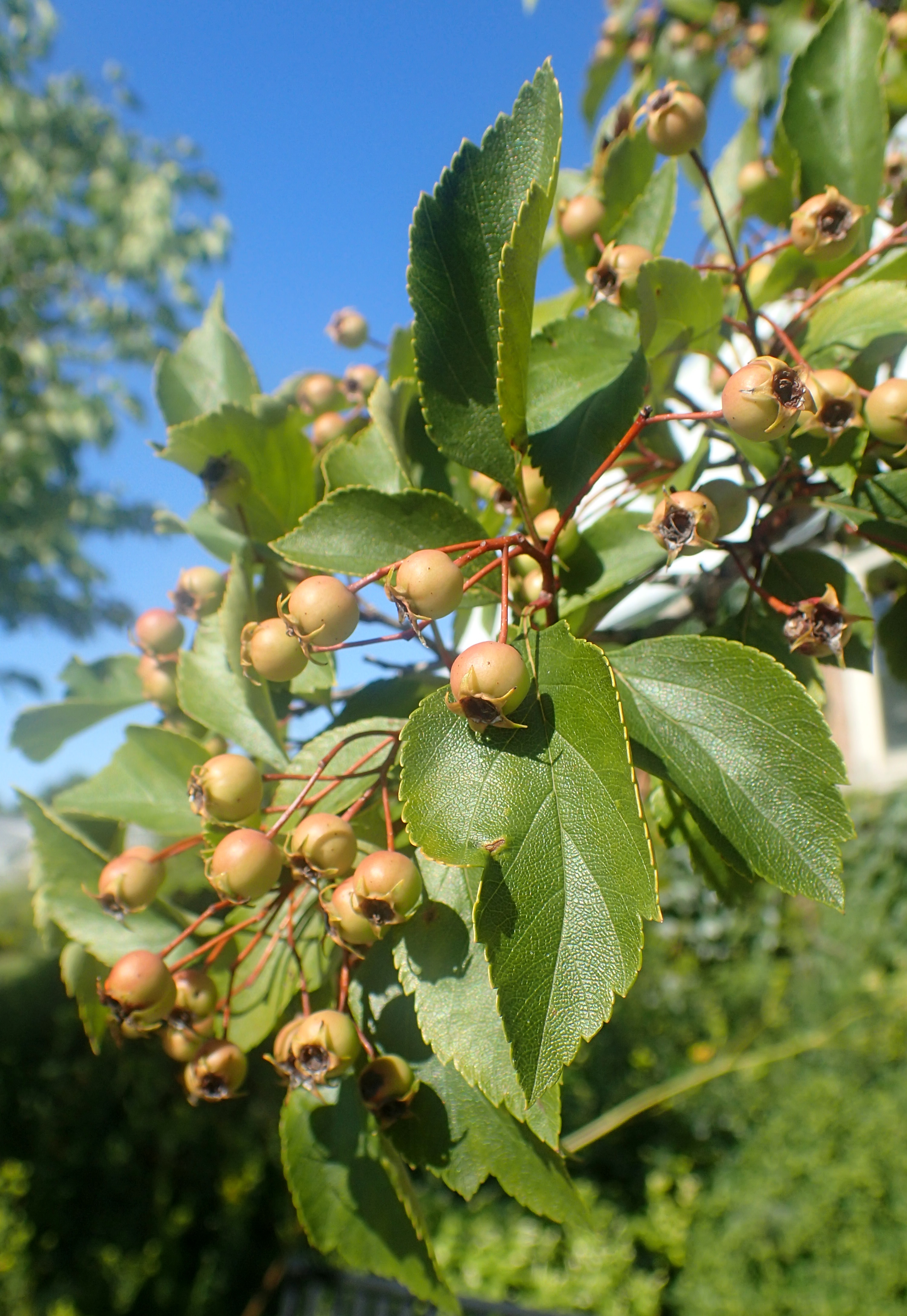
- At the Garfield Park Conservatory in Chicago

Scientific classification
- Kingdom: Plantae
- Clade: Tracheophytes
- Clade: Angiosperms
- Clade: Eudicots
- Clade: Rosids
- Order: Rosales
- Family: Rosaceae
- Genus: Crataegus
- Species: C. nitida

Binomial name
- Crataegus nitida (Engelm. ex Britton & N.E.Br.) Sarg.

= Crataegus nitida =

Species of flowering plant

Crataegus nitida, the glossy hawthorn or shining hawthorn, is a species of flowering plant in the family Rosaceae, native to the US states of Illinois, Missouri and Arkansas. Hardy to USDA zone 5, it is useful in landscaping applications where a small, showy tree with thorns is desired.
