= Silvestrii =

Silvestrii may refer to:

- Filippo Silvestri (1873–1949), an Italian entomologist
- Silvestri
