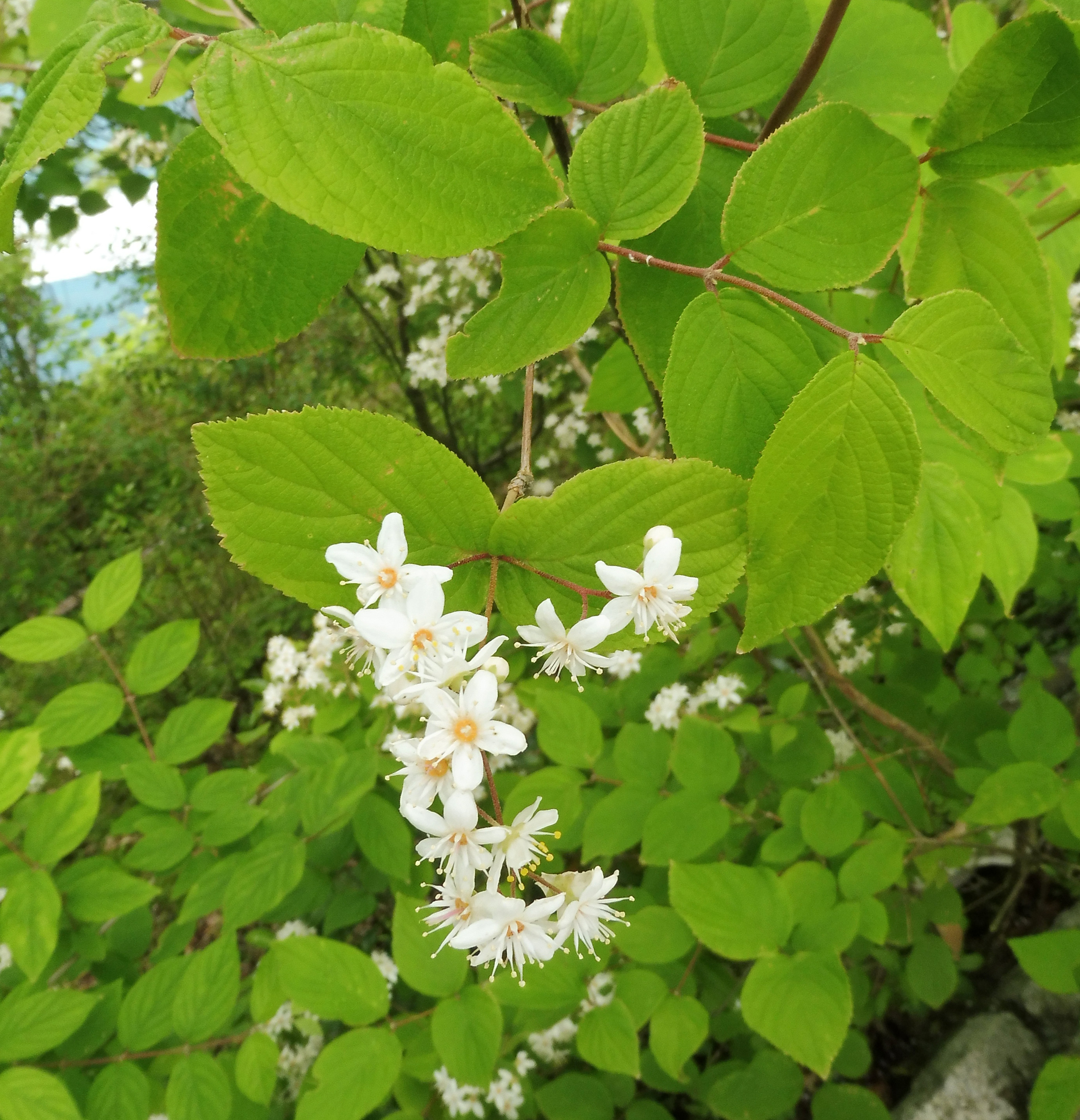

Scientific classification
- Kingdom: Plantae
- Clade: Tracheophytes
- Clade: Angiosperms
- Clade: Eudicots
- Clade: Asterids
- Order: Cornales
- Family: Hydrangeaceae
- Genus: Deutzia
- Species: D. scabra

Binomial name
- Deutzia scabra Thunb.

= Deutzia scabra =

Species of flowering plant

Deutzia scabra, known as Fuzzy Deutzia or Pride-of-Rochester, is a species of flowering plant in the hydrangea family (Hydrangeaceae) native to Japan and introduced to mainland east Asia, Europe, and North America. In its native Japan, it is found from the Kantō region, westward to the islands of Kyushu and Shikoku. Its natural habitat is along forest edges and rocky openings. It is tolerant of disturbance and can be found growing out of stone walls, along roadsides, and in other waste areas.

Deutzia scabra is a deciduous shrub growing 1–2 meters in height. One way it differs from other Deutzia of Japan, is by its somewhat dimorphic leaves: those subtending the inflorescence being sessile and slightly clasping, while leaves lower down the stem are petiolate. It produces panicles of white flowers, blooming from May to July.

The cultivar 'Candidissima' bears double flowers, and is taller than the species at up to 4 m (13 ft). It is a recipient of the Royal Horticultural Society's Award of Garden Merit. The pink flowered double 'Codsall Pink' has also received the award.
