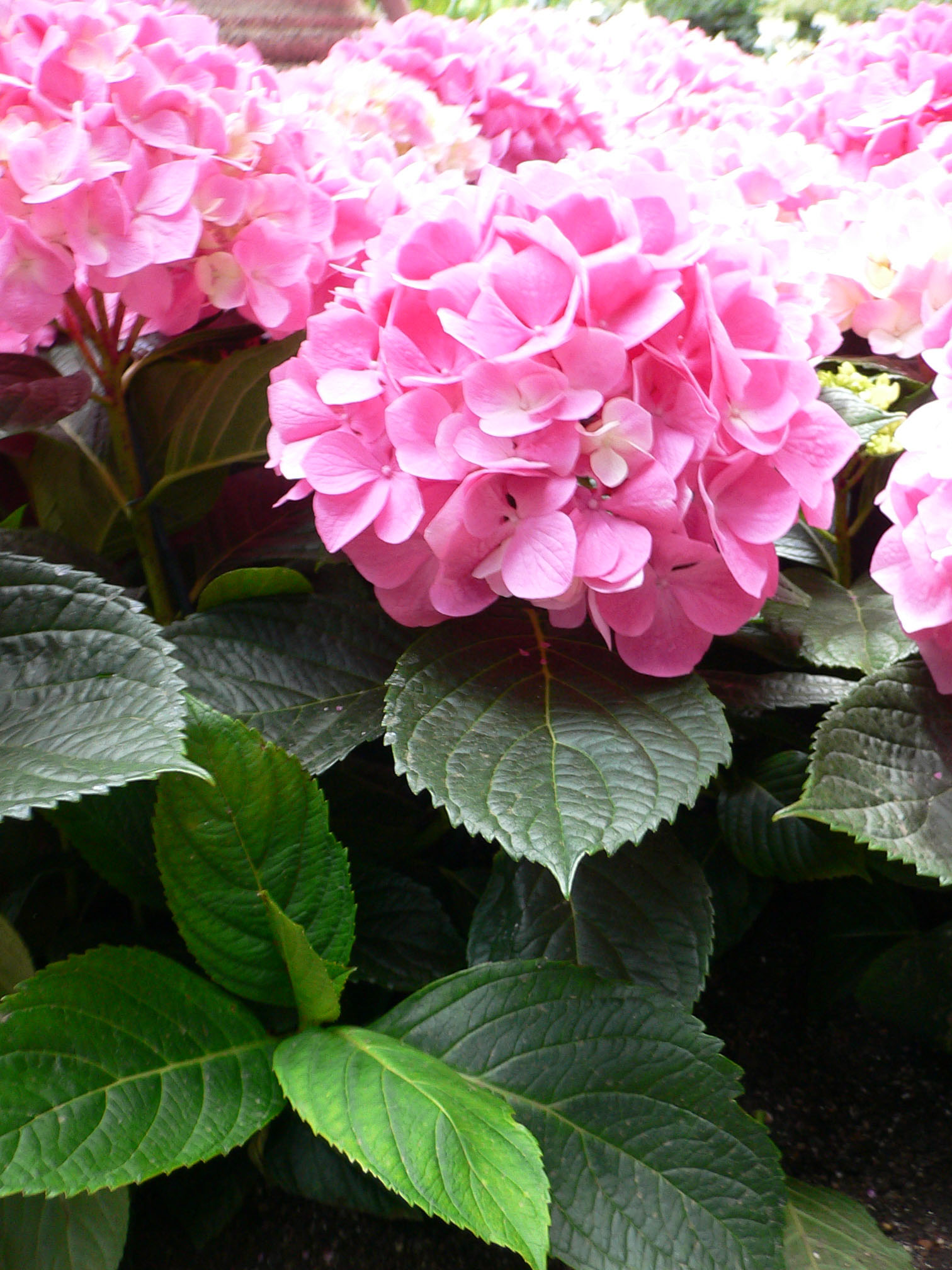
- Hydrangea macrophylla, a member of the subfamily Hydrangeoideae
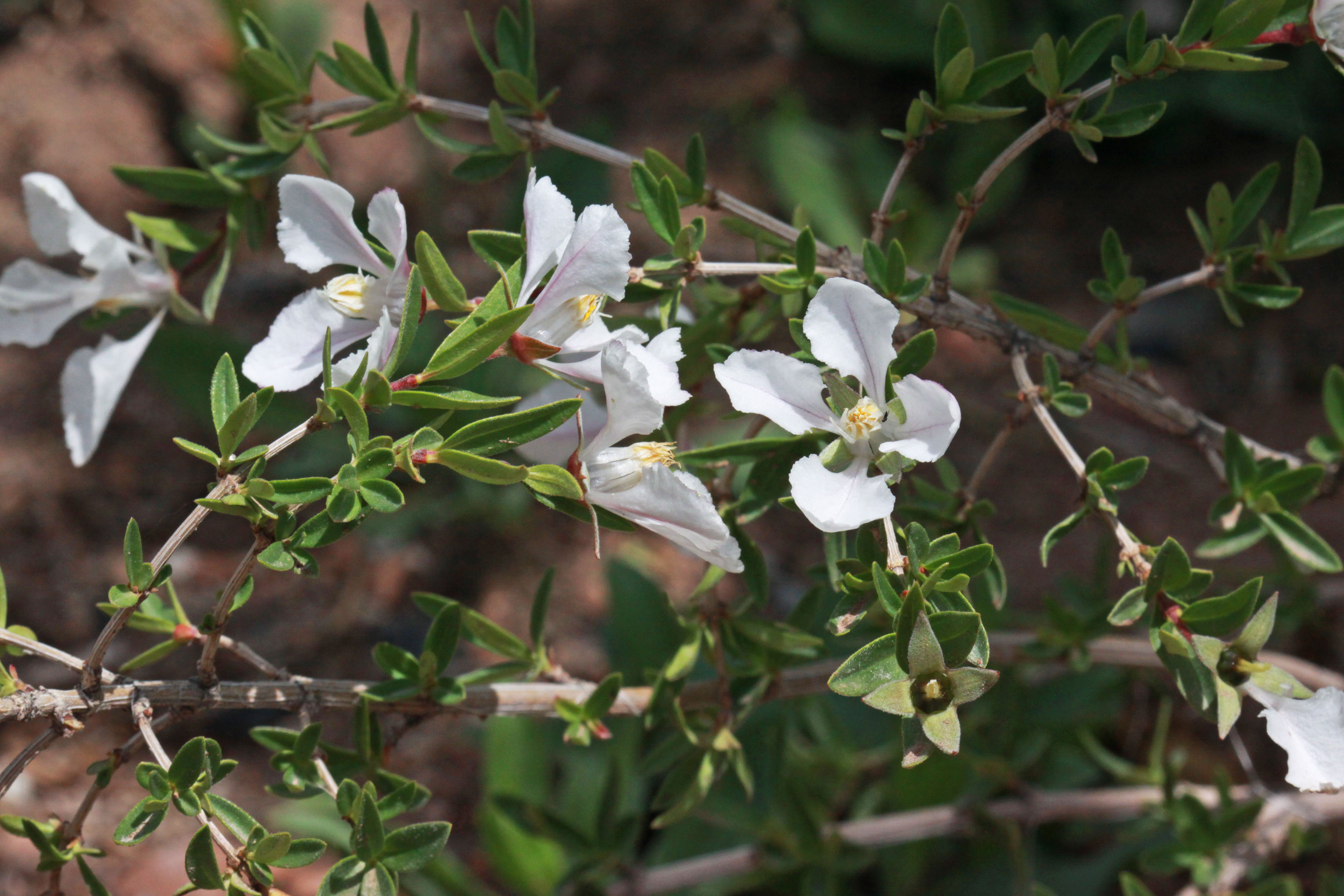
- Fendlera rupicola, a member of the subfamily Jamesioideae

Scientific classification
- Kingdom: Plantae
- Clade: Tracheophytes
- Clade: Angiosperms
- Clade: Eudicots
- Clade: Asterids
- Order: Cornales
- Family: Hydrangeaceae; Dumort.

Genera
- See text

Synonyms
- Kirengeshomaceae Nakai; Philadelphaceae Martinov

= Hydrangeaceae =

Family of flowering plants

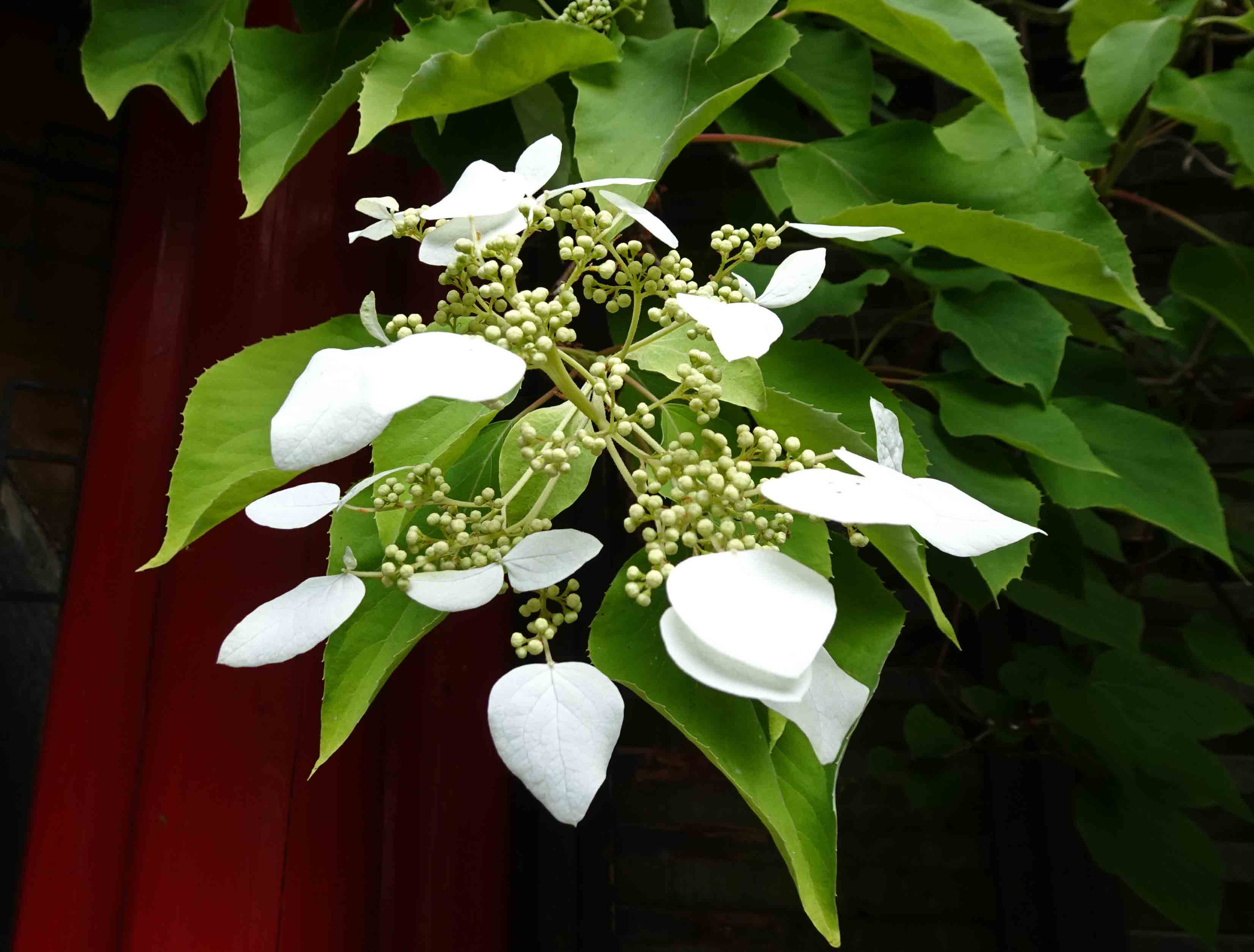
Hydrangea hydrangeoides, a member of the now-synonymised genus Schizophragma

Hydrangeaceae is a family of flowering plants in the order Cornales, with a wide distribution in Asia and North America, and locally in southeastern Europe.

== Description ==
The genera are characterised by leaves in opposite pairs (rarely whorled or alternate), and regular, bisexual flowers with four (rarely 5–12) petals. The fruit is a capsule or berry containing several seeds, the seeds with a fleshy endosperm.

== Genera ==
The following genera are accepted:

- Carpenteria Torr.
- Deutzia Thunb.
- Fendlera Engelm. & A.Gray
- Fendlerella A.Heller
- Hydrangea Gronov. ex L.
- Jamesia Torr. & A.Gray
- Kirengeshoma Yatabe
- Philadelphus L.
- Whipplea Torr.

== Phylogeny ==
The family Hydrangeaceae has two subfamilies, namely Jamesioideae and Hydrangeoideae. The subfamily Jamesioideae comprises the genera Jamesia and Fendlera. They are the sister group to the remaining Hydrangeaceae. The subfamily Hydrangeoideae has two tribes: Hydrangeae consists of Hydrangea s.l., and Philadelpheae consists of Philadelphus, Carpenteria, Deutzia, Kirengeshoma, Whipplea, and Fendlerella. Carpenteria is the sister group to Philadelphus. Deutzia is the sister group to Kirengeshoma, and Fendlerella is the sister group to Whipplea. However the relationships among those three clades within the tribe Philadelphae are a bit unclear. The following cladogram summarizes results from different studies, and for each node it is noted which studies support the sister group positions of the following branches:

- Hydrangeaceae
  - Hydrangeoideae
    - Hydrangeae
      Hydrangea s.l. (including Broussaisia, Cardiandra, Decumaria, Deinanthe, Dichroa, Pileostegia, Platycrater, and Schizophragma)
    - Philadelpheae
      - - Philadelphus
        - Carpenteria
      - - - Deutzia
          - Kirengeshoma
        - - Whipplea
          - Fendlerella
  - Jamesioideae
    - Jamesia
    - Fendlera
