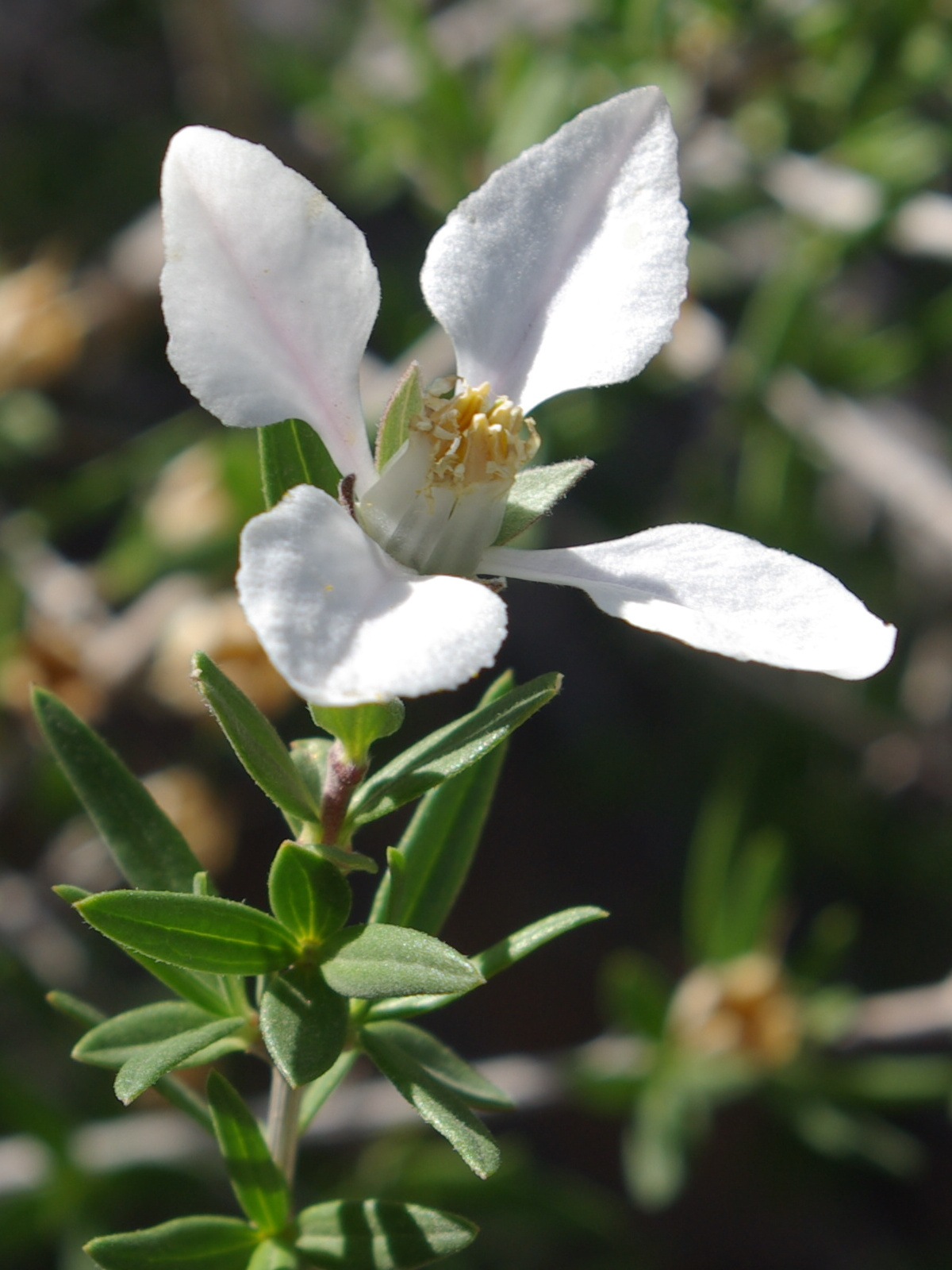

Conservation status
- Secure (NatureServe)

Scientific classification
- Kingdom: Plantae
- Clade: Tracheophytes
- Clade: Angiosperms
- Clade: Eudicots
- Clade: Asterids
- Order: Cornales
- Family: Hydrangeaceae
- Genus: Fendlera
- Species: F. rupicola

Binomial name
- Fendlera rupicola A.Gray

Synonyms
- Edwinia wrightii (Engelm. & A.Gray) A.Heller (1897); Fendlera falcata Thornber (1913); Fendlera tomentella Thornber ex Wooton & Standl. (1913); Fendlera wrightii (Engelm. & A.Gray) A.Heller (1897)

= Fendlera rupicola =

Plant species in the hydrangea family

Fendlera rupicola, commonly known as the cliff fendlerbush or the false mockorange, is a shrub that grows in dry locations in the south central mountain regions of North America.

== Description ==
The fendlerbush is a deciduous shrub that grows one to three metres tall. The branches are tough and wiry, grey with furrowed bark. The leaves are opposite, oblong, entire, thick and twisted, with three veins. The creamy-white flowers open at the end of short branches, either solitary or in groups of up to three. The four sepals are purplish, the four petals narrow to a claw at the base and there is a central boss with four styles and eight stamens. The fruits are capsules that remain on the plant for a long time.

== Distribution ==
This species is found in mountainous areas of Texas, New Mexico, Colorado, Utah and Arizona and the northern parts of Mexico. It is common in the Trans-Pecos region and is also found in the Davis Mountains, the Chisos Mountains and the Guadalupe Mountains.

== Habitat ==
The fendlerbush typically grows in semi-arid conditions in blue grama (Bouteloua gracilis) communities dominated by pinyon pine and juniper. It is found growing on dry rocky slopes, in deserts and on mesas. It often grows in association with oneseed juniper (Juniperus monosperma), alligator juniper (J. deppeana), true pinyon (Pinus edulis), gray oak (Quercus grisea), skunkbush sumac (Rhus trilobata), mountain mahogany (Cercocarpus breviflorus) and antelope bitterbrush (Purshia tridentata).

== Traditional uses ==
- Navajo Natives use an infusion of the inner bark of this plant when they have swallowed ants.
- Navajo Natives use this plant to kill head lice.
- Navajo Indians use this plant as a cathartic.
- Navajo Indians use this plant in their plumeway, nightway, male shootingway and windway ceremonies.
- Havasupai and Navajo Indians use the wood of this plant to make arrow shafts.
- Hopi Indians use the plant in religious ceremonies
- Navajo Indians use wood from this plant to make notched and smooth sticks which are rubbed together in their mountain chant ceremony.
- Navajo Indians use the wood to make weaving forks, planting sticks and knitting needles.
- Navajo Indians use the plant boiled with juniper berries, pinon buds and corn meal in their mush-eating ceremonies.
