= Wax flower =

Wax flower or waxflower may refer to:

- Artificial flower with wax used as adhesive
- Chamelaucium, shrub endemic to Western Australia
- Etlingera, herbaceous plant native to southern Asia and Australia
- Hoya, climbing plant native to southern Asia
- Jamesia, shrub native to western North America
- Moneses, wintergreen that grows in North America

== See also ==
- Wax plant
