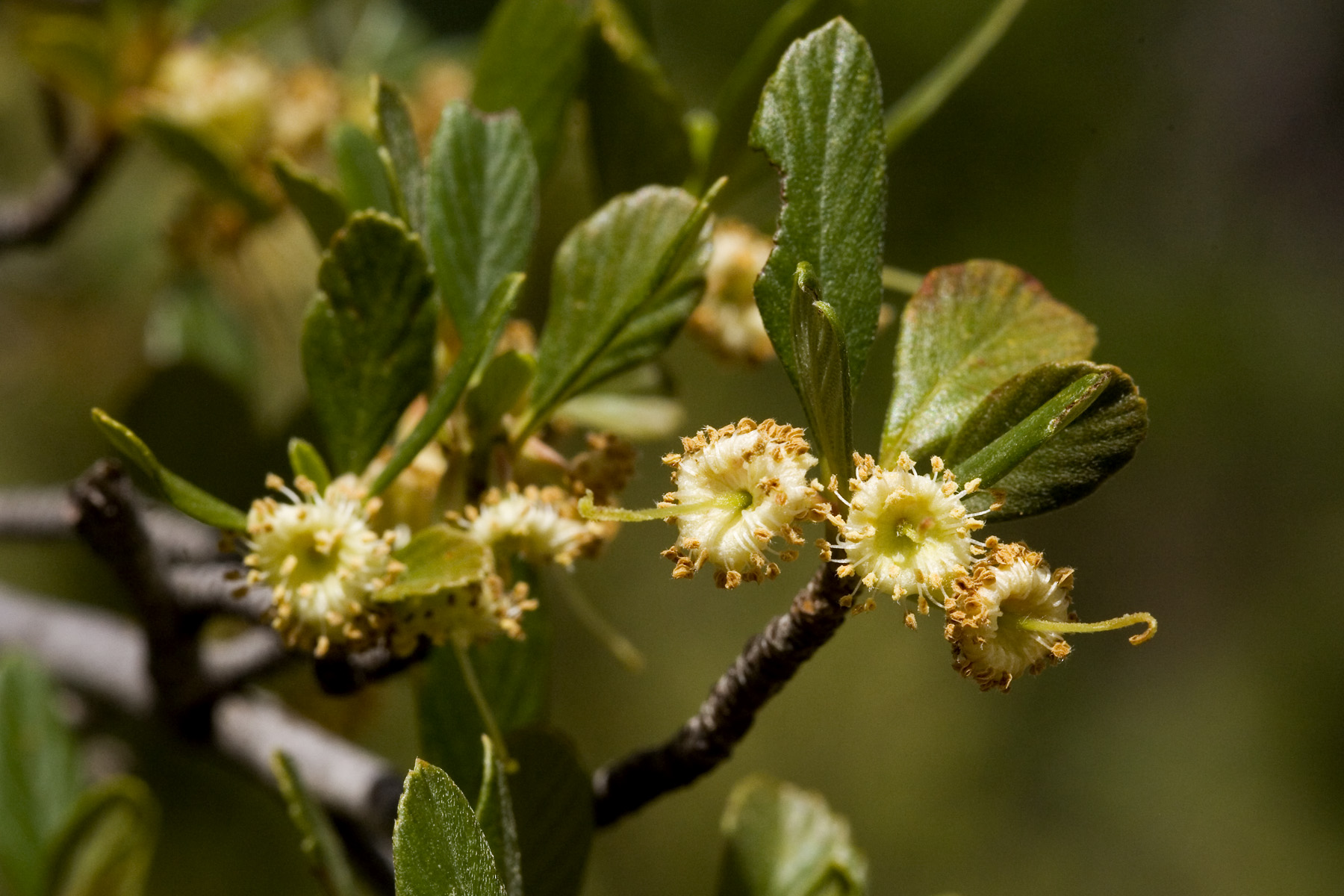

Scientific classification
- Kingdom: Plantae
- Clade: Tracheophytes
- Clade: Angiosperms
- Clade: Eudicots
- Clade: Rosids
- Order: Rosales
- Family: Rosaceae
- Genus: Cercocarpus
- Species: C. breviflorus

Binomial name
- Cercocarpus breviflorus A.Gray 1853
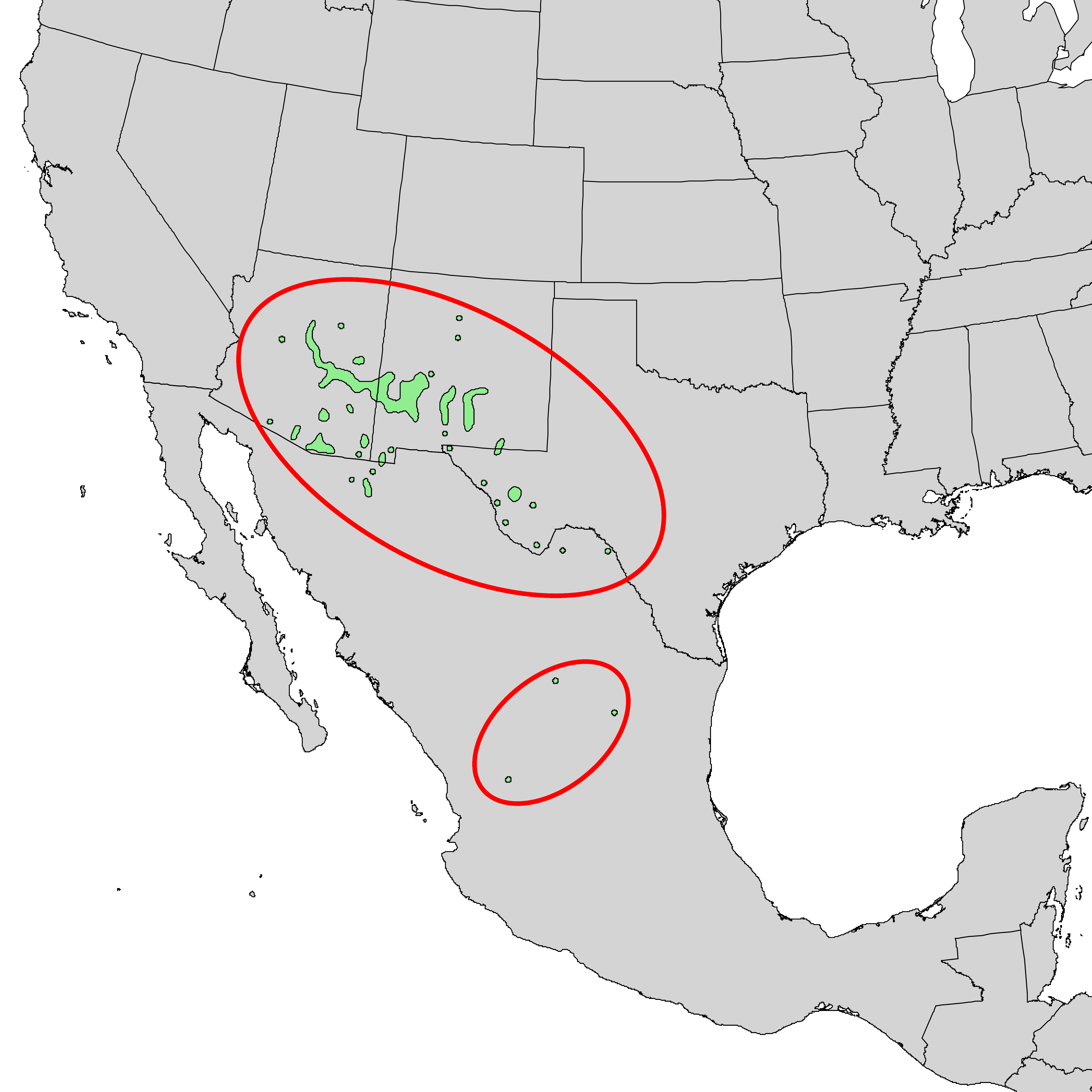

Synonyms
- Cercocarpus montanus Rafinesque var. paucidentatus (S. Watson) F.L. Martin; Cercocarpus eximius (C.K.Schneid.) Rydb.; Cercocarpus paucidentatus (S. Watson) Britton

= Cercocarpus breviflorus =

Desert mountain mahogany

Species of plant

Cercocarpus breviflorus, commonly known as desert mountain mahogany or hairy mountain mahogany, is a species of plant in the rose family, native to northern Mexico and the southwestern United States.

== Description ==
Cercocarpus breviflorus is an evergreen tree or large shrub growing to about 5 metres (16 ft) tall, often with several branches springing from the base. The small leaves are oblong to oblanceolate, up to 2 cm (1 in) long, pubescent and entire apart from a few weak teeth near the apex. They are fasciculate, with groups of two to four leaves forming small tufts separated by lengths of bare twig. The yellowish-green tubed flowers are inconspicuous and grow from the axils of the leaves. The fruits are achenes with twisted, hairy, elongated and persistent styles, looking like long narrow feathers.

== Distribution and habitat ==
Hairy mountain mahogany occurs in mountainous parts of the southwestern United States (Texas, New Mexico, Arizona) and northern Mexico (from Sonora to Tamaulipas, south as far as Querétaro), on both limestone and igneous rock.

== Ecology ==
Hairy mountain mahogany grows at moderately high elevations, often in the company of pinyon pine (Pinus edulis), alligator juniper (Juniperus deppeana), one-seed juniper (Juniperus monosperma), cliff fendlerbush (Fendlera rupicola), antelope bitterbrush (Purshia tridentata), wavyleaf oak (Quercus x undulata), and skunkbush sumac (Rhus trilobata). The branches are often heavily encrusted with lichens.
