= Digrammia pallorata =

Scientific classification
- Domain: Eukaryota
- Kingdom: Animalia
- Phylum: Arthropoda
- Class: Insecta
- Order: Lepidoptera
- Family: Geometridae
- Genus: Digrammia
- Species: D. pallorata

Binomial name
- Digrammia pallorata Ferguson, 2008

Species of moth

Digrammia pallorata is a species of moth in the family Geometridae (geometrid moths). It was described by Douglas C. Ferguson in 2008 and is found in North America, where it has been recorded from Utah, Colorado, Nevada, Texas, New Mexico, Arizona and California.

The length of the forewings is 11–14 mm for males and 14–16 mm for females.

The larvae feed on Juniperus monosperma and Juniperus pinhotii.

The MONA or Hodges number for Digrammia pallorata is 6363.1.
