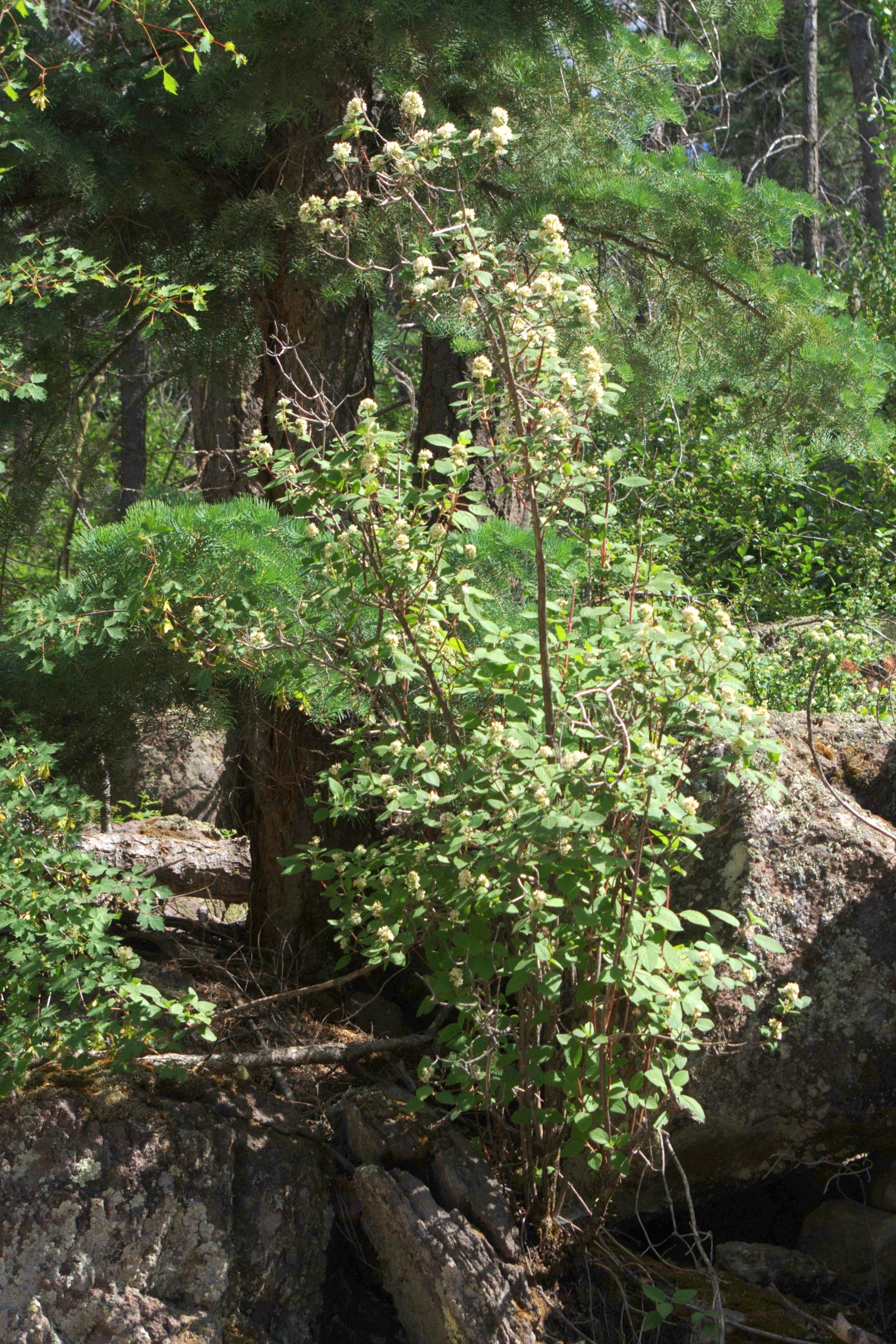
- Jamesia americana

Scientific classification
- Kingdom: Plantae
- Clade: Tracheophytes
- Clade: Angiosperms
- Clade: Eudicots
- Clade: Asterids
- Order: Cornales
- Family: Hydrangeaceae
- Subfamily: Jamesioideae; L.Hufford

Genera
- Fendlera Engelm. & Gray; Jamesia Torr. & A.Gray

= Jamesioideae =

Subfamily of plants

Jamesioideae is a subfamily of the hydrangea family (Hydrangeaceae). It contains two genera, Fendlera and Jamesia. The subfamily was described by Larry Hufford in 2001.
