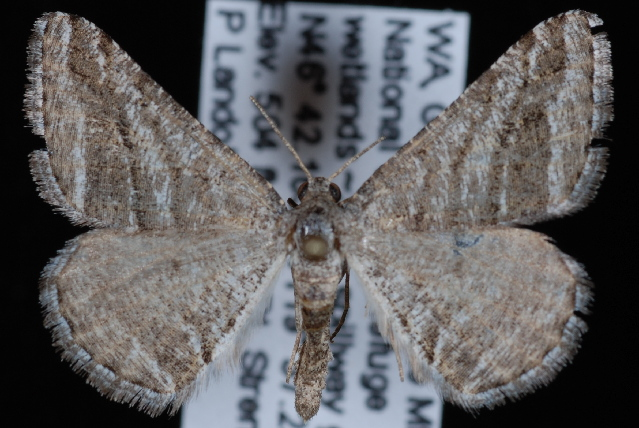

Scientific classification
- Kingdom: Animalia
- Phylum: Arthropoda
- Clade: Pancrustacea
- Class: Insecta
- Order: Lepidoptera
- Family: Geometridae
- Genus: Digrammia
- Species: D. nubiculata

Binomial name
- Digrammia nubiculata (Packard, 1876)

Synonyms
- Phasiane nubiculata Packard, 1876

= Digrammia nubiculata =

Species of moth

Digrammia nubiculata is a species of geometrid moth in the family Geometridae. It is found in North America.

The MONA number for Digrammia nubiculata is 910784 & Hodges number for Digrammia nubiculata is 6371.
