= Digrammia sexpunctata =

Scientific classification
- Domain: Eukaryota
- Kingdom: Animalia
- Phylum: Arthropoda
- Class: Insecta
- Order: Lepidoptera
- Family: Geometridae
- Genus: Digrammia
- Species: D. sexpunctata

Binomial name
- Digrammia sexpunctata (Bates, 1886)

Synonyms
- Semiothisa sexpunctata Bates, 1886

Species of moth

Digrammia sexpunctata, the six-spotted digrammia, is a moth in the family Geometridae described by J. Elwyn Bates in 1886. It is found in North America.

The MONA or Hodges number for Digrammia sexpunctata is 6387.1.
