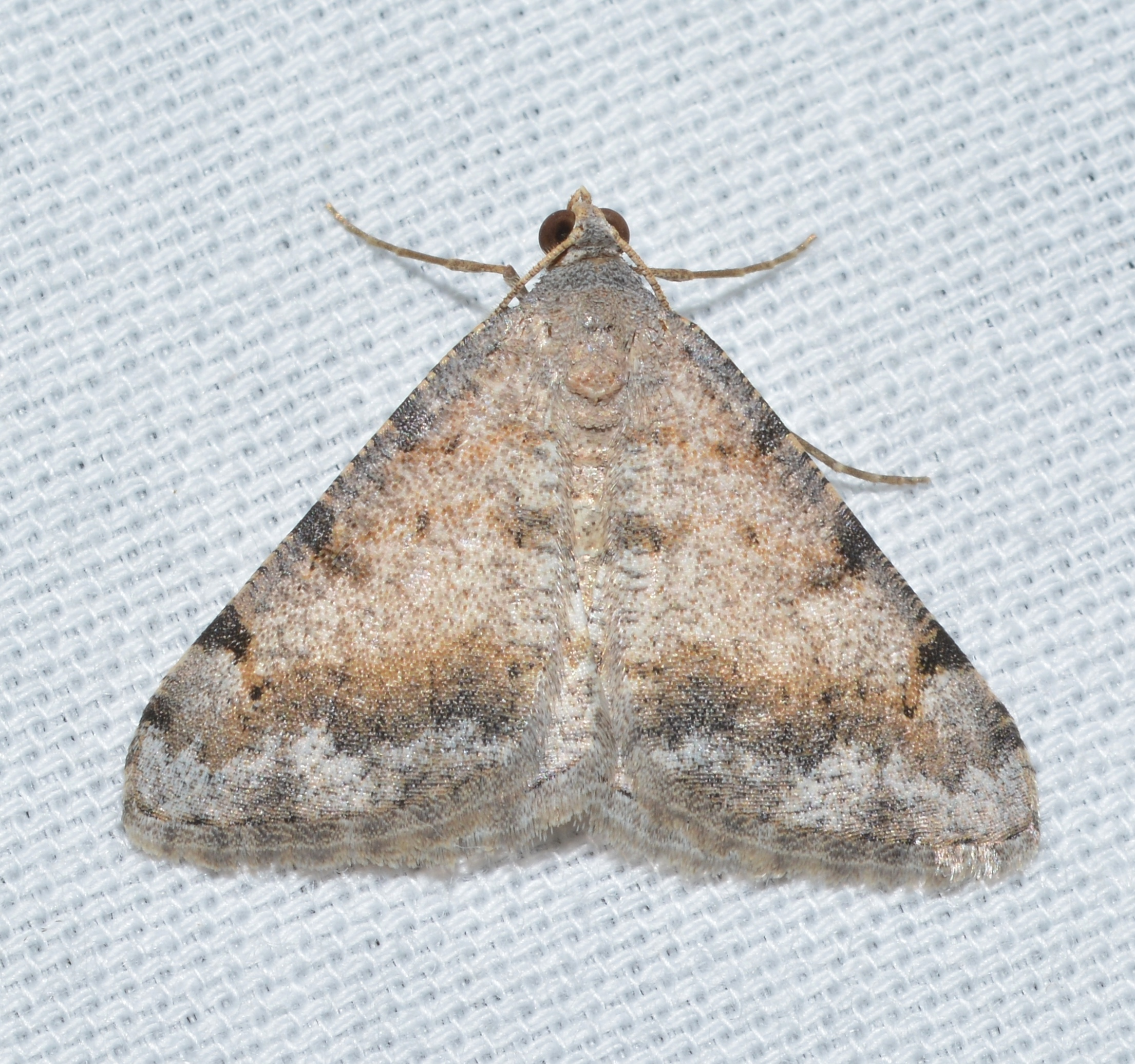

Scientific classification
- Kingdom: Animalia
- Phylum: Arthropoda
- Clade: Pancrustacea
- Class: Insecta
- Order: Lepidoptera
- Family: Geometridae
- Genus: Digrammia
- Species: D. colorata

Binomial name
- Digrammia colorata (Grote, 1883)

Synonyms
- Cleora godmani Druce, 1892; Sciagraphia conarata Grossbeck, 1908; Semiothisa colorata Grote, 1883

= Digrammia colorata =

Species of moth

Digrammia colorata, the creosote moth, is a species of geometrid moth in the family Geometridae.
