= Digrammia hebetata =

Scientific classification
- Domain: Eukaryota
- Kingdom: Animalia
- Phylum: Arthropoda
- Class: Insecta
- Order: Lepidoptera
- Family: Geometridae
- Genus: Digrammia
- Species: D. hebetata

Binomial name
- Digrammia hebetata (Hulst, 1881)

Synonyms
- Phasiane hebetata Hulst, 1881; Phasiane tulareata Cassino and Swett, 1923

Species of moth

Digrammia hebetata is a species of geometrid moth in the family Geometridae. It is found in North America.

The MONA or Hodges number for Digrammia hebetata is 6394.1.
