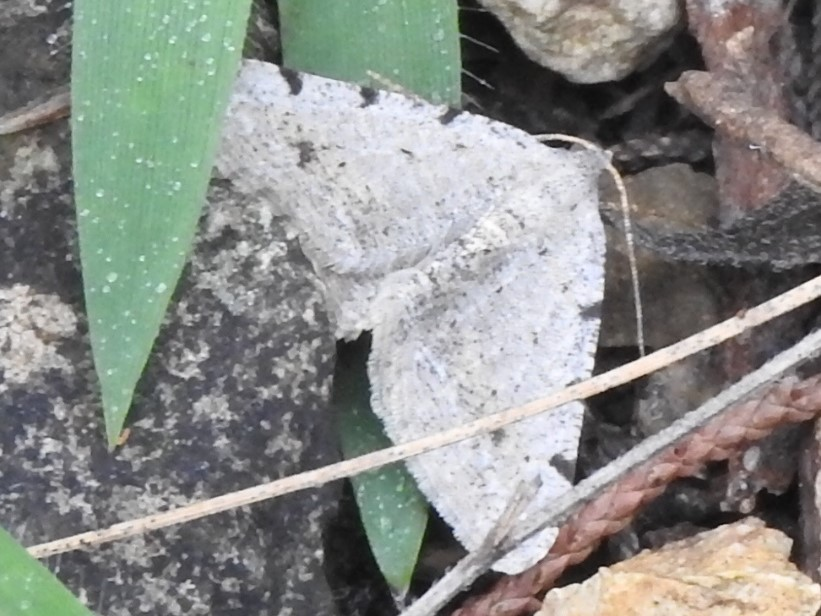

Scientific classification
- Kingdom: Animalia
- Phylum: Arthropoda
- Clade: Pancrustacea
- Class: Insecta
- Order: Lepidoptera
- Family: Geometridae
- Genus: Digrammia
- Species: D. pallidata

Binomial name
- Digrammia pallidata (Packard, 1873)

Synonyms
- List: Digrammia azureata (Cassino, 1928); Macaria azureata (Cassino, 1928); Macaria pallidata Packard, 1873; Semiothisa azureata (Cassino, 1928)

= Digrammia pallidata =

Species of moth

Digrammia pallidata is a species of geometrid moth in the family Geometridae. It is found in North America.
