= Digrammia palodurata =

Scientific classification
- Domain: Eukaryota
- Kingdom: Animalia
- Phylum: Arthropoda
- Class: Insecta
- Order: Lepidoptera
- Family: Geometridae
- Tribe: Macariini
- Genus: Digrammia
- Species: D. palodurata

Binomial name
- Digrammia palodurata Ferguson, 2008

Species of moth

Digrammia palodurata is a species of geometrid moth in the family Geometridae. It is found in North America.

The MONA or Hodges number for Digrammia palodurata is 6371.1.
