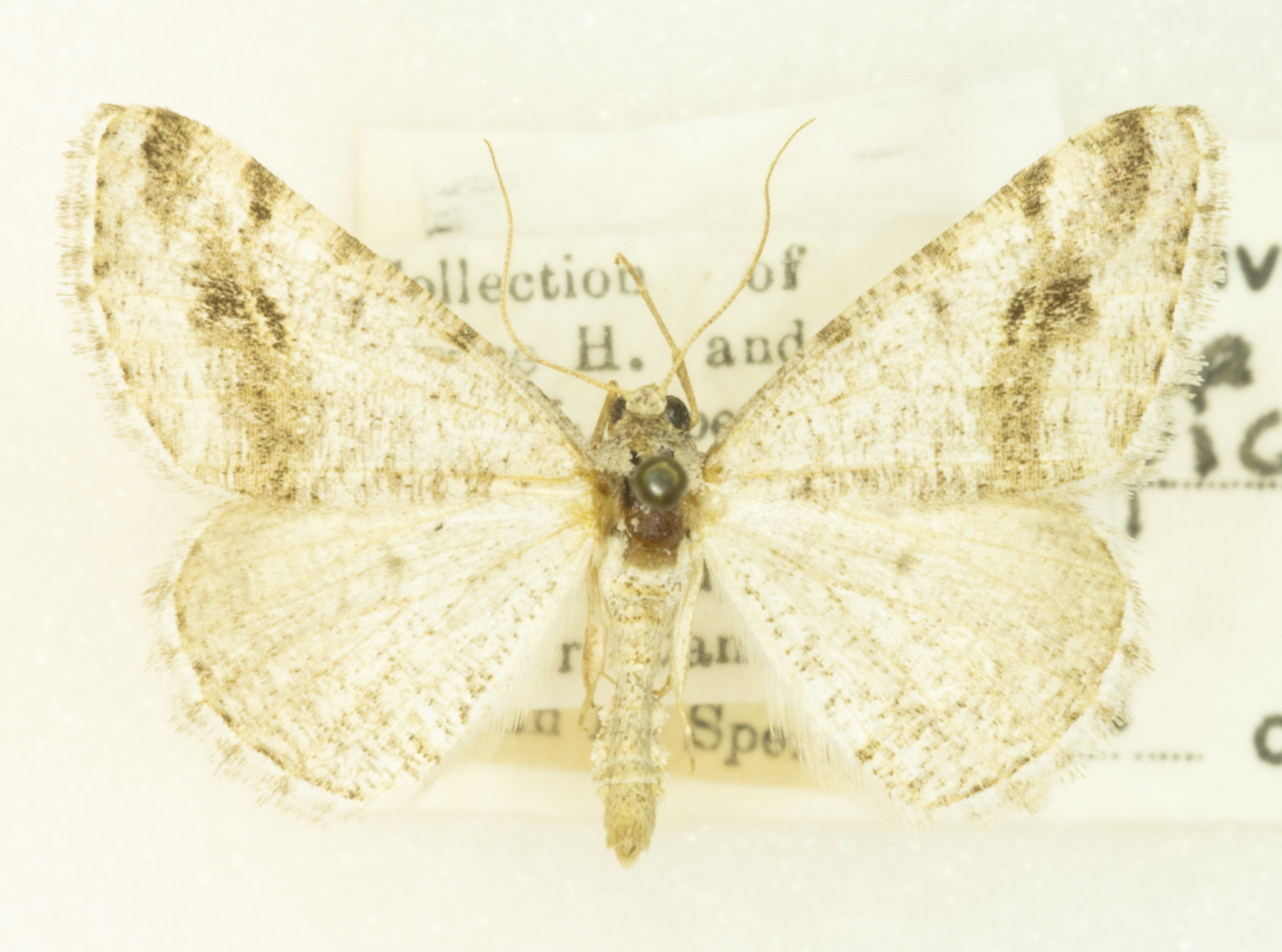
- Digrammia pictipennata

Scientific classification
- Domain: Eukaryota
- Kingdom: Animalia
- Phylum: Arthropoda
- Class: Insecta
- Order: Lepidoptera
- Family: Geometridae
- Genus: Digrammia
- Species: D. pictipennata

Binomial name
- Digrammia pictipennata (Hulst, 1898)

Synonyms
- Macaria pictipennata Hulst, 1898

= Digrammia pictipennata =

Species of moth

Digrammia pictipennata is a species of geometrid moth in the family Geometridae. It is found in Central America and North America.

The MONA or Hodges number for Digrammia pictipennata is 6372.
