= Digrammia ordinata =

Scientific classification
- Kingdom: Animalia
- Phylum: Arthropoda
- Class: Insecta
- Order: Lepidoptera
- Family: Geometridae
- Genus: Digrammia
- Species: D. ordinata

Binomial name
- Digrammia ordinata (Walker, 1862)

Synonyms
- Fidonia ordinata Walker, 1862; Macaria aucillaria Strecker, 1899; Sciagraphia maculifascia Hulst, 1896; Semiothisa maculifascia (Hulst, 1896)

Species of moth

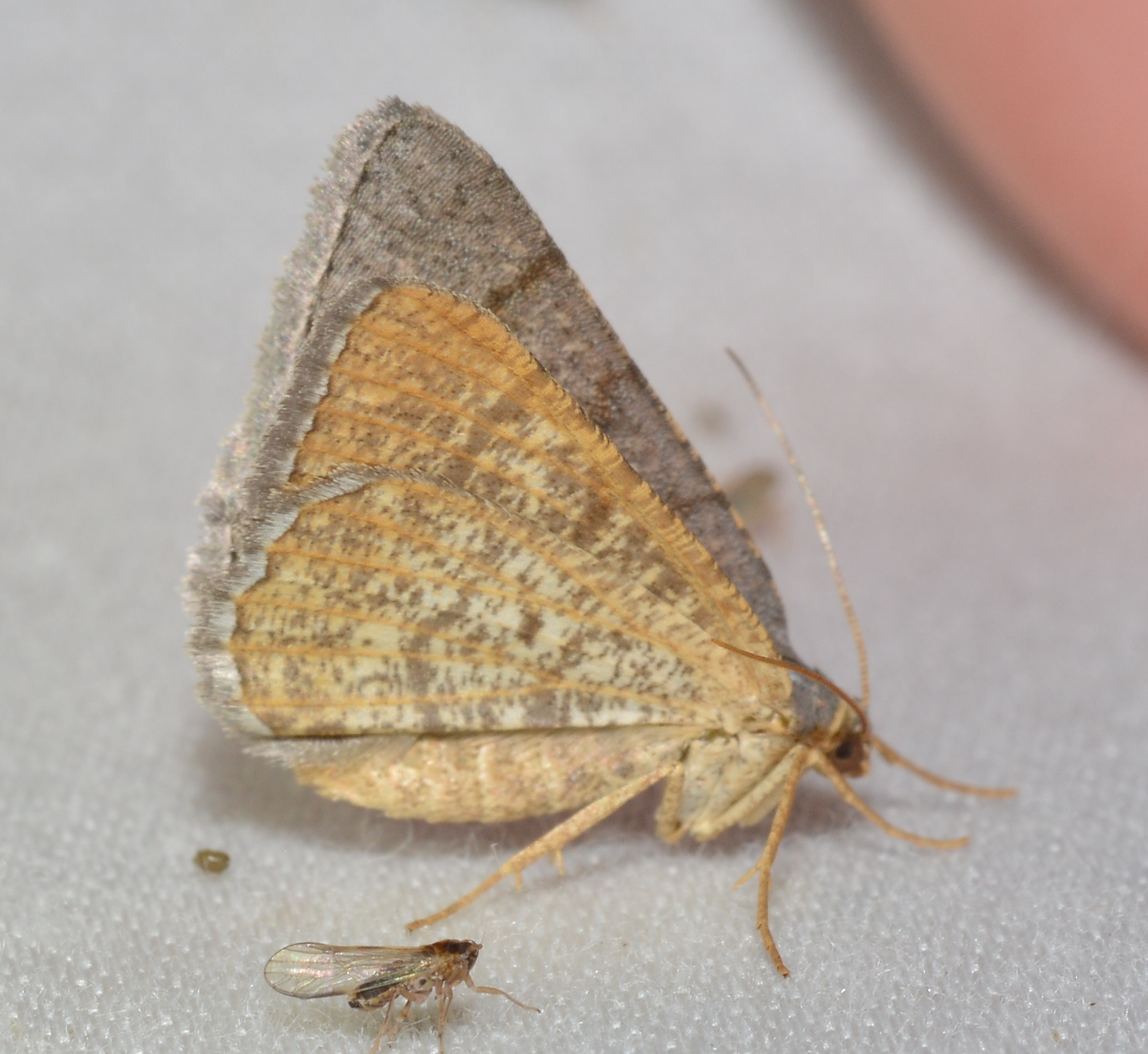
Digrammia ordinata

Digrammia ordinata, the amorpha angle, is a species of geometrid moth in the family Geometridae. It is found in North America.

The MONA or Hodges number for Digrammia ordinata is 6358.
