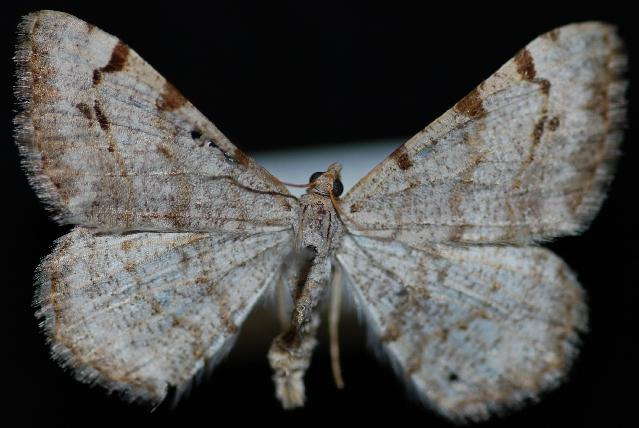

Scientific classification
- Kingdom: Animalia
- Phylum: Arthropoda
- Clade: Pancrustacea
- Class: Insecta
- Order: Lepidoptera
- Family: Geometridae
- Genus: Digrammia
- Species: D. denticulata

Binomial name
- Digrammia denticulata (Grote, 1883)

Synonyms
- Semiothisa denticulata Grote, 1883

= Digrammia denticulata =

Species of moth

Digrammia denticulata is a species of geometrid moth in the family Geometridae.

The MONA or Hodges number for Digrammia denticulata is 6373.
