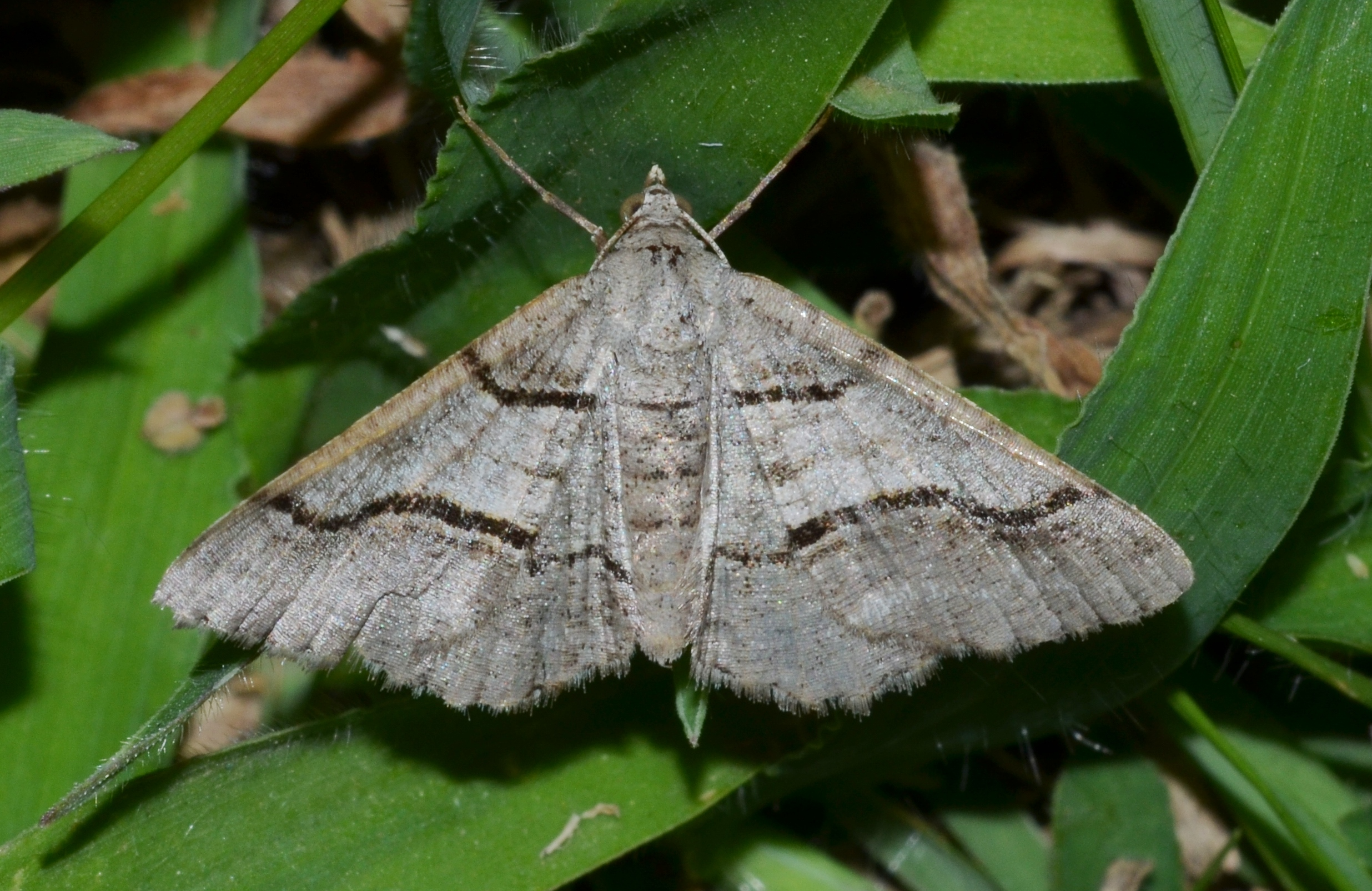

Scientific classification
- Kingdom: Animalia
- Phylum: Arthropoda
- Class: Insecta
- Order: Lepidoptera
- Family: Geometridae
- Genus: Digrammia
- Species: D. continuata

Binomial name
- Digrammia continuata (Walker, 1862)

Synonyms
- Anaitis continuata Walker, 1862; Anaitis orillata Walker, 1863; Aspilates strigularia Walker, 1863

= Digrammia continuata =

Species of moth

Digrammia continuata, the curve-lined angle, is a species of moth of the family Geometridae. It is found in North America, where it has been recorded from New Brunswick to Florida, west to California and north to Manitoba.

The wingspan is about 22–24 mm. Adults are on wing from March to August in two generations per year.

The larvae feed on Juniperus virginiana and Thuja occidentalis. Full-grown larvae reach a length of about 29 mm. The species overwinters in the pupal stage in soil or amongst debris.
