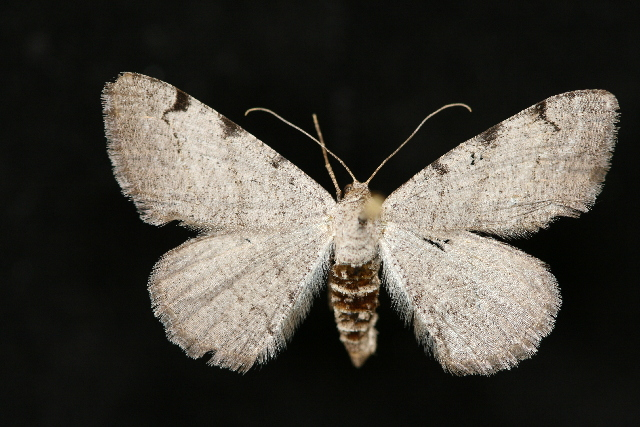

Scientific classification
- Domain: Eukaryota
- Kingdom: Animalia
- Phylum: Arthropoda
- Class: Insecta
- Order: Lepidoptera
- Family: Geometridae
- Genus: Digrammia
- Species: D. triviata

Binomial name
- Digrammia triviata (Barnes & McDunnough, 1917)

Synonyms
- Digrammia woodgateata (Cassino, 1928); Phasiane triviata Barnes & McDunnough, 1917; Phasiane woodgateata Cassino, 1928; Semiothisa woodgateata (Cassino, 1928)

= Digrammia triviata =

Species of moth

Digrammia triviata is a species of moth in the family Geometridae first described by William Barnes and James Halliday McDunnough in 1917. It is found in North America.

The MONA or Hodges number for Digrammia triviata is 6385.
