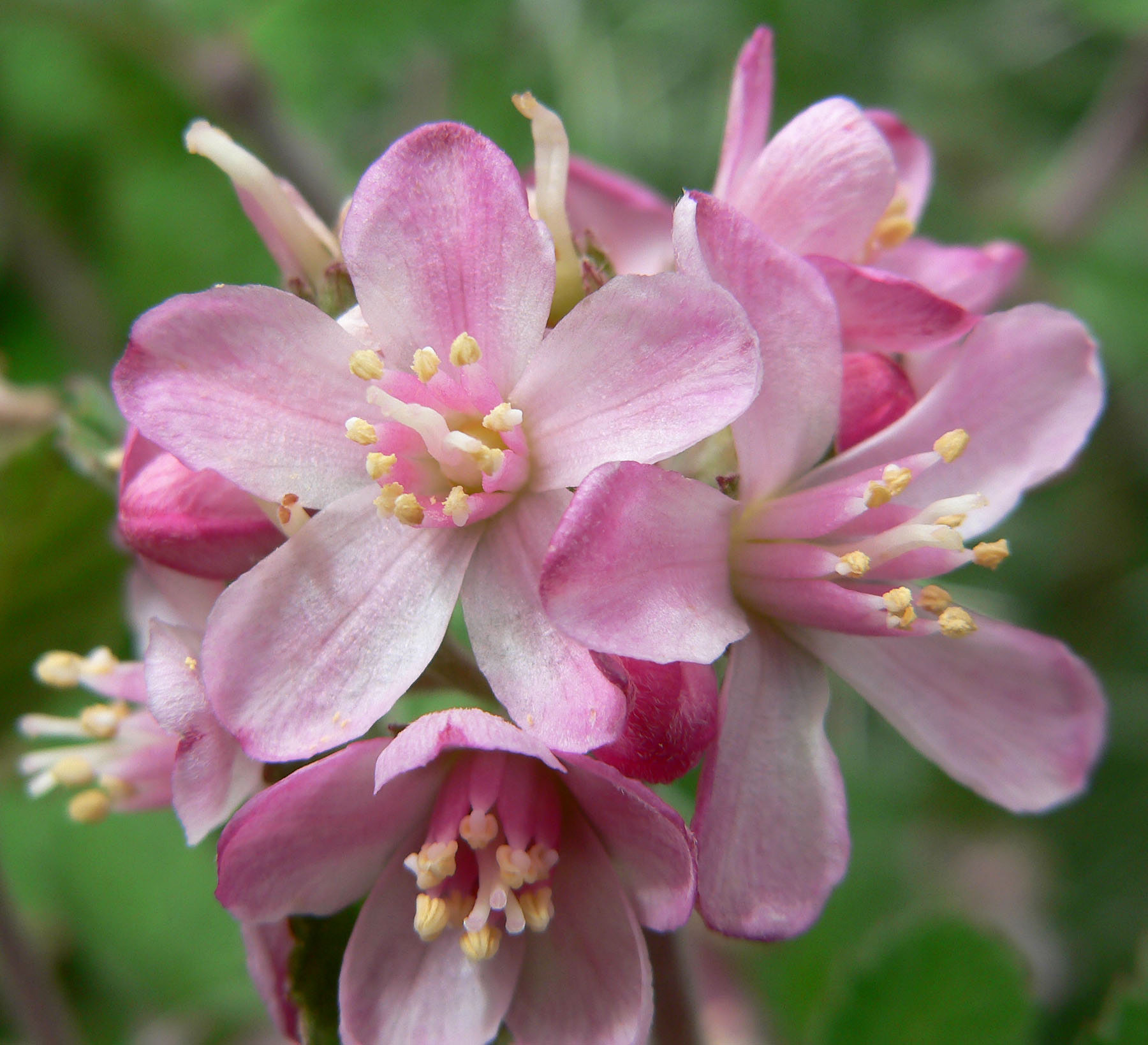
- Jamesia americana in the Spring Mountains of southern Nevada

Conservation status
- Secure (NatureServe)

Scientific classification
- Kingdom: Plantae
- Clade: Embryophytes
- Clade: Tracheophytes
- Clade: Spermatophytes
- Clade: Angiosperms
- Clade: Eudicots
- Clade: Asterids
- Order: Cornales
- Family: Hydrangeaceae
- Genus: Jamesia
- Species: J. americana

Binomial name
- Jamesia americana Torr. & A.Gray, 1840

Varieties
- Jamesia americana var. americana; Jamesia americana var. macrocalyx Engl.; Jamesia americana var. rosea Purpus ex C.K.Schneid.; Jamesia americana var. zionis N.H.Holmgren & P.K.Holmgren

Synonyms
- Edwinia americana (Torr. & A.Gray) A.Heller (1897)

= Jamesia americana =

Plant species in the hydrangea family

Jamesia americana, also called cliffbush, waxflower or five petal cliffbush, is a species of flowering plant in the Hydrangeaceae.

== Description ==
Jamesia americana is a perennial shrub distributed throughout the southern Sierra Nevada and Rocky Mountains, and is widespread in the Four Corners region and southern Wyoming. It is distinguished from the similar Jamesia tetrapetala in that J. americana has many flower heads with five petals.

== Systematics ==
There are several varieties of Jamesia americana. These include:

- Jamesia americana var. americana
- Jamesia americana var. macrocalyx Engl.
- Jamesia americana var. rosea Purpus ex C.K.Schneid.
- Jamesia americana var. zionis N.H.Holmgren & P.K.Holmgren
