= Digrammia subminiata =

Scientific classification
- Kingdom: Animalia
- Phylum: Arthropoda
- Clade: Pancrustacea
- Class: Insecta
- Order: Lepidoptera
- Family: Geometridae
- Genus: Digrammia
- Species: D. subminiata

Binomial name
- Digrammia subminiata (Packard, 1873)

Synonyms
- Panagra subminiata Packard, 1873; Phasiane meadiaria Packard, 1874; Phasiane snoviata Packard, 1876; Semiothisa meadiaria; Semiothisa snoviata; Semiothisa subminiata

Species of moth

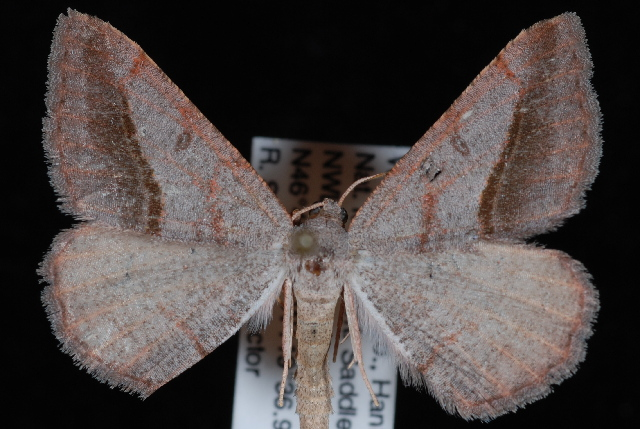
Digrammia subminiata

Digrammia subminiata, the vermillion granite or dark-waved angle, is a moth of the family Geometridae. The species was first described by Alpheus Spring Packard in 1873. It is found in western North America from British Columbia to Manitoba, south through Colorado to Arizona and California.

The wingspan is 20–25 mm. Adults are on wing from late May to late July.

The larvae feed on Salix species.
