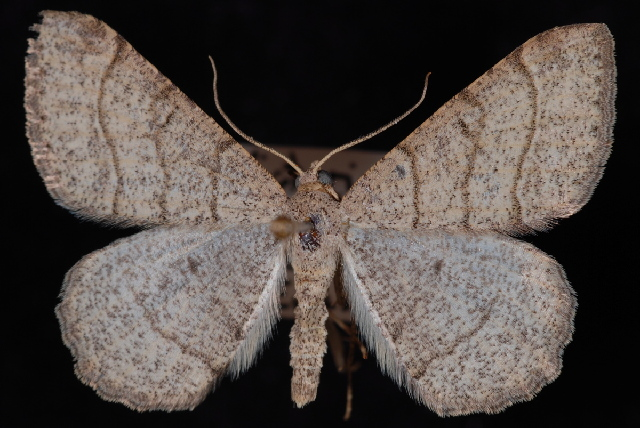

Scientific classification
- Kingdom: Animalia
- Phylum: Arthropoda
- Class: Insecta
- Order: Lepidoptera
- Family: Geometridae
- Tribe: Macariini
- Genus: Digrammia
- Species: D. muscariata

Binomial name
- Digrammia muscariata (Guenée in Boisduval & Guenée, 1858)

= Digrammia muscariata =

Species of moth

Digrammia muscariata is a species of geometrid moth in the family Geometridae. It is found in North America.

The MONA or Hodges number for Digrammia muscariata is 6377.

== Subspecies ==
These three subspecies belong to the species Digrammia muscariata:

- Digrammia muscariata muscariata (Guenée in Boisduval & Guenée, 1858)
- Digrammia muscariata respersata (Hulst, 1880)
- Digrammia muscariata teucaria (Strecker, 1899)
