= Digrammia yavapai =

Scientific classification
- Kingdom: Animalia
- Phylum: Arthropoda
- Clade: Pancrustacea
- Class: Insecta
- Order: Lepidoptera
- Family: Geometridae
- Genus: Digrammia
- Species: D. yavapai

Binomial name
- Digrammia yavapai (Grossbeck, 1907)

Synonyms
- Sciagraphia yavapai Grossbeck, 1907

Species of moth

Digrammia yavapai is a species of geometrid moth in the family Geometridae. It is found in North America.
