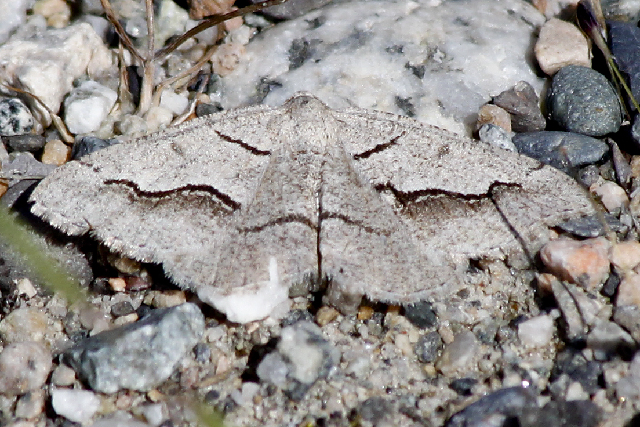

Scientific classification
- Domain: Eukaryota
- Kingdom: Animalia
- Phylum: Arthropoda
- Class: Insecta
- Order: Lepidoptera
- Family: Geometridae
- Tribe: Macariini
- Genus: Digrammia
- Species: D. decorata

Binomial name
- Digrammia decorata (Grossbeck, 1907)

Synonyms
- Semiothisa arubrescens McDunnough, 1939

= Digrammia decorata =

Species of moth

Digrammia decorata, the decorated granite, is a species of geometrid moth in the family Geometridae. It is found in North America.

The MONA or Hodges number for Digrammia decorata is 6389.
