= Digrammia mellistrigata =

Scientific classification
- Kingdom: Animalia
- Phylum: Arthropoda
- Clade: Pancrustacea
- Class: Insecta
- Order: Lepidoptera
- Family: Geometridae
- Genus: Digrammia
- Species: D. mellistrigata

Binomial name
- Digrammia mellistrigata (Grote, 1873)

Synonyms
- Phasiane mellistrigata Grote, 1873

Species of moth

Digrammia mellistrigata, the yellow-lined angle, is a species of geometrid moth in the family Geometridae. It is found in North America.
