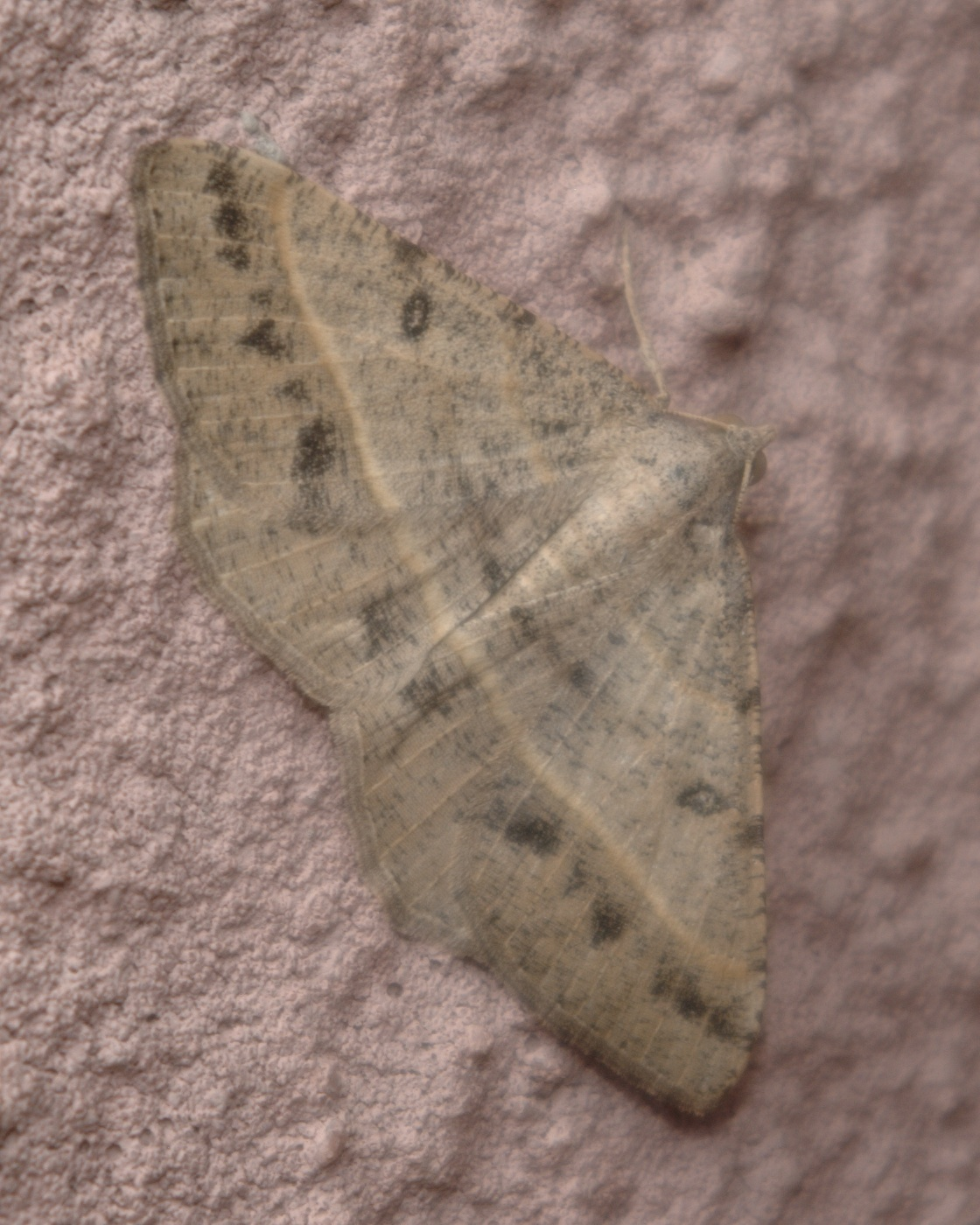

Scientific classification
- Domain: Eukaryota
- Kingdom: Animalia
- Phylum: Arthropoda
- Class: Insecta
- Order: Lepidoptera
- Family: Geometridae
- Genus: Digrammia
- Species: D. irrorata

Binomial name
- Digrammia irrorata (Packard, 1876)

Synonyms
- Phasiane irrorata Packard, 1876; Semiothisa irrorata

= Digrammia irrorata =

Species of moth

Digrammia irrorata is a moth of the family Geometridae first described by Alpheus Spring Packard in 1876. It is found in the western United States and south-western Canada (from Oklahoma to California, north to British Columbia and Alberta).

The wingspan is 23–26 mm. Adults are on wing from March to June in the northern part of the range. There are several generations in the south.

The larval food plant is unknown.

== Subspecies ==
- Digrammia irrorata irrorata
- Digrammia irrorata rubricata Ferguson, 2008 (California)
- Digrammia irrorata venosata (McDunnough, 1939)
