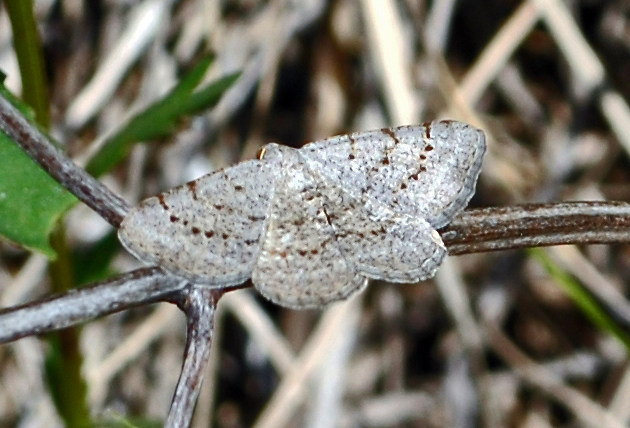

Scientific classification
- Domain: Eukaryota
- Kingdom: Animalia
- Phylum: Arthropoda
- Class: Insecta
- Order: Lepidoptera
- Family: Geometridae
- Genus: Digrammia
- Species: D. sublacteolata

Binomial name
- Digrammia sublacteolata (Hulst, 1887)

Synonyms
- Semiothisa sublacteolata Hulst, 1887

= Digrammia sublacteolata =

Species of moth

Digrammia sublacteolata is a species of geometrid moth in the family Geometridae.
