= Wax plant =

Wax plant may refer to:

- Hoya, a tropical climbing plants genus in the family Apocynaceae native to southern Asia, Australia and Polynesia
- Cynanchum elegans (white-flowered wax plant), a plant species found in New South Wales in Australia
- Euphorbia antisyphilitica (also called candelilla), a spurge species native to the Southern United States and Mexico

== See also ==
- Wax flower
