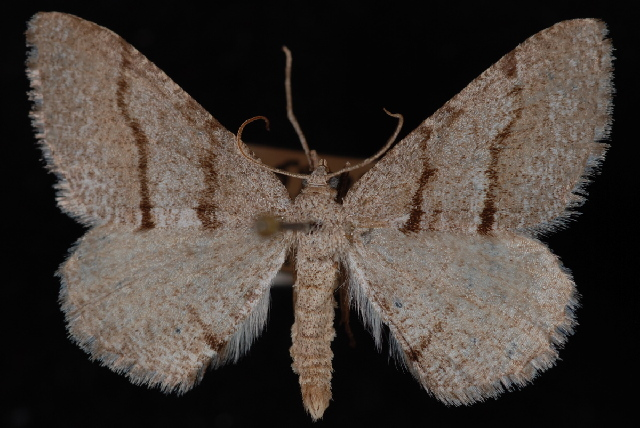

Scientific classification
- Kingdom: Animalia
- Phylum: Arthropoda
- Clade: Pancrustacea
- Class: Insecta
- Order: Lepidoptera
- Family: Geometridae
- Tribe: Macariini
- Genus: Digrammia
- Species: D. setonana

Binomial name
- Digrammia setonana (McDunnough, 1927)

Synonyms
- Phasiane setonana McDunnough, 1927

= Digrammia setonana =

Species of moth

Digrammia setonana is a species of geometrid moth in the family Geometridae. It is found in North America.
