= Digrammia terramalata =

Scientific classification
- Kingdom: Animalia
- Phylum: Arthropoda
- Clade: Pancrustacea
- Class: Insecta
- Order: Lepidoptera
- Family: Geometridae
- Tribe: Macariini
- Genus: Digrammia
- Species: D. terramalata

Binomial name
- Digrammia terramalata Ferguson, 2008

Species of moth

Digrammia terramalata is a species of geometrid moth in the family Geometridae. It is found in North America.
