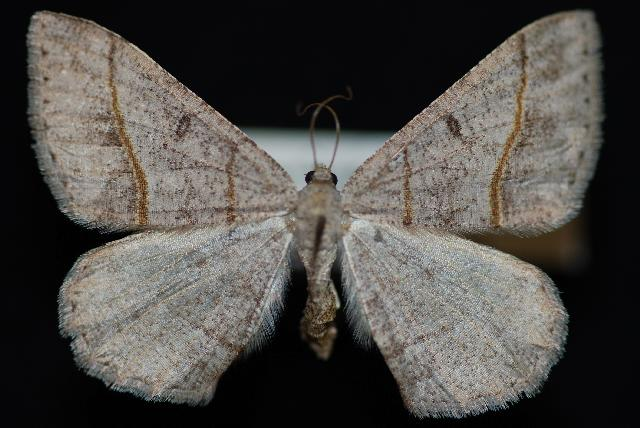

Scientific classification
- Kingdom: Animalia
- Phylum: Arthropoda
- Class: Insecta
- Order: Lepidoptera
- Family: Geometridae
- Tribe: Macariini
- Genus: Digrammia
- Species: D. neptaria

Binomial name
- Digrammia neptaria (Guenée in Boisduval & Guenée, 1858)

Synonyms
- Panagra flavofasciata Packard, 1871; Phasiane cinereata Bates, 1886; Phasiane sinuata Packard, 1874; Phasiane trifasciata Packard, 1874; Tephrina neptaria Guenée in Boisduval and Guenée, 1858

= Digrammia neptaria =

Species of moth

Digrammia neptaria, the dark-bordered granite, is a species of geometrid moth in the family Geometridae. It is found in Central America and North America.

The MONA or Hodges number for Digrammia neptaria is 6396.
