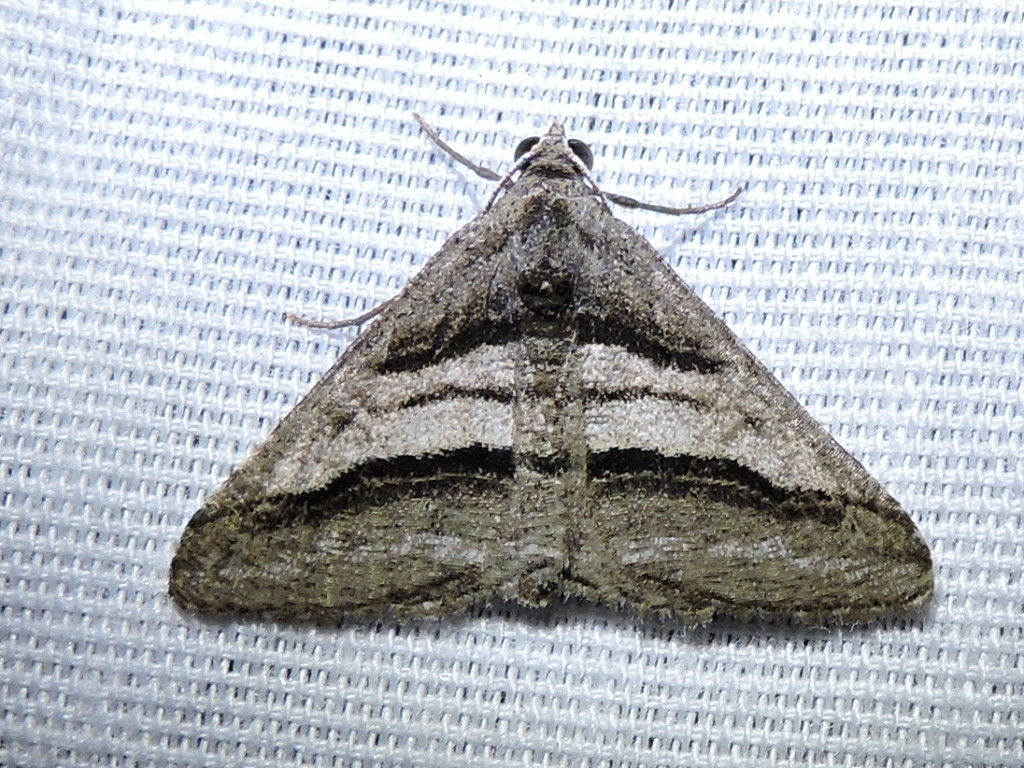

Scientific classification
- Kingdom: Animalia
- Phylum: Arthropoda
- Clade: Pancrustacea
- Class: Insecta
- Order: Lepidoptera
- Family: Geometridae
- Genus: Digrammia
- Species: D. atrofasciata

Binomial name
- Digrammia atrofasciata (Packard, 1876)

Synonyms
- Phasiane atrofasciata (Cassino, 1928); Phasiane nigroalbana Packard, 1876; Semiothisa nigroalbana Cassino, 1928

= Digrammia atrofasciata =

Species of moth

Digrammia atrofasciata is a species of geometrid moth in the family Geometridae. It was described by Alpheus Spring Packard in 1876 and is found in North America.

The MONA or Hodges number for Digrammia atrofasciata is 6368.
