= Digrammia pertinata =

Scientific classification
- Kingdom: Animalia
- Phylum: Arthropoda
- Clade: Pancrustacea
- Class: Insecta
- Order: Lepidoptera
- Family: Geometridae
- Genus: Digrammia
- Species: D. pertinata

Binomial name
- Digrammia pertinata (McDunnough, 1939)

Synonyms
- Semiothisa pertinata McDunnough, 1939

Species of moth

Digrammia pertinata is a species of geometrid moth in the family Geometridae. It is found in North America.

The MONA or Hodges number for Digrammia pertinata is 6365.
