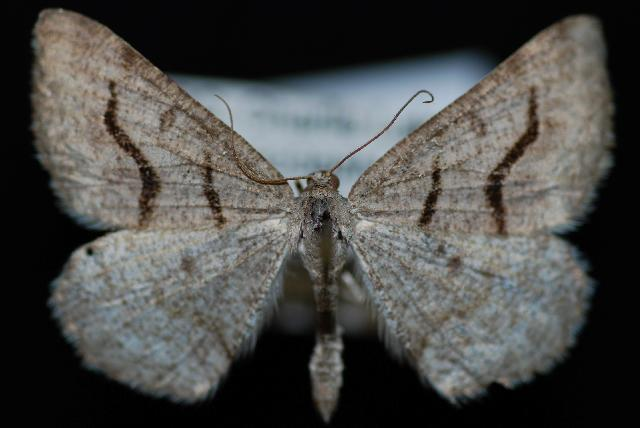

Scientific classification
- Kingdom: Animalia
- Phylum: Arthropoda
- Clade: Pancrustacea
- Class: Insecta
- Order: Lepidoptera
- Family: Geometridae
- Tribe: Macariini
- Genus: Digrammia
- Species: D. rippertaria

Binomial name
- Digrammia rippertaria (Duponchel in Godart & Duponchel, 1830)

= Digrammia rippertaria =

Species of moth

Digrammia rippertaria, the northern granite, is a species of geometrid moth in the family Geometridae. It is found in Europe and Northern Asia (excluding China) and North America.

== Subspecies ==
These two subspecies belong to the species Digrammia rippertaria:

- Digrammia rippertaria flavularia (Püngeler, 1902)
- Digrammia rippertaria rippertaria (Duponchel in Godart & Duponchel, 1830)
