= Digrammia indeterminata =

Scientific classification
- Kingdom: Animalia
- Phylum: Arthropoda
- Clade: Pancrustacea
- Class: Insecta
- Order: Lepidoptera
- Family: Geometridae
- Tribe: Macariini
- Genus: Digrammia
- Species: D. indeterminata

Binomial name
- Digrammia indeterminata (McDunnough, 1939)

Synonyms
- Semiothisa indeterminata McDunnough, 1939

Species of moth

Digrammia indeterminata is a species of geometrid moth in the family Geometridae.
