= Digrammia excurvata =

Scientific classification
- Kingdom: Animalia
- Phylum: Arthropoda
- Clade: Pancrustacea
- Class: Insecta
- Order: Lepidoptera
- Family: Geometridae
- Genus: Digrammia
- Species: D. excurvata

Binomial name
- Digrammia excurvata (Packard, 1874)

Synonyms
- Phasiane excurvata Packard, 1874; Sciagraphia spodopterata Hulst, 1898

Species of moth

Digrammia excurvata is a species of geometrid moth in the family Geometridae. It is found in North America.
