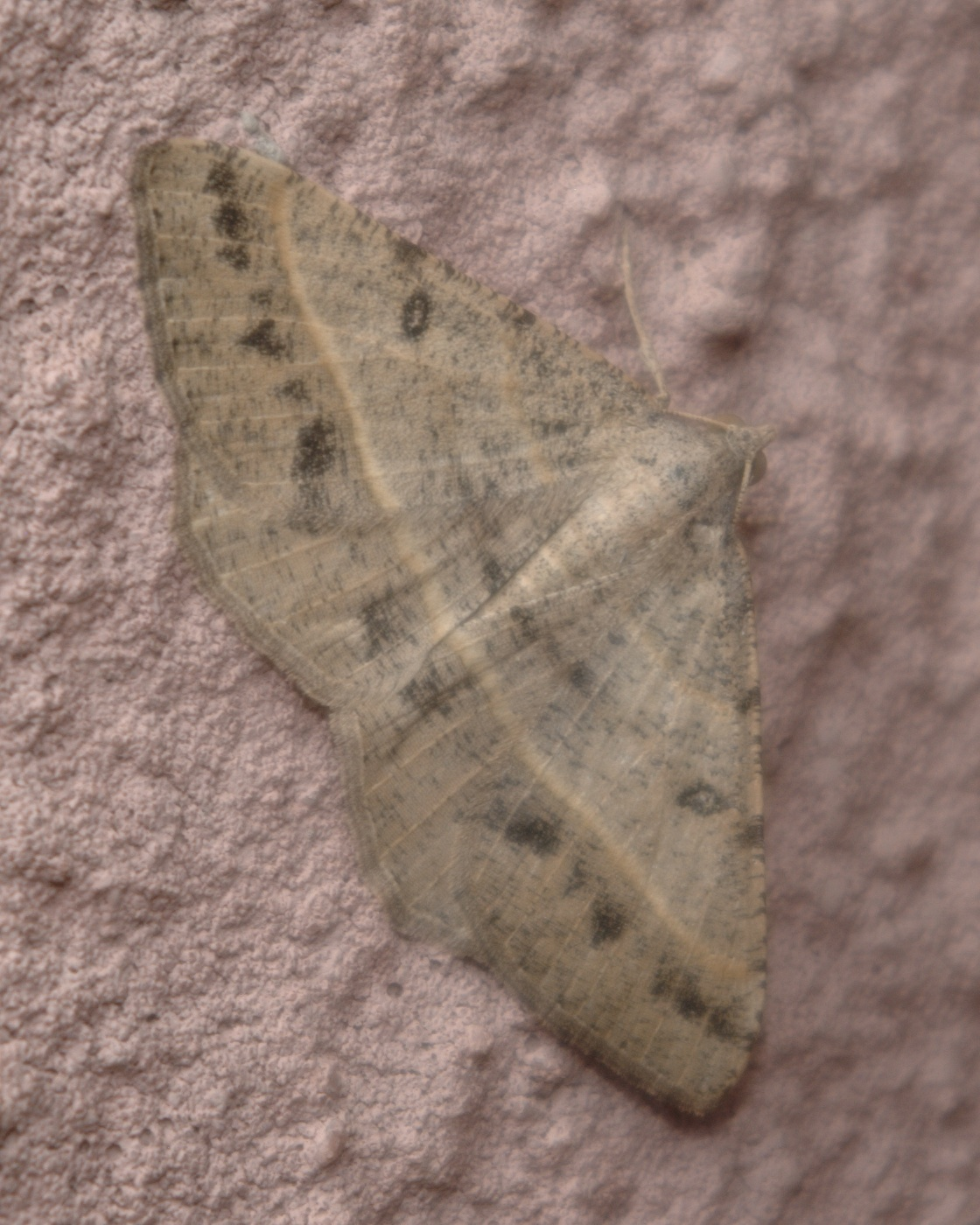
- D. irrorata

Scientific classification
- Domain: Eukaryota
- Kingdom: Animalia
- Phylum: Arthropoda
- Class: Insecta
- Order: Lepidoptera
- Family: Geometridae
- Tribe: Macariini
- Genus: Digrammia; Gumppenberg, 1887

Synonyms
- Asmate Gumppenberg, 1887; Spinuncina Wehrli, 1937

= Digrammia =

Genus of moths

Digrammia was a genus of moths in the family Geometridae erected by Carl Freiherr von Gumppenberg in 1887. It is now often considered a synonym of Semiothisa.

== Species ==
- Digrammia aliceata (Cassino, 1928)
- Digrammia atrofasciata (Packard, 1876)
- Digrammia burneyata (McDunnough, 1939)
- Digrammia californiaria (Packard, 1871) - Californian granite moth
- Digrammia cinereola (Hulst, 1896)
- Digrammia colorata (Grote, 1883) - creosote moth
- Digrammia continuata (Walker, 1862) - curve-lined angle moth
- Digrammia curvata (Grote, 1880)
- Digrammia decorata (Grossbeck, 1907) - decorated granite moth
- Digrammia delectata (Hulst, 1887)
- Digrammia denticulata (Grote, 1883)
- Digrammia equivocata Ferguson, 2008
- Digrammia eremiata (Guenée, 1857) - three-lined angle moth
- Digrammia excurvata (Packard, 1874)
- Digrammia extenuata Ferguson, 2008
- Digrammia fieldi (Swett, 1916)
- Digrammia gilletteata (Dyar, 1904)
- Digrammia gnophosaria (Guenée, 1857) - hollow-spotted angle moth
- Digrammia hebetata (Hulst, 1881)
- Digrammia imparilata Ferguson, 2008
- Digrammia indeterminata (McDunnough, 1939)
- Digrammia irrorata (Packard, 1876)
- Digrammia mellistrigata (Grote, 1873) - yellow-lined angle moth
- Digrammia minuta (Hulst, 1896)
- Digrammia modocata Ferguson, 2008
- Digrammia muscariata (Guenée, 1857)
- Digrammia napensis (McDunnough, 1939)
- Digrammia neptaria (Guenée, 1857) - dark-bordered granite moth
- Digrammia nubiculata (Packard, 1876)
- Digrammia ocellinata (Guenée, 1857) - faint-spotted angle moth
- Digrammia ordinata (Walker, 1862)
- Digrammia pallidata (Packard, 1873)
- Digrammia pallorata Ferguson, 2008
- Digrammia palodurata Ferguson, 2008
- Digrammia pertinata (McDunnough, 1939)
- Digrammia pervolata (Hulst, 1880)
- Digrammia pictipennata (Hulst, 1898)
- Digrammia plemmelata Ferguson, 2008
- Digrammia puertata (Grossbeck, 1912)
- Digrammia rippertaria (Duponchel, 1830)
- Digrammia setonana (McDunnough, 1927)
- Digrammia sexpunctata (Bates, 1886) - six-spotted angle moth
- Digrammia spinata (McDunnough, 1939)
- Digrammia sublacteolata (Hulst, 1887)
- Digrammia subminiata (Packard, 1873)
- Digrammia terramalata Ferguson, 2008
- Digrammia triviata (Barnes & McDunnough, 1917)
- Digrammia ubiquitata Ferguson, 2008
- Digrammia yavapai (Grossbeck, 1907)
