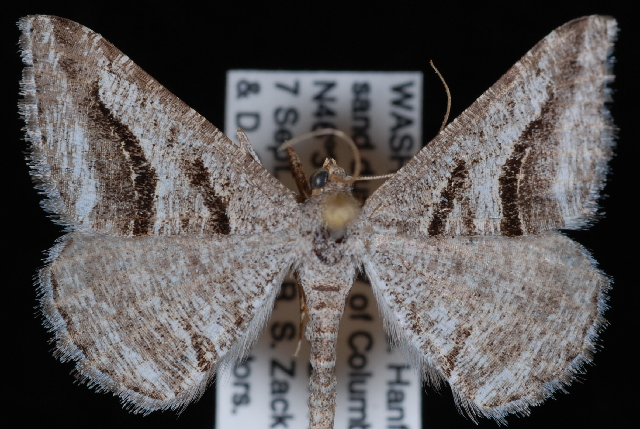

Scientific classification
- Kingdom: Animalia
- Phylum: Arthropoda
- Class: Insecta
- Order: Lepidoptera
- Family: Geometridae
- Genus: Digrammia
- Species: D. curvata

Binomial name
- Digrammia curvata (Grote, 1880)

Synonyms
- Phasiane cruciata Grote, 1880; Phasiane curvata Grote, 1883

= Digrammia curvata =

Species of moth

Digrammia curvata, the shaded granite, is a species of geometrid moth in the family Geometridae. It is found in Central America and North America.

The MONA number for Digrammia curvata is 910784 & Hodges number for Digrammia curvata is 6370.
