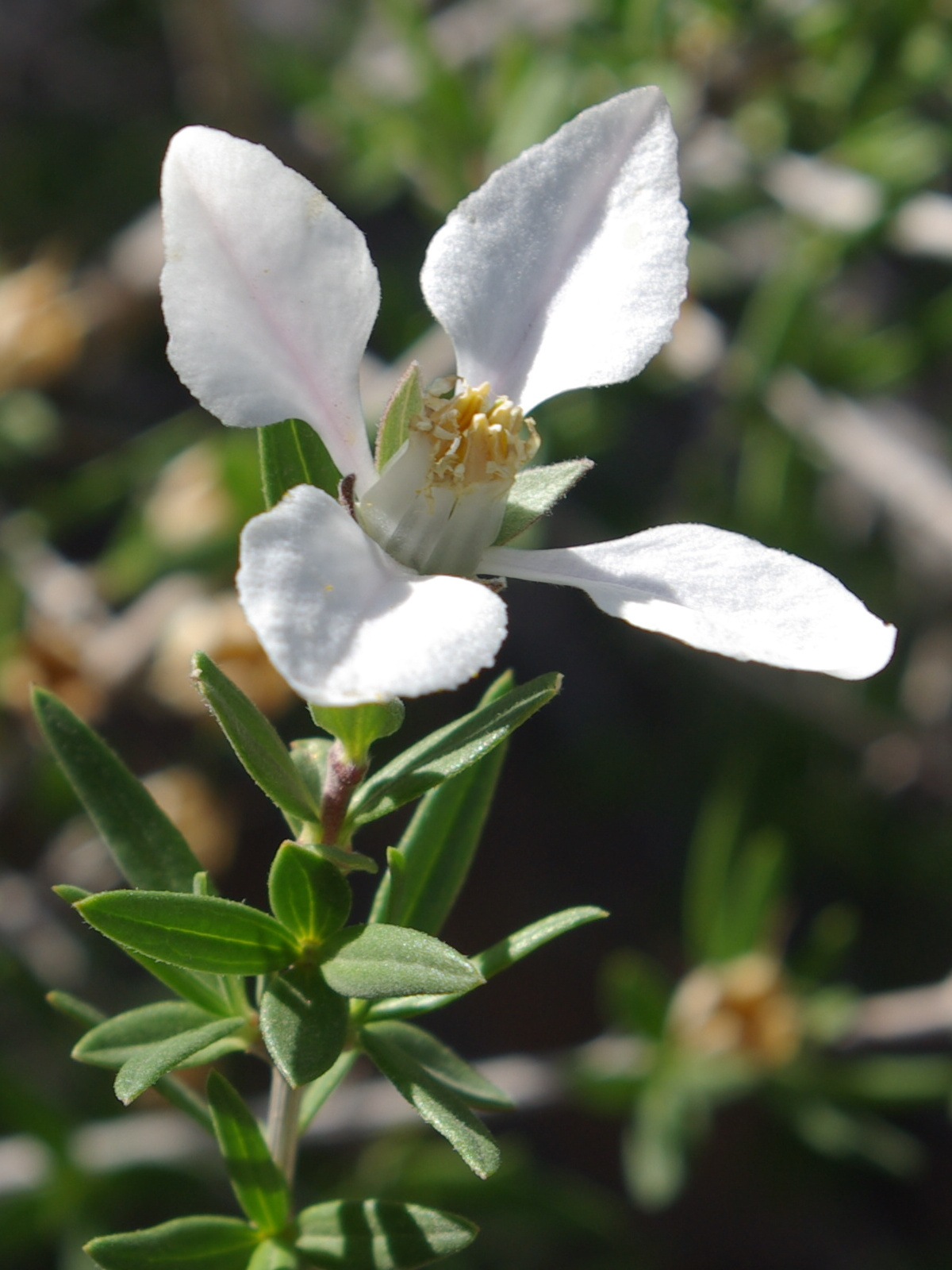
- Fendlera rupicola

Scientific classification
- Kingdom: Plantae
- Clade: Tracheophytes
- Clade: Angiosperms
- Clade: Eudicots
- Clade: Asterids
- Order: Cornales
- Family: Hydrangeaceae
- Subfamily: Jamesioideae
- Genus: Fendlera; Engelm. & Gray

Type species
- Fendlera rupicola Engelm. & A. Gray

Species
- Fendlera rigida - Stiff fendlerbush Fendlera rupicola - Cliff fendlerbush Fendlera wrightii - Wright fendlerbush

= Fendlera =

Genus of plants

Fendlera is a genus of shrubs in the Hydrangeaceae. They are most commonly known as fendlerbush. The name fendlerbush is also used for the closely related genus Fendlerella.

== Etymology ==
The genus was named for Augustus Fendler in 1852.
