= Digrammia equivocata =

Scientific classification
- Kingdom: Animalia
- Phylum: Arthropoda
- Class: Insecta
- Order: Lepidoptera
- Family: Geometridae
- Genus: Digrammia
- Species: D. equivocata

Binomial name
- Digrammia equivocata Ferguson, 2008

Species of moth

Digrammia equivocata, the equivocal looper, is a species of moth native to North America. It is listed as historic in the US state of Massachusetts, and as a species of special concern in Connecticut. The larval host plant is Tephrosia virginiana. It was described by Douglas C. Ferguson in 2008.
