= Digrammia californiaria =

Scientific classification
- Kingdom: Animalia
- Phylum: Arthropoda
- Clade: Pancrustacea
- Class: Insecta
- Order: Lepidoptera
- Family: Geometridae
- Genus: Digrammia
- Species: D. californiaria

Binomial name
- Digrammia californiaria (Packard, 1871)

Synonyms
- Macaria californiaria Packard, 1871

Species of moth

Digrammia californiaria, the Californian granite, is a species of geometrid moth in the family Geometridae. It is found in North America.

The MONA or Hodges number for Digrammia californiaria is 6380.
