= Digrammia imparilata =

Scientific classification
- Domain: Eukaryota
- Kingdom: Animalia
- Phylum: Arthropoda
- Class: Insecta
- Order: Lepidoptera
- Family: Geometridae
- Tribe: Macariini
- Genus: Digrammia
- Species: D. imparilata

Binomial name
- Digrammia imparilata Ferguson, 2008

Species of moth

Digrammia imparilata is a species of geometrid moth in the family Geometridae. It is found in North America.

The MONA or Hodges number for Digrammia imparilata is 6366.1.
