= Digrammia burneyata =

Scientific classification
- Kingdom: Animalia
- Phylum: Arthropoda
- Class: Insecta
- Order: Lepidoptera
- Family: Geometridae
- Tribe: Macariini
- Genus: Digrammia
- Species: D. burneyata

Binomial name
- Digrammia burneyata (McDunnough, 1939)

Synonyms
- Semiothisa burneyata McDunnough, 1939

Species of moth

Digrammia burneyata is a species of geometrid moth in the family Geometridae.

The MONA or Hodges number for Digrammia burneyata is 6376.
