= Digrammia cinereola =

Scientific classification
- Domain: Eukaryota
- Kingdom: Animalia
- Phylum: Arthropoda
- Class: Insecta
- Order: Lepidoptera
- Family: Geometridae
- Genus: Digrammia
- Species: D. cinereola

Binomial name
- Digrammia cinereola (Hulst, 1896)

Species of moth

Digrammia cinereola is a species of moth in the family Geometridae first described by George Duryea Hulst in 1896. It is found in North America.

The MONA or Hodges number for Digrammia cinereola is 6363.2.

== Subspecies ==
Two subspecies belong to Digrammia cinereola:

- Digrammia cinereola cinereola (Hulst, 1896)^{i g}
- Digrammia cinereola septemberata (Barnes & McDunnough, 1917)^{i g}

Data sources: i = ITIS, c = Catalogue of Life, g = GBIF, b = BugGuide
