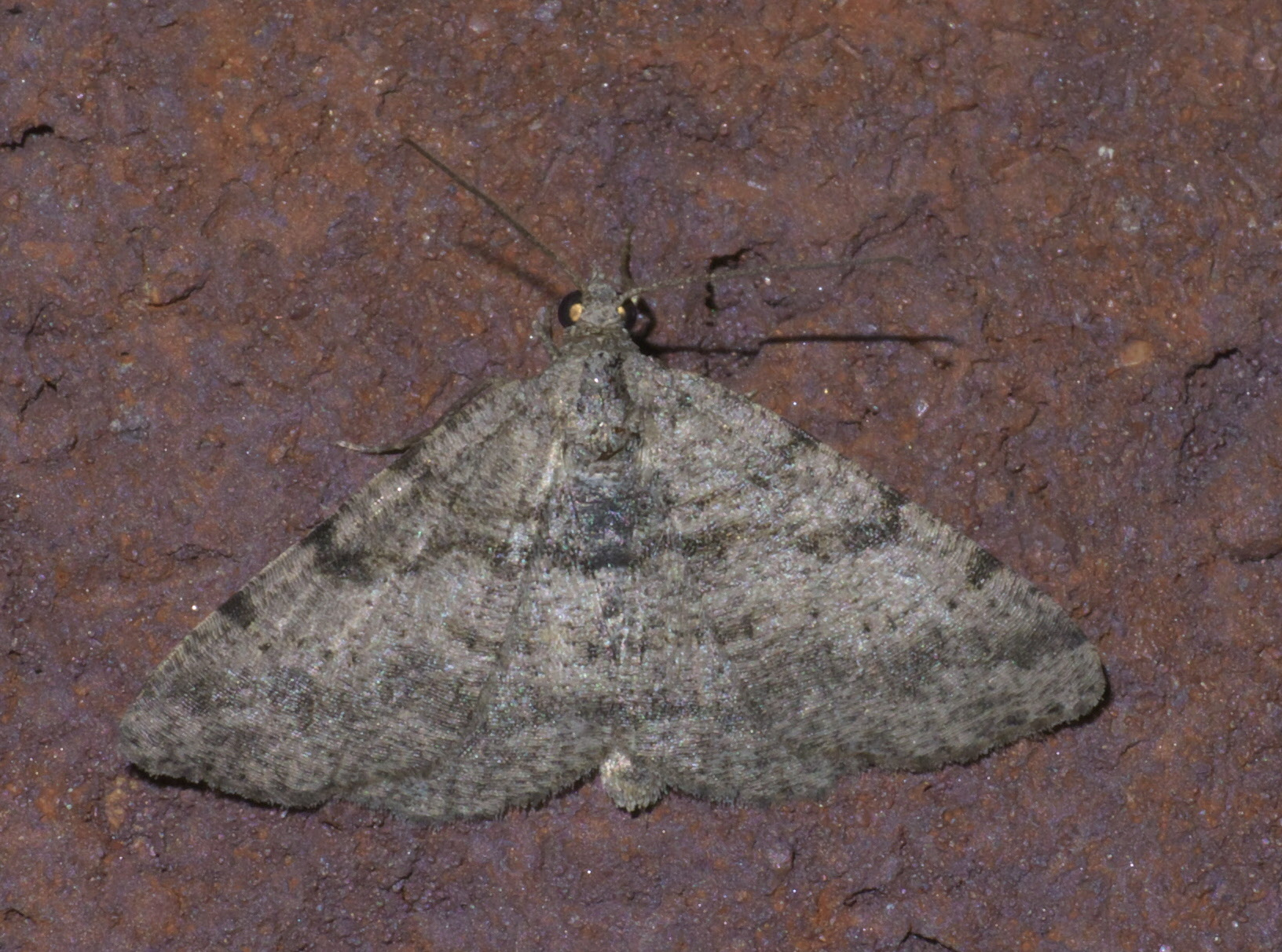

Scientific classification
- Kingdom: Animalia
- Phylum: Arthropoda
- Class: Insecta
- Order: Lepidoptera
- Family: Geometridae
- Genus: Digrammia
- Species: D. gnophosaria

Binomial name
- Digrammia gnophosaria (Guenée, 1857)

Synonyms
- Tephrina gnophosaria Guenée, 1857; Camptogramma infectata Walker, 1862; Macaria reductaria Walker, [1863]; Semiothisa caesiaria Hulst, 1888; Macaria da Dyar, 1916; Semiothisa gnophosaria

= Digrammia gnophosaria =

Hollow-spotted angle

Species of moth

Digrammia gnophosaria, the hollow-spotted angle, is a species of moth of the family Geometridae. It is found in Illinois, Louisiana, Minnesota, New Jersey, North Carolina, Oklahoma, Texas and Wisconsin.

The larvae feed on Salix species, including Salix babylonica.
