= Digrammia pervolata =

Scientific classification
- Domain: Eukaryota
- Kingdom: Animalia
- Phylum: Arthropoda
- Class: Insecta
- Order: Lepidoptera
- Family: Geometridae
- Genus: Digrammia
- Species: D. pervolata

Binomial name
- Digrammia pervolata (Hulst, 1880)

Synonyms
- Phasiane davisata Cassino, 1928; Semiothisa davisata (Cassino, 1928); Thamnonoma pervolata Hulst, 1880

Species of moth

Digrammia pervolata is a species of geometrid moth in the family Geometridae. It is found in Central America and North America.

The MONA or Hodges number for Digrammia pervolata is 6383.
