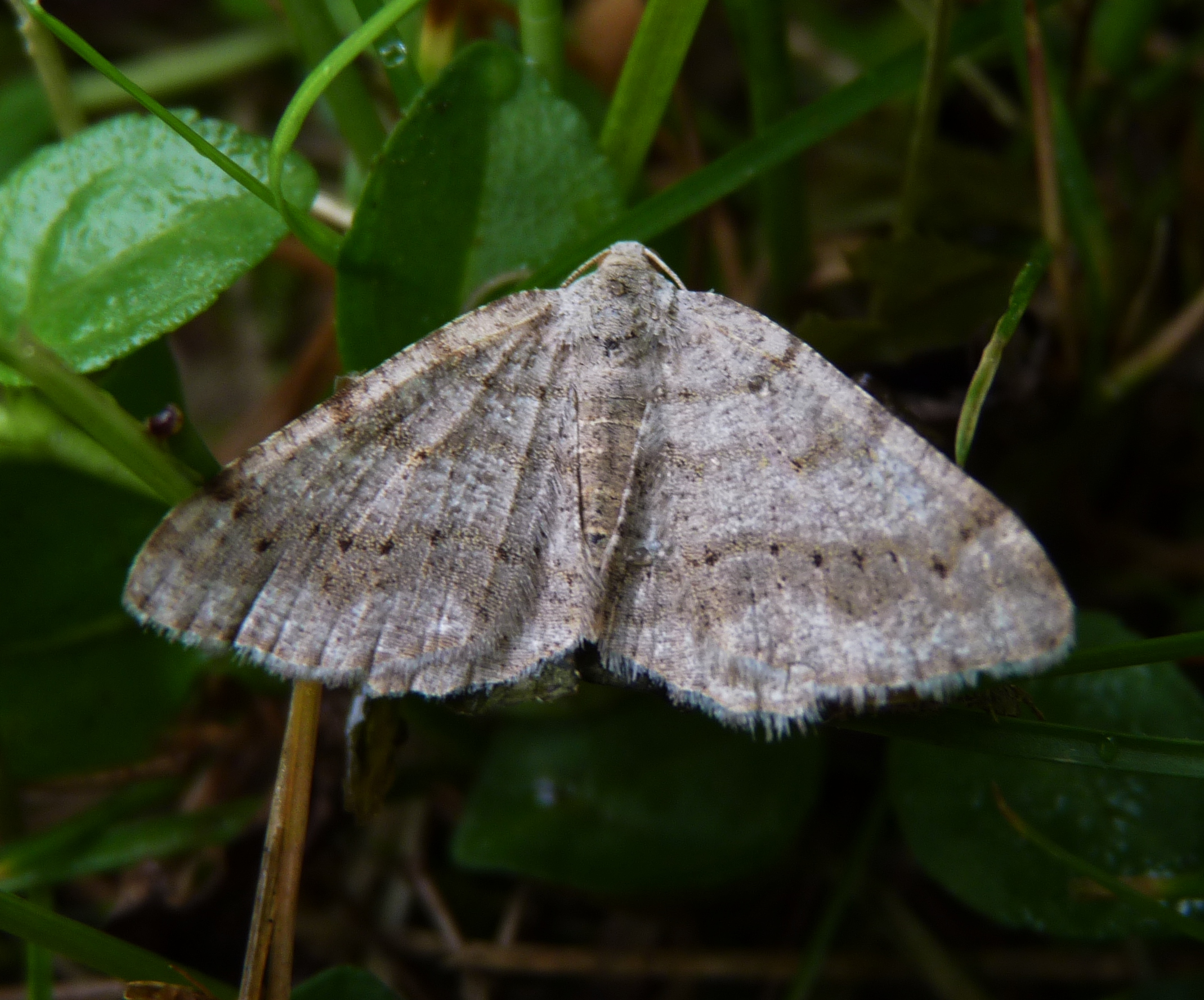

Scientific classification
- Kingdom: Animalia
- Phylum: Arthropoda
- Class: Insecta
- Order: Lepidoptera
- Family: Geometridae
- Genus: Digrammia
- Species: D. ocellinata

Binomial name
- Digrammia ocellinata (Guenée, 1857)

Synonyms
- Macaria ocellinata Guenée, 1857; Macaria duplicata Packard, 1873; Semiothisa ocellinata

= Digrammia ocellinata =

Species of moth

Digrammia ocellinata, the faint-spotted angle or locust looper, is a moth of the family Geometridae. The species was first described by Achille Guenée in 1857. It is found in the eastern United States, Quebec and Ontario.

The wingspan is 21-27 mm.

Adults are on wing from April to October.

The larvae feed on the leaves of Robinia pseudoacacia and Gleditsia triacanthos.
