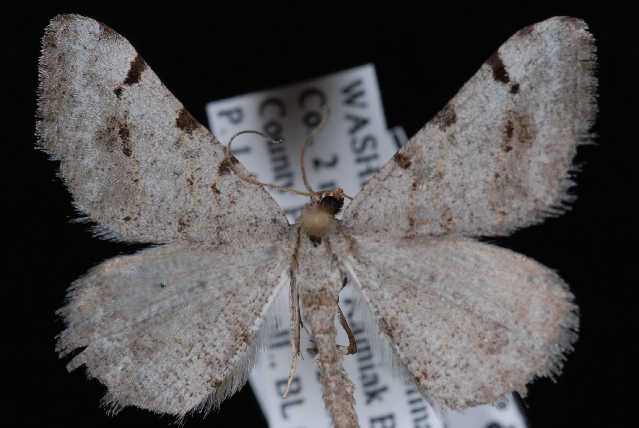

Scientific classification
- Domain: Eukaryota
- Kingdom: Animalia
- Phylum: Arthropoda
- Class: Insecta
- Order: Lepidoptera
- Family: Geometridae
- Genus: Digrammia
- Species: D. delectata

Binomial name
- Digrammia delectata (Hulst, 1887)

Synonyms
- Semiothisa delectata Hulst, 1887

= Digrammia delectata =

Species of moth

Digrammia delectata is a species of geometrid moth in the family Geometridae.

The MONA or Hodges number for Digrammia delectata is 6374.
