= Jamesia tetrapetala =

Conservation status
- Imperiled (NatureServe)

Scientific classification
- Kingdom: Plantae
- Clade: Embryophytes
- Clade: Tracheophytes
- Clade: Spermatophytes
- Clade: Angiosperms
- Clade: Eudicots
- Clade: Asterids
- Order: Cornales
- Family: Hydrangeaceae
- Genus: Jamesia
- Species: J. tetrapetala

Binomial name
- Jamesia tetrapetala N.H.Holmgren & P.K.Holmgren

Species of flowering plant

Jamesia tetrapetala, commonly known as four-petal cliffbush, is a species of flowering plant in the family Hydrangeaceae. It is a shrub native to the Great Basin of Nevada and Utah, where it grows in the Grant, Highland, and Snake ranges of eastern Nevada and the House Range of western Utah from 2000 to 3300 meters elevation. It blooms white or pink in June, July, and August. It grows on limestone cliffs, crevices, and talus slopes.

The species was described by Noel Herman Holmgren and Patricia Kern Holmgren in 1989.
