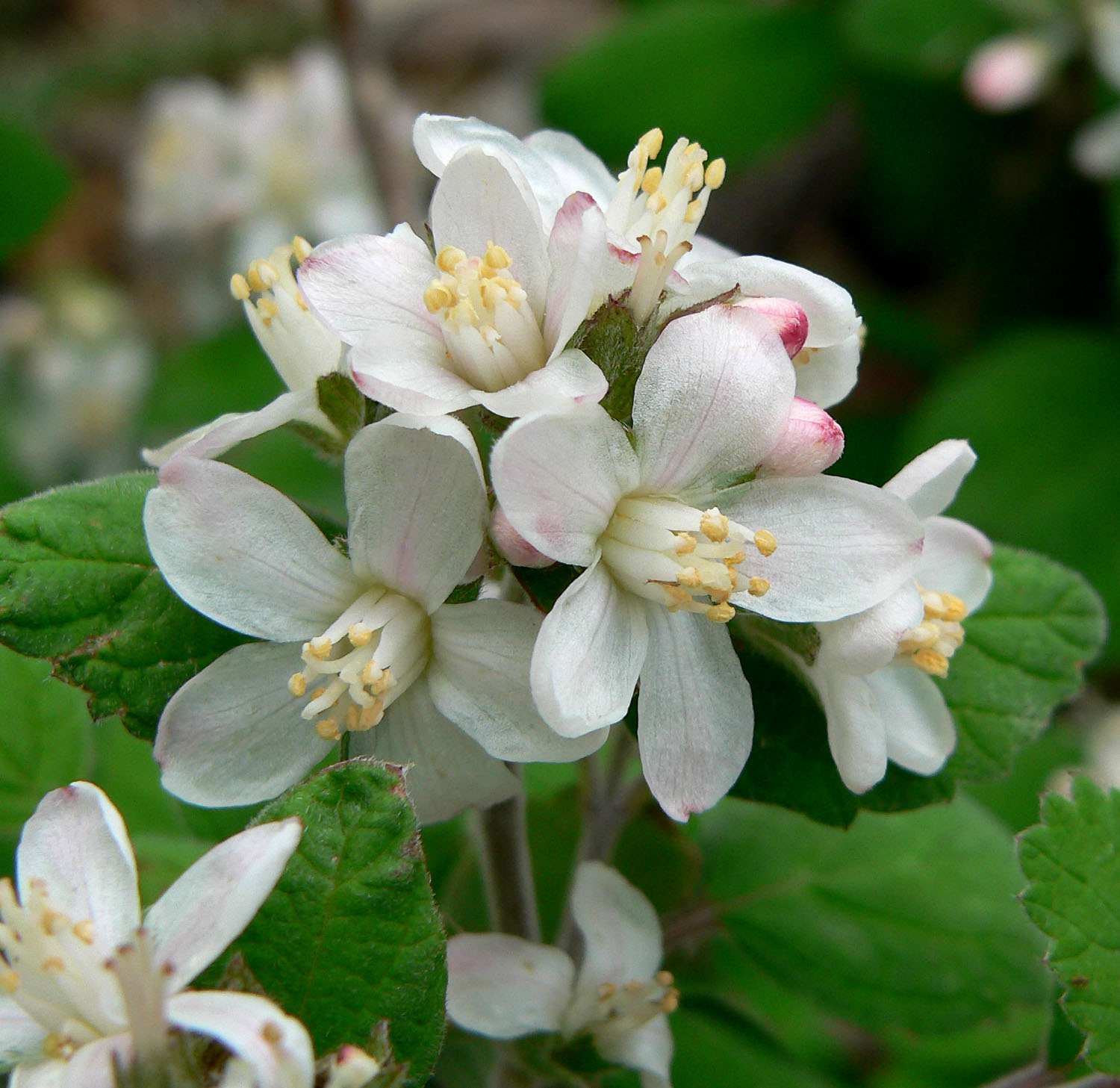
- Jamesia americana in flower

Scientific classification
- Kingdom: Plantae
- Clade: Tracheophytes
- Clade: Angiosperms
- Clade: Eudicots
- Clade: Asterids
- Order: Cornales
- Family: Hydrangeaceae
- Subfamily: Jamesioideae
- Genus: Jamesia; Torr. & A.Gray

Type species
- Jamesia americana Torr. & A.Gray

Species
- Jamesia americana Torr. & A.Gray; Jamesia tetrapetala N.H.Holmgren & P.K.Holmgren

Synonyms
- Edwinia A.Heller

= Jamesia =

Genus of shrubs

Jamesia is a genus of shrubs in the Hydrangeaceae, most commonly known as Jamesia, cliffbush or waxflower. It is native to interior western North America, in the U.S. states of Arizona, California, Colorado, Nevada, New Mexico, Utah, and Wyoming and in northeastern Mexico, where it grows in mountains at 1,600–3,000 m elevation.

Modern species are characterized by grey or reddish-brown bark and five-petaled flowers in white or pink.

== Taxonomy ==
=== Publication ===
The genus Jamesia was described by John Torrey and Asa Gray in 1840.

=== Species ===
The following species are accepted:

- Jamesia americana Torr. & A.Gray
- Jamesia tetrapetala N.H.Holmgren & P.K.Holmgren

== Description ==
It is a shrub growing to 1–2 m tall and to 3 m or more broad, with opposite simple leaves 3–7 cm long and 2–5 cm broad, with a serrated margin and a crinkled surface. The flowers are produced in erect terminal panicles, each flower white, 15–20 mm diameter, with five (rarely four) petals. The fruit is a dry capsule with numerous small seeds.

== Etymology ==
The genus is named in honor of Edwin James, the botanist on Stephen Long's expedition in 1820 that explored the territory between the Platte and Arkansas Rivers. James was the first to collect this genus for botanical study.
