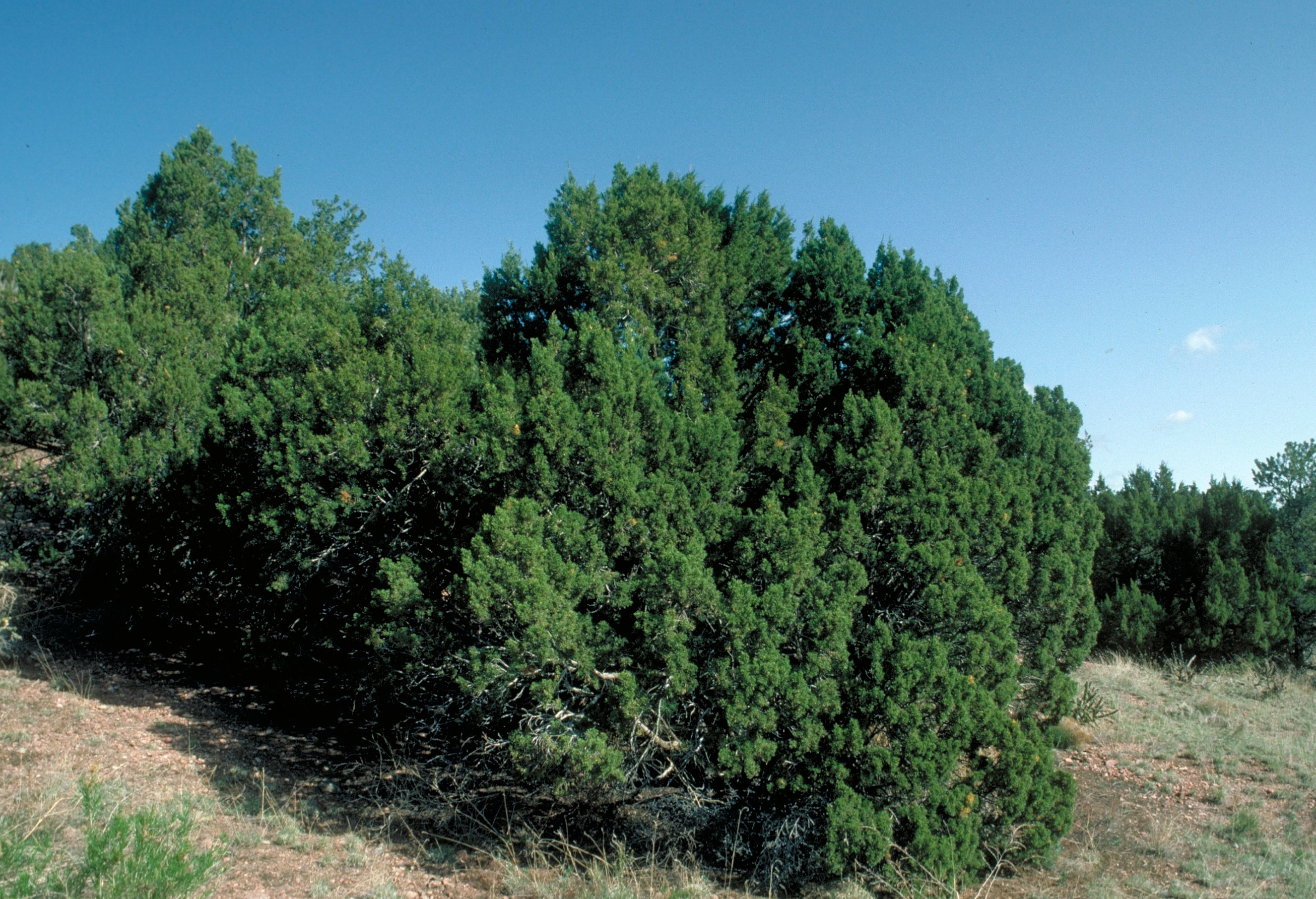

Conservation status
- Least Concern (IUCN 3.1)

- Apparently Secure (NatureServe)

Scientific classification
- Kingdom: Plantae
- Clade: Embryophytes
- Clade: Tracheophytes
- Clade: Spermatophytes
- Clade: Gymnospermae
- Division: Pinophyta
- Class: Pinopsida
- Order: Cupressales
- Family: Cupressaceae
- Genus: Juniperus
- Species: J. monosperma

Binomial name
- Juniperus monosperma (Engelm.) Sarg.
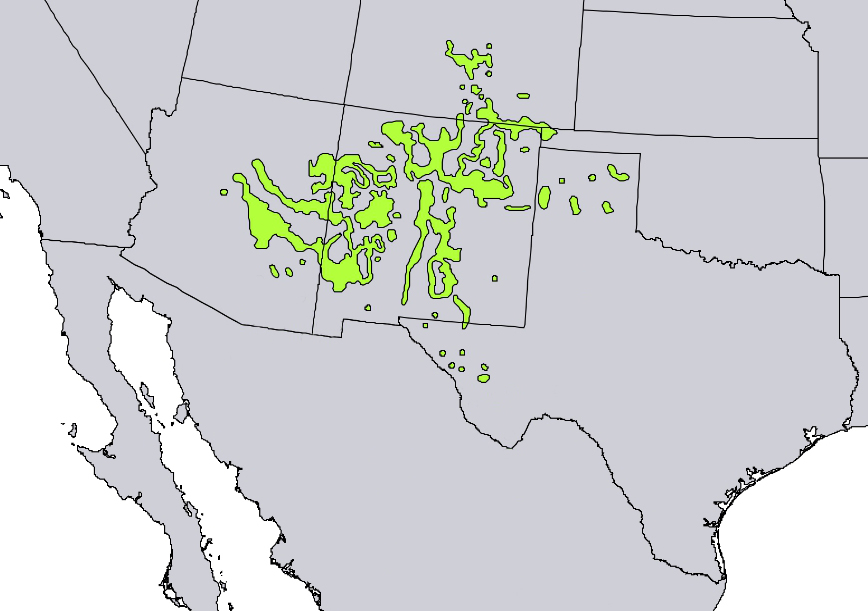
- Natural range

= Juniperus monosperma =

Species of conifer

Juniperus monosperma, the New Mexico juniper or one-seed juniper, is a species of juniper native to western North America, in the United States in Arizona, New Mexico, southern Colorado, western Oklahoma (Panhandle), and western Texas, and in Mexico in the extreme north of Chihuahua. It grows at 970–2300 m elevation.

The New Mexico juniper is an evergreen coniferous shrub or small tree growing to 2–7 metres (6 1/2–23 feet) (rarely to 12 m) tall, usually multistemmed, and with a dense, rounded crown. The bark is gray-brown, exfoliating in thin longitudinal strips, exposing bright orange brown underneath. The ultimate shoots are 1.2–1.9 millimetres thick. The leaves are scale-like, 1–2 mm long and 0.6–1.5 mm broad on small shoots, up to 10 mm long on vigorous shoots; they are arranged in alternating whorls of three or opposite pairs. The juvenile leaves, produced on young seedlings only, are needle-like. The cones are berry-like, with soft resinous flesh, subglobose to ovoid, 5–7 mm long, dark blue with a pale blue-white waxy bloom, and contain a single seed (rarely two or three); they mature in about 6–8 months from pollination, and are eaten by birds and mammals. The male cones are 2–4 mm long, and shed their pollen in late winter. It is usually dioecious, with male and female cones on separate plants, but occasional monoecious plants can be found. Its roots have been found to extend to as far as 61m below the surface, making it the plant with the second deepest roots, after Boscia albitrunca.

Frequently, New Mexico juniper cones can be found with the seed apex exposed; these were formerly sometimes considered a separate species as Juniperus gymnocarpa, but this is now known to be due to insect damage to the developing cones (and can affect many different species of juniper); the seeds from such cones are sterile.

It is very rare or even extinct in Mexico, with only a single herbarium collection from 1880 verified; more recent searches have failed to find the species there. A closely related species Juniperus angosturana was however formerly considered a variety, as J. monosperma var. gracilis Martínez; it differs from J. monosperma in its slenderer shoots 1.0–1.3 mm diameter.

Other vernacular names occasionally used include single-seed juniper and cherrystone juniper.

== Ecology ==
Hopi chipmunks, quail, foxes, rock squirrels and deer eat the berrylike cones. New Mexico's goats browse the foliage.

== Uses ==
Historically, the Navajo ate the ripened cones of New Mexico junipers in the fall or winter and made a dye from the bark and cones. They used its wood for various purposes. Among the Zuni people, a poultice of the chewed root was applied to increase the strength of newborns and infants. An infusion of the leaves was also taken for muscle aches and to prevent conception. An infusion of the leaves was also taken postpartum to prevent uterine cramps and stop vaginal bleeding. A simple or compound infusion of twigs was used to promote muscular contractions at birth and used after birth to stop blood flow. The wood was also used as a favorite and ceremonial firewood, and the shredded, fibrous bark was specifically used as tinder to ignite the fire sticks used for the New Year fire.
