= Hedgelaying =

Fencing with live plants

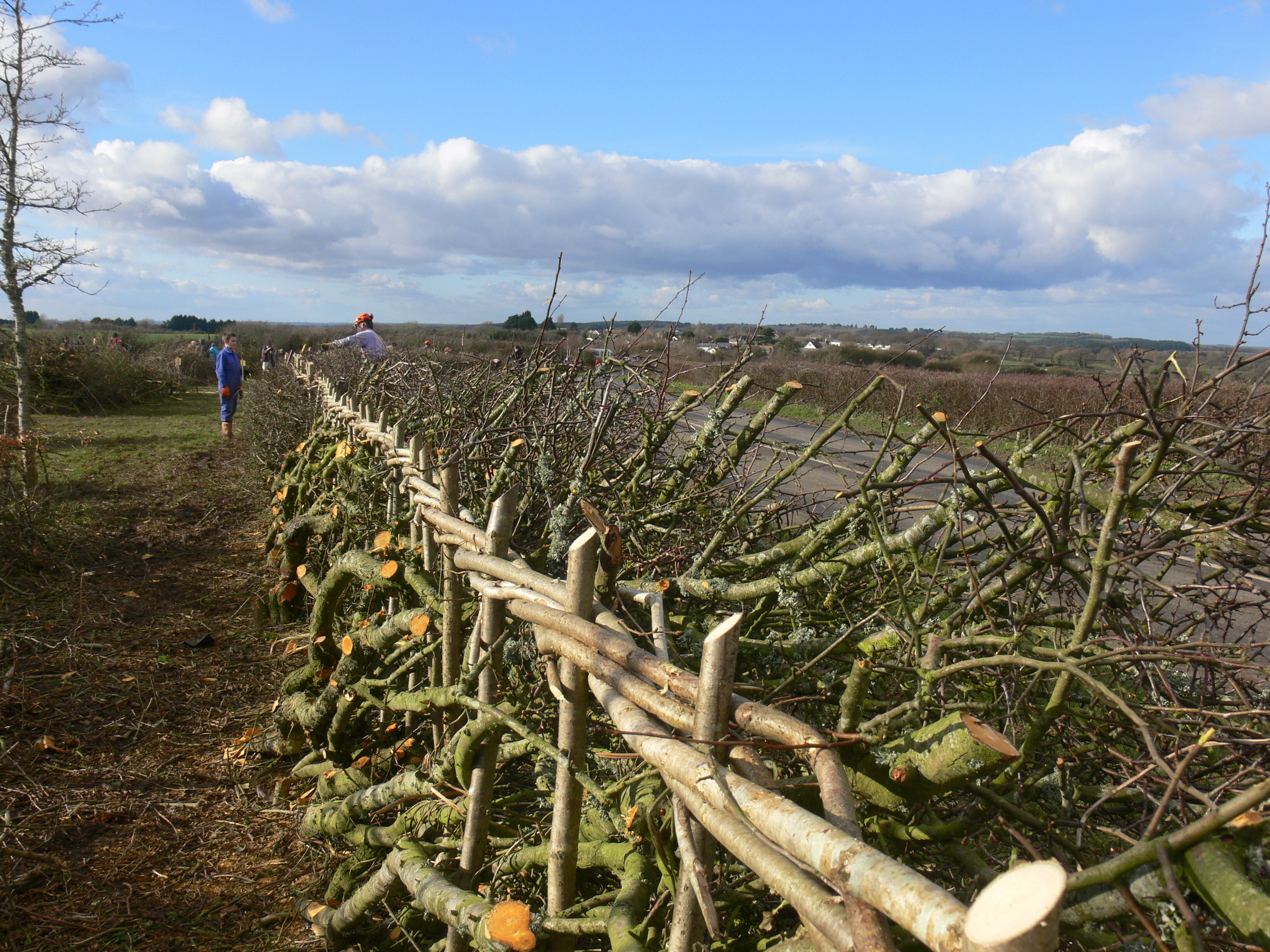
Hedge laid in Midland style

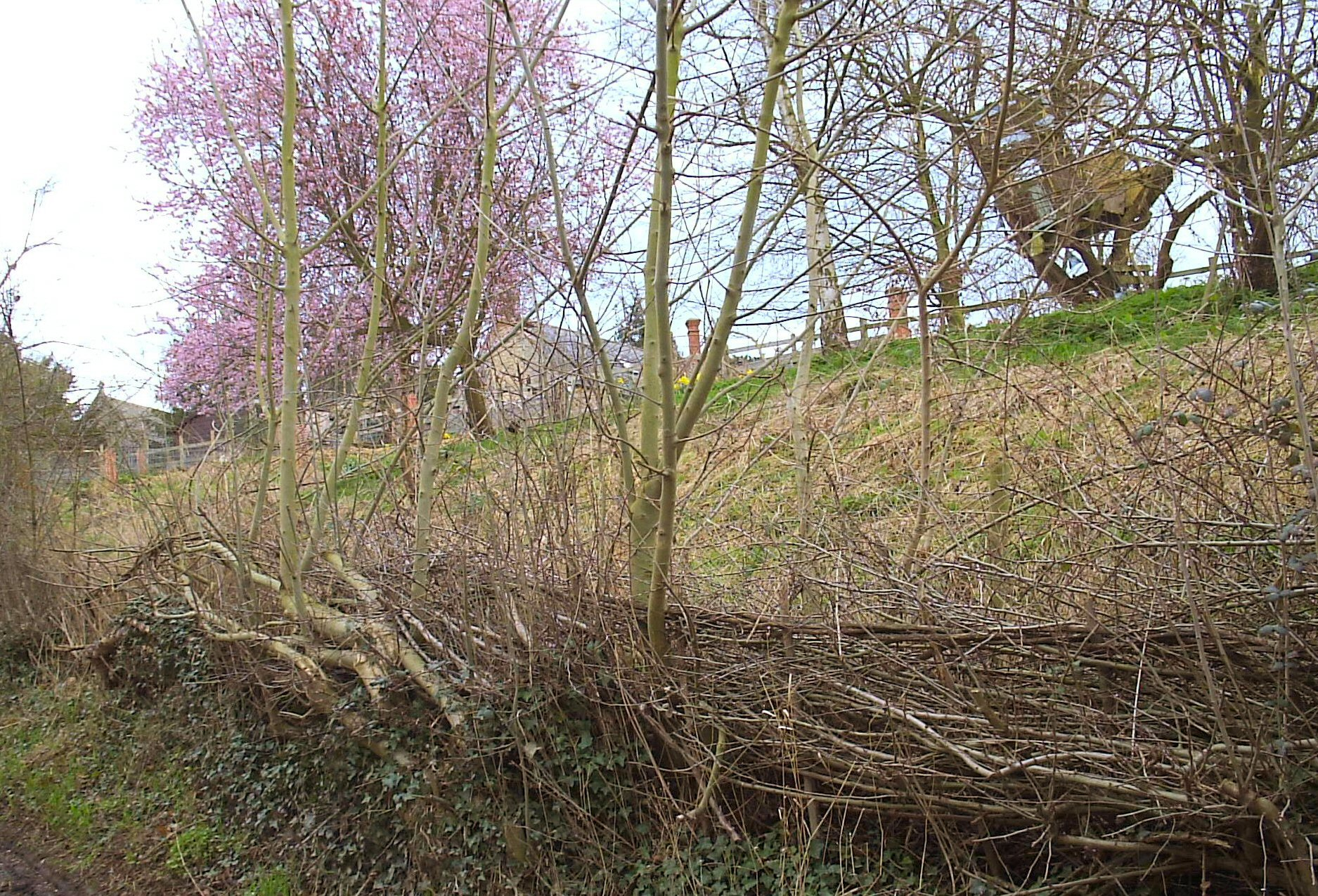
A hedge about three years after being re-laid

Hedgelaying or hedge laying is the process of partially cutting through and then bending the stems of a line of shrubs or small trees, near ground level, without breaking them, so as to encourage them to produce new growth from the base and create a living 'stock proof fence'. It is a countryside skill that has been practised for centuries, mainly in the United Kingdom and Ireland, with many regional variations in style and technique.

The first description of hedgelaying is in Julius Caesar's Commentaries on the Gallic War, when his army was inconvenienced by thick woven hedges during the Battle of the Sabis in Belgium. Hedgelaying developed as a way of containing livestock in fields, particularly after the acts of enclosure which, in England, began in the 16th century.

Today hedges are laid to contain livestock without the need for artificial fences. They have the added benefits of maintaining biodiversity-friendly habitats and promoting traditional skills.

== Benefits ==
Creating and maintaining hedges provides:

- livestock-proof barriers;
- habitat for many species of wildlife
- rejuvenation of existing hedgerows by encouraging them to put on new growth, and thus helping to improve their overall structure and strength;
- control of flood risk, improvement in water quality and reduction in soil erosion;
- weather protection for crops and wildlife; and
- aesthetically pleasing screens to fields and gardens.

== Theory and practice ==
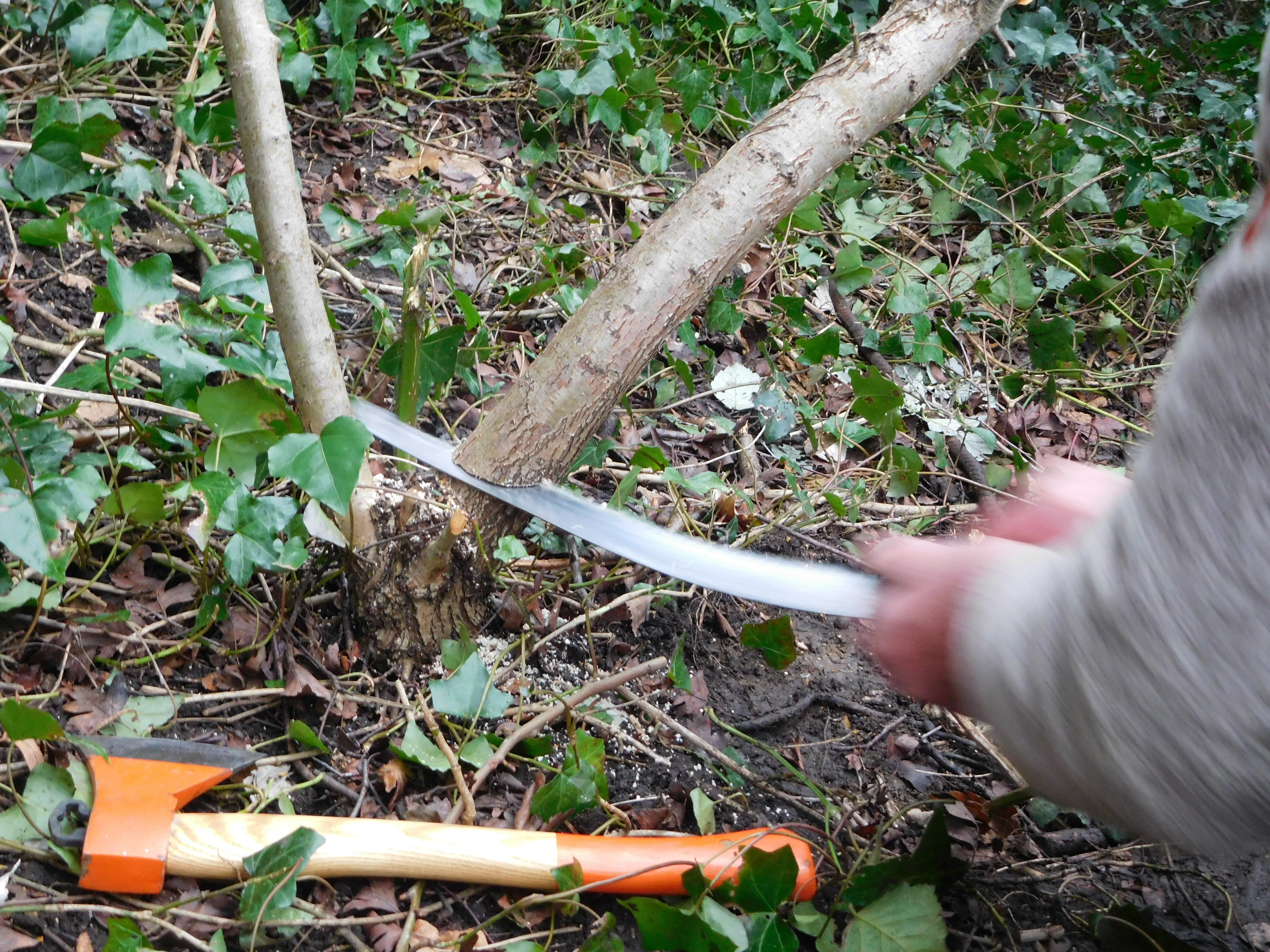
Starting the pleacher with a pruning saw

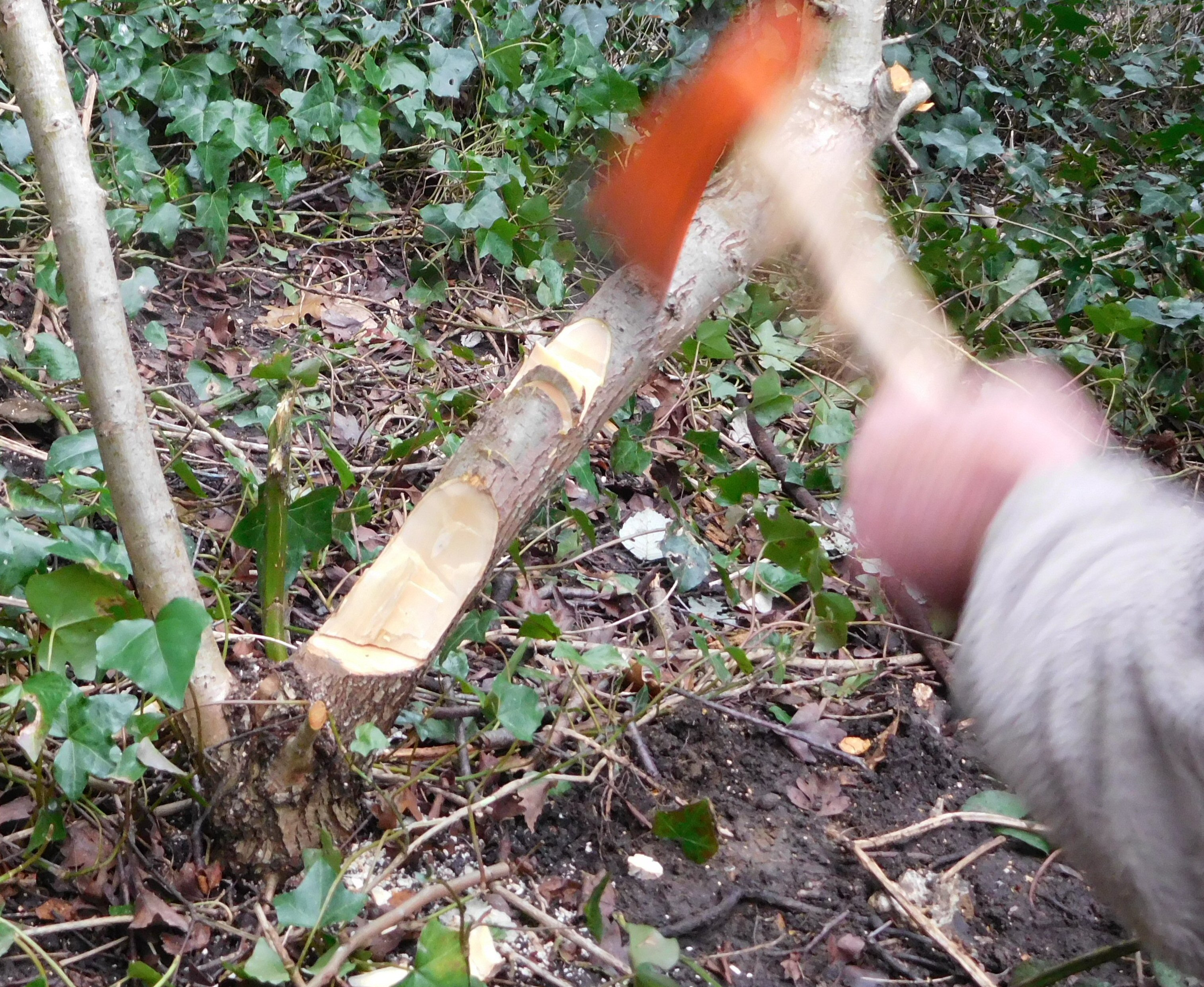
Cutting the pleacher with an axe, enabling the stem to be laid and continue to grow in a hedge

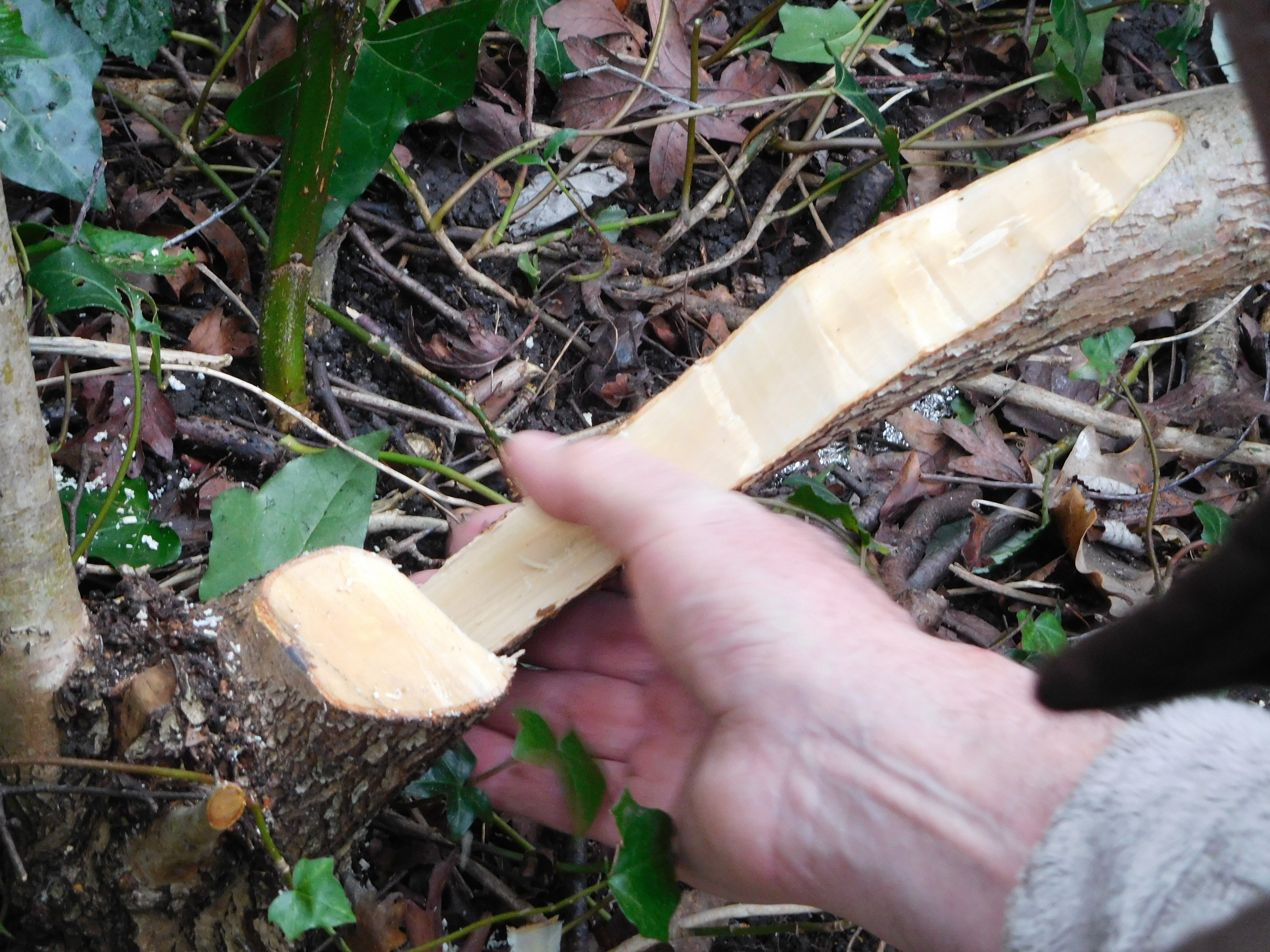
Laying the pleacher, a crucial stage

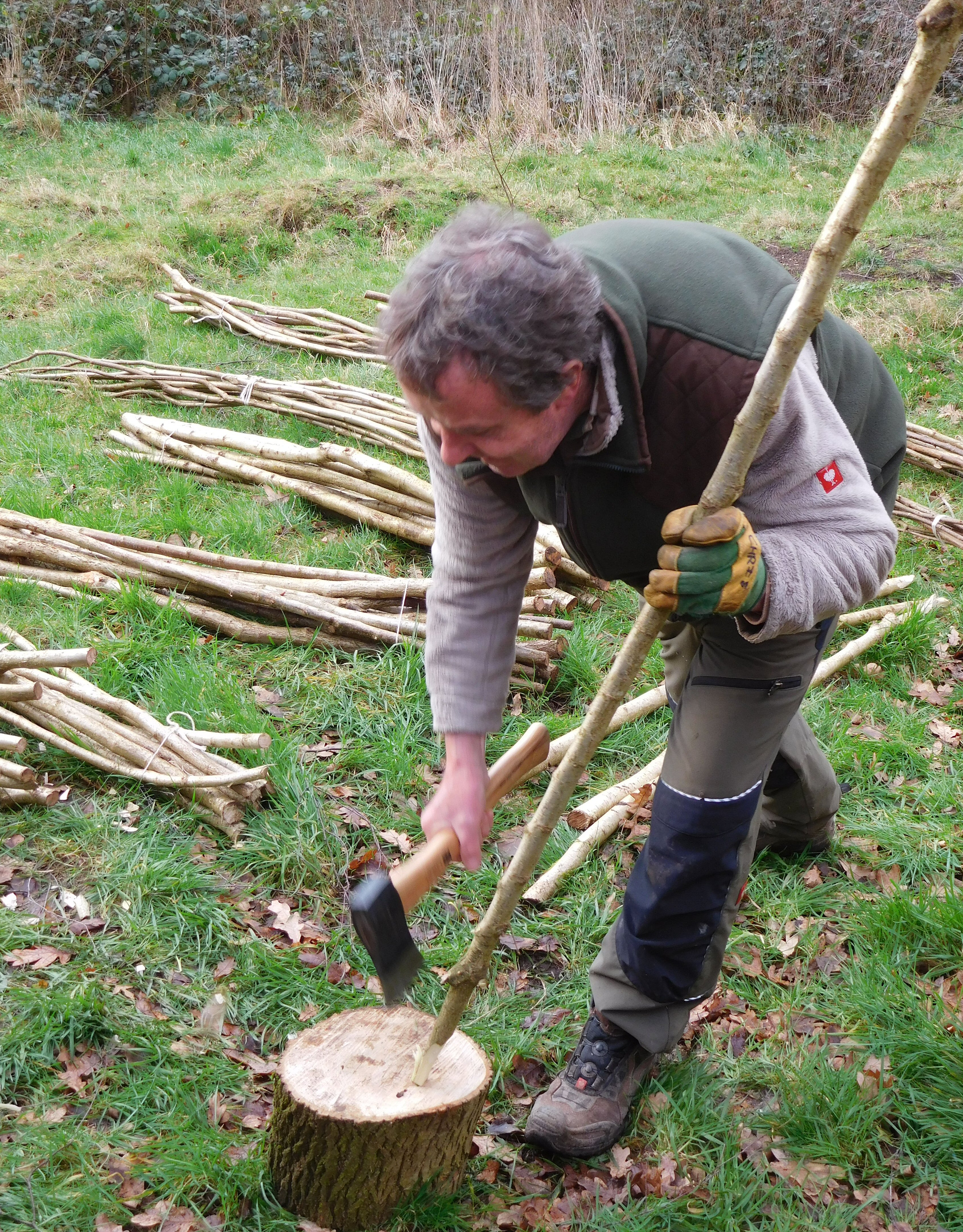
Sharpening a hedge stake. Bundles of stakes (left) and of binders (back) lie ready to use.

The theory behind laying a hedge is easy. The practice is much harder, requiring skill and experience. The aim is to reduce the thickness of the upright stems of the hedgerow trees by cutting away the wood on one side of the stem and in line with the course of the hedge. This being done, each remaining stem is laid down towards the horizontal, along the length of the hedge.

A stem which has been or is to be laid down in this manner is known as a pleacher or pleach. A section of bark and some sapwood must be left connecting a pleacher to its roots to keep the pleacher alive — knowing how much is part of the art of hedgelaying. The angle at which the pleacher is laid is a factor in the build of a hedge. Hedges are built to a height to suit their intended purpose. The height and condition of the trimmed stool, known locally by names such as a stobbin, is vital, as this is where the strongest new growth will come from. In time the pleachers will die, but by then a new stem should have grown, from the stool, from ground level. This takes from eight to fifteen years, after which, if the hedge has not been trimmed, the hedgelaying process can be repeated. Hedges can be trimmed for many years after laying before allowing the top to grow to a sufficient height to lay again.

Smaller shoots branching off the pleachers and upright stems too small to be used as pleachers are known as brash or brush. In most styles of laying, the brash is partly removed and partly woven between the pleachers to add cohesiveness to the finished hedge.

At regular intervals upright stakes are placed along the line of the hedge. These stakes give the finished hedge its final strength. Additional strength and a fancy effect is achieved by binding the uprights with hazel whips woven around the tops of the stakes, and cutting off the tops of all the stakes at the same height and at the same angle. The woven whips are known as binders or heatherings; they can be of any green wood such as birch, ash, or willow which will hold the stakes and tops of the pleachers down securely. The stakes and binders used in hedgelaying when properly used provide strength and stability to the hedge. Binders are not applied simply for visual effect, but in competitive hedgelaying, the appearance of the binders is often one criterion for scoring the work.

Traditionally the hedgelayer's tool was a billhook, supplemented with an axe. Nowadays professional hedgelayers often use a chainsaw on larger pleachers.

== Local styles ==
Over the centuries, different areas developed their own distinctive styles of hedgelaying, based on local customs and also on the locally different requirements and available materials.

=== Midland style ===
Also known as bullock style. This hedge was designed to keep big heavy bullocks in their field. This style is mainly found in Leicestershire, Northamptonshire, Oxfordshire and Warwickshire—traditional beef rearing areas.

Typical features of the style are:

- Stake sides face road or plough land.
- Brush is on the animal side to stop them from eating new growth
- Hedge slopes towards the animals, as stakes are driven in behind the line of the roots.
- Strong binding is below the top of the hedge (so that bullocks cannot twist it off with their horns)

=== Derbyshire style ===
This style is from the county of Derbyshire, a mixed farming and sheep area.

Typical features:

- Square, sawn stakes behind the line of roots.
- Pleachers woven firmly.
- No binding, relies on weaving to keep pleachers in place.
- Brush left the far side.

=== Double staked styles ===
Used in Somerset and Lancashire. Both of the following two styles are good sheep hedges; they use stakes, but as a rule neither uses any type of bindings:

==== Lancashire style ====
Typical features:

- Uses a double row of stakes, placed alternately.
- The most part of each pleacher lies between the two rows of stakes.
- The twiggy bits are pulled to the outside through the stakes, helping to keep everything in place.
- Height varies, from 3' upwards.

==== Westmorland style ====
Typical features of the Westmorland style are:

- Single row of stakes down the centre of the hedge which, when the hedge is finished, can no longer be seen.
- Stems go between the stakes so that alternate ones go to opposite sides of the hedge.
- To finish, twigs at each side and on top are twisted together to produce a square shaped hedge.

=== Brecon style ===
A double brush style, with the twiggy ends of the pleachers kept on both sides of the hedge. Brecon style is practised in Breconshire, Radnorshire, Herefordshire and Monmouthshire.

Typical features:

- Stakes are in the centre of the hedge.
- A lot of stems are cut off and replaced by deadwood—this keeps animals' noses away from the new growth coming from the stumps.
- Pleachers are double-brushed and woven round every stake. This bowing covers the stumps, further protecting the new growth, and hides the stakes.
- The hedge is fairly tall, bound and trimmed square.

=== Montgomery style ===
Typical features:

- A wide hedge.
- Half crops are sometimes used on the outside.
- Pleachers are closely woven and the tops are entwined.
- Trimmed square.
- No binding.

The Stake and Pleach style is used in Monmouthshire, Brecknockshire, Radnorshire, Carmarthenshire and Montgomeryshire. The Flying Hedge style (a low hedge on a bank) is used in Pembrokeshire, Gower, Glamorganshire, Monmouthshire and Carmarthenshire.

=== South of England style ===
Derived from the rougher Sussex Bullock Fence, it has a double-brush style, but the cut base of the pleachers can be seen. Sometimes a pleacher is laid almost flat at the base before the next few are laid at a normal angle, this is presumably to help keep the sheep at bay.

Typical features of the style are:

- Stakes are in the centre of the hedge.
- Bindings are used.
- The hedge is trimmed immediately after laying.

=== Isle of Wight style ===
Now almost extinct, the Isle of Wight style looks untidy but is an effective stockproof barrier and is extremely quick and easy to lay successfully. Pleachers are simply laid one on top of the other, usually in alternating directions, with little of the brash removed, and then pegged down with crooked hazel stakes (similar to thatching spars). It is not suitable for domestic use or competitions, which has contributed to its decline, but is principally now used for restoring overgrown hedges.

Typical features of the style are:

- Style is informal and very wide.
- No binding, stakes at irregular intervals on alternate sides of the hedge.
- Crooked hazel stakes can be made from rejected wands when cutting hazel for other uses.

=== Yorkshire style ===
The Yorkshire style is a sheep hedge as used on mixed arable and livestock farms. It is laid between two arable fields, and is so designed that by the time grass has replaced plough land in the rotation system, the hedge will have grown to a normal height. The base is too dense for sheep to push under it.

Typical features of the style are:

- A very low hedge, with bushes to provide a barrier to wind. Stems lie so close it is almost impossible to see the twigs branching off.
- Sawn stakes, rail nailed on top—because stakes and binders don't grow very plentifully on windy uplands.
- Brush goes both sides.

=== West Country hedges ===
The style of hedge used in Devon, Cornwall and parts of Wales gives rise to the familiar deep Devon lanes. However, they are seldom actually particularly deep, but rather have high banks, which give the impression of depth.

The field is often on the same level as the road. The banks are sometimes faced with stone rather than turf—an earth bank faced with stone—without becoming simply stone walls.

==== Devon style ====
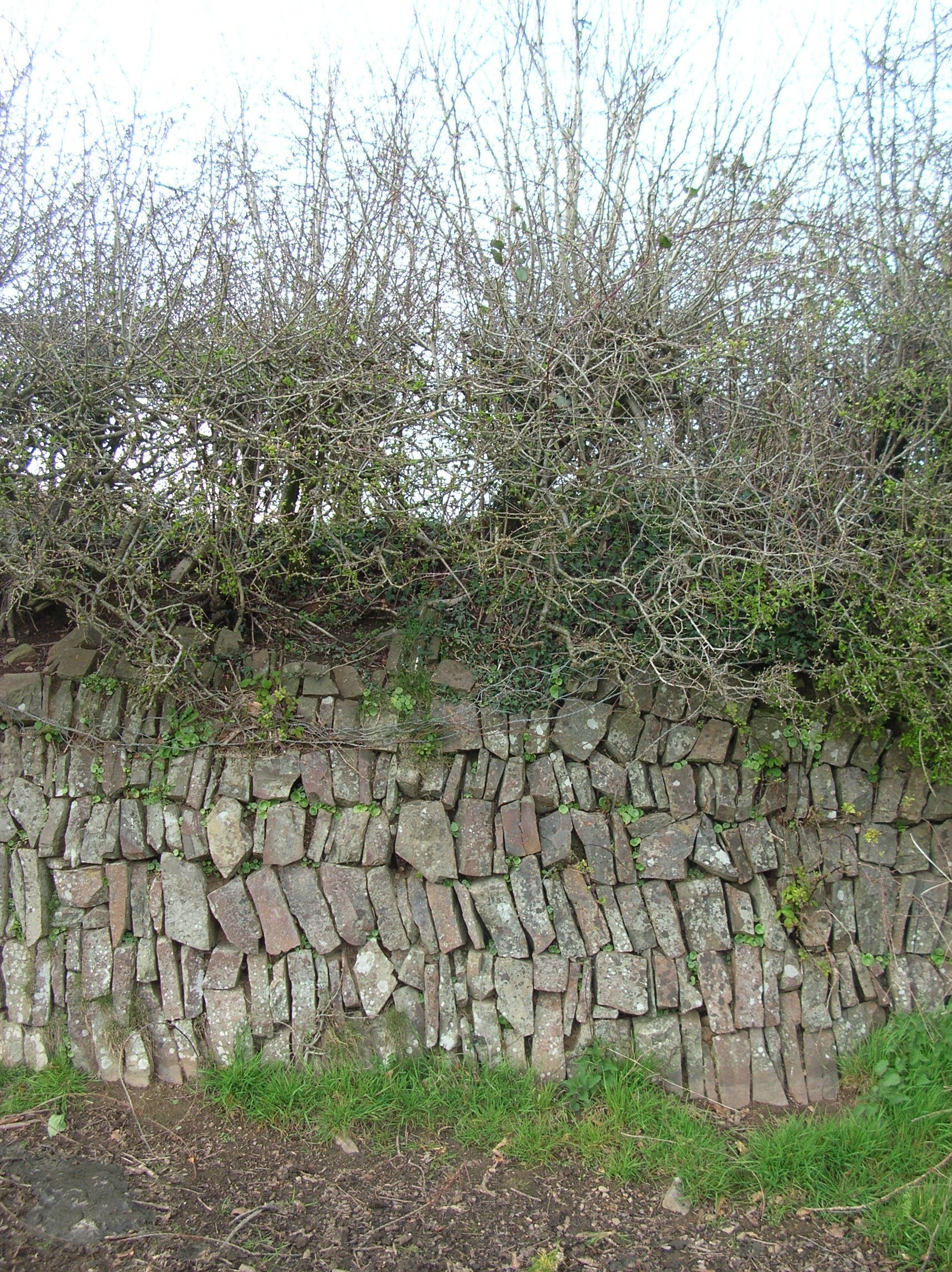
Devon hedge atop earth banks faced with stone

In Devon, hedgelaying is usually referred to as steeping. The pleachers are known as steepers, and are held in place by crooks, forked sticks driven into the centre of the hedgebank. The two sides of the hedge are steeped separately if the hedge is big enough, leaving a gap through the centre of the hedge. When steeping is finished any eroded soil is cast up on top of the hedge to retain a good height of bank.

In this context, the word hedge derives from an earlier one meaning bank – i.e. the division between strips in the medieval farming system. The association comes from the time when after the 18th century enclosures each man had to dig a ditch as his boundary and pile the soil spoil on his side of the ditch. He then had to plant bushes in order to keep his animals on his own land. This 'digging down and stocking up' was very hard work; when creating internal boundaries, the ditch was often left out but the result was still called a hedge.

Typical features of the style are:

- Steepers tight to the top of the bank.
- Steepers secured by crooks.
- Steepers along the crown (top of the face) of the bank.

==== Cornish style ====
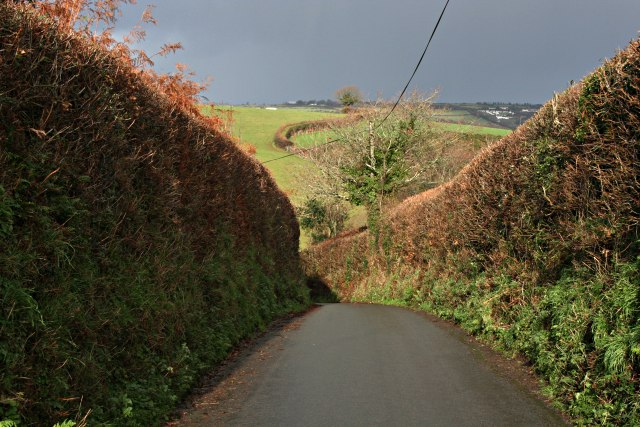
Cornish hedges atop high banks beside a lane

The shrubs are laid along the top of an earth bank faced with stones. Frequently the stones are set in herringbone style. Not all Cornish hedges have shrubs on top of the bank.

=== Motorway style ===
A modern style described first in the TCV Hedging Handbook as "motorway style" has been developed. This style dispenses with heathering and, having a post and rail fence on the field side behind it, does not need to be stockproof. Often stakes are dispensed with as well, almost all the brush trimmed off, the pleachers cut short and then laid low into the post and rail fence.

Modern hedges also tend to leave more trees as standards within the hedge. There is also emerging interest in reviving older methods of using live stakes (crop and pleach style).

== Outside the Republic of Ireland and the United Kingdom ==
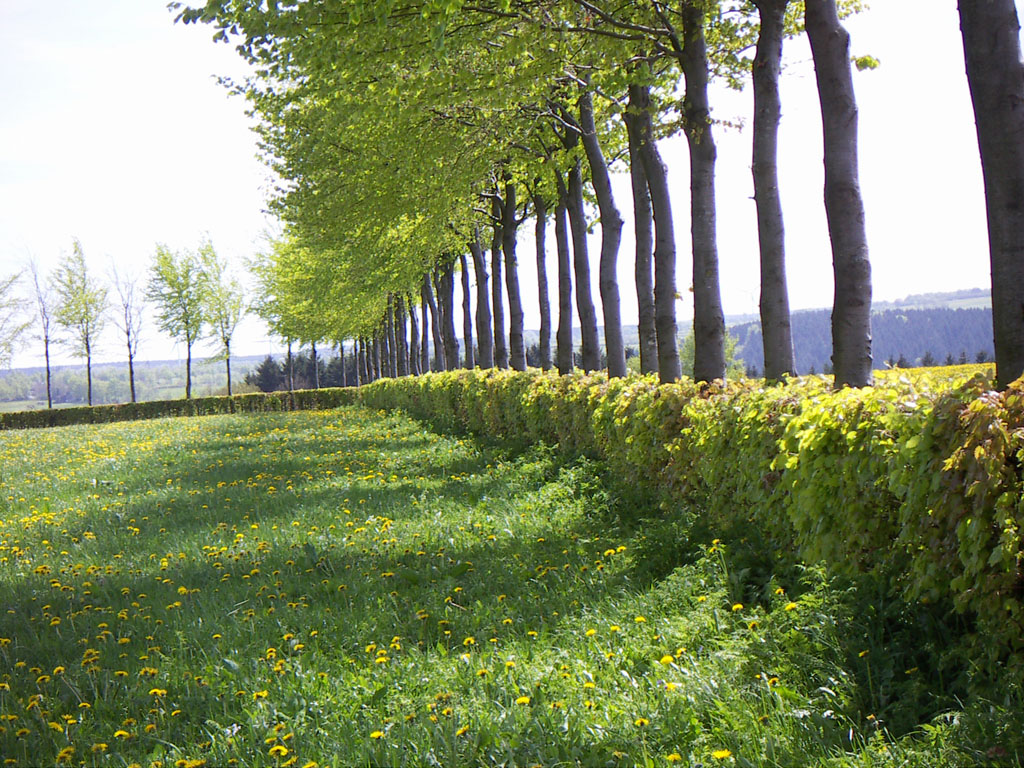
Typical field boundary of red beech hedging (Fagus sylvatica) in the North Eifel in Germany

=== Netherlands ===
In parts of the Netherlands hedgelaying with distinctive styles is practised. With all Dutch styles no stakes or bindings are used. One of every three or four standards is left tall and laid back over the hedge. This dies off and forms a temporary way of holding the hedge in place for a year or two until it becomes re-established. The Netherlands is the only country outside the UK and Ireland to have competitive hedgelaying.

=== Germany ===
In the exposed uplands of the Eifel mountains, a particular type of hedgelaying has been employed since the 17th century that makes use of the characteristics of red beech to shield domestic housing and also to protect fields from damage by cattle and wind erosion and drying. This area, around the town of Monschau, is known as the Monschau Hedge Land, and has become a recognised cultural landscape.

=== North America ===
Andrew Jackson Downing wrote in his 1841 classic, A Treatise on the Theory and Practice of Landscape Gardening adapted to North America, that living fences were not used as often as wooden or stone fences in the United States. However, he was experimenting with native hedge plants, including arborvitae and American corollaries to species that are commonly lain in Britain, such as Newcastle thorn and Washington thorn; he found the buckthorn (unclear which species) to be preferred in New England and the Osage Orange to be popular in the southern states. While he makes no mention of a hedgelaying tradition, he refers to what was then known as "rustic work," where "stout rods of native forest trees are chosen, with the bark on, six to ten feet in length; these are sharpened and driven into the ground in the form of a lattice.... When covered with luxuriant vines and climbing plants, such a barrier is often admirable for its richness and variety."

=== Australia ===
The skill is re-emerging in Australia, particularly in Tasmania. In more temperate parts of Australia the British settlers in the nineteenth century planted hedges of hawthorn. They also took with them the skill of hedgelaying. Although hedgelaying then died out, many hedges survived, and there is now new interest in their conservation.

=== British emigrants ===
Since the influx of the British settling on mainland Europe, the occasional hedgelayer has taken the skill of hedge-laying with them. Although mostly similar to the practical and swiftly worked Isle of Wight style, occasional examples of a laid hedge can be seen on the continent. However regular management is rare, and very few hedgerows are managed in a way sympathetic to the hedgelayer.

== See also ==
- Coppicing
- Dead hedge
- National Hedgelaying Society
- Pleaching
