= Monschau Hedge Land =

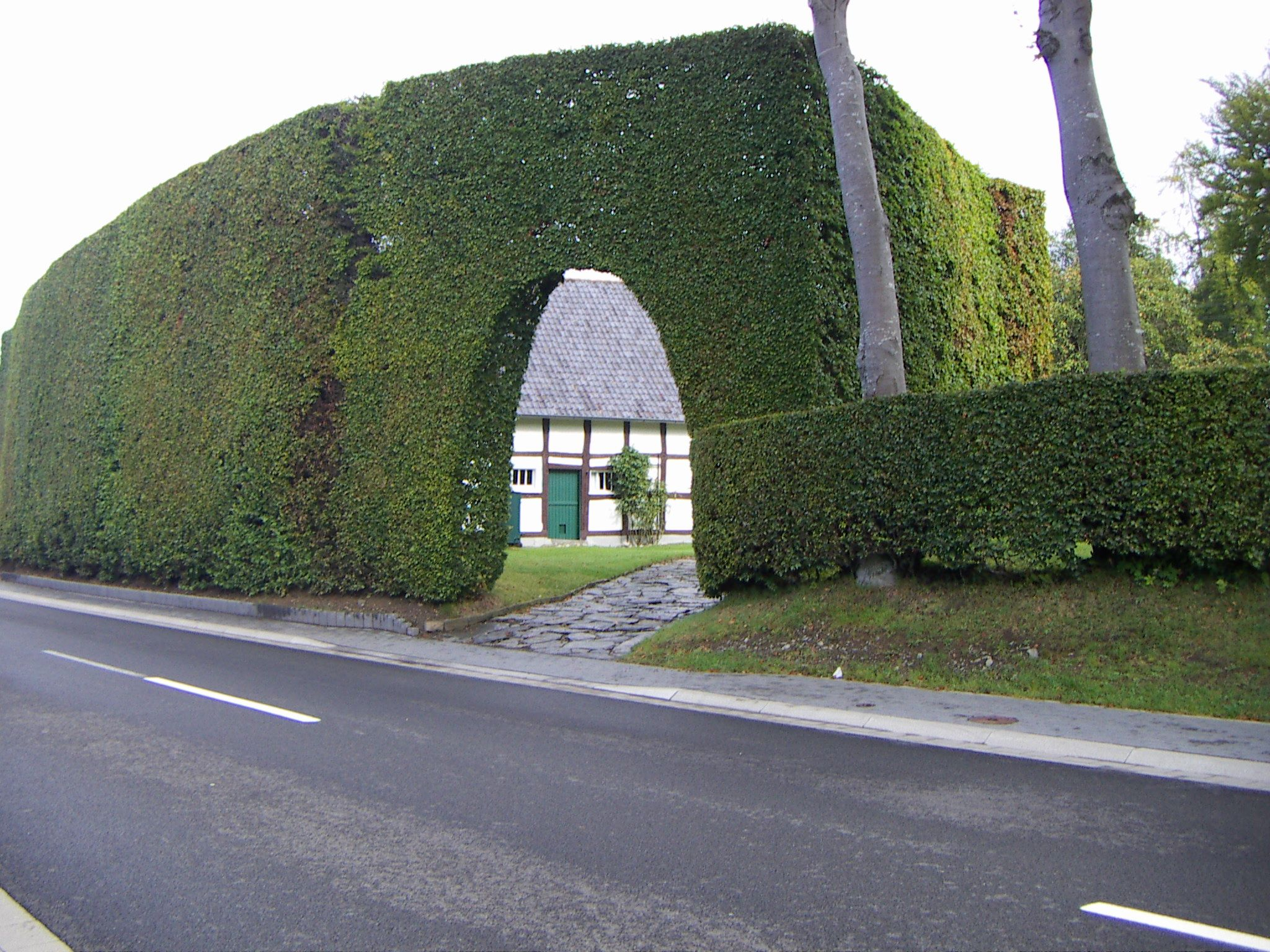
Typical beech hedge in Höfen

The cultural landscape of the Monschau Hedge Land (German: Monschauer Heckenland) or Monschau Hedge Region includes the uplands of the Eifel and the villages around the town of Monschau in the Region of Aachen, covering an area of 94 km^{2}, in which historical hedge structures from the 17th century have survived in great numbers. They consist of individually made, beech hedges around houses and field hedges in the open country, laid to enclose fields and protect them from grazing cattle.

The best example of a Monschau "hedge village" (Heckendorf) is Höfen, which has twice won awards in the best kept village competition Unser Dorf soll schöner werden. Other examples include Kalterherberg, Mützenich, Rohren and Imgenbroich. Also within the region are parts of the municipalities of Simmerath - for example, the villages of Eicherscheid and Kesternich - as well as Roetgen.

== Domestic hedges ==
The treeless uplands of the Eifel (at around 500 metres) east of the High Fens in Germany's border region with Belgium are exposed to strong - and in winter, ice-cold - west winds; this is even reflected in the name of Kalterherberg (kalt = "cold"). The laying of protective hedges made of beech in the Monschau Land is recorded from the late 17th century. They grow to a size of 0.7 to 1 metre thick and 6 to 10 metres high and are thus higher than the houses in places; they can be over 40 metres long. The hedges are given stability by a careful interweaving of stems and branches and regularly trimming.

The hedges retain their withered leaves from the preceding year until the following spring and thus provide wind protection throughout the winter; in summer by contrast they provide shade and have a cooling effect. Openings in the shape of archways give access to the houses. Many hedges also have "window openings"; there is thus a variety of shapes among the roughly 1,000 examples.

In the 21st century the historic hedges also have an aesthetic significance and on contemporary houses there are many imitations of the hedges. There are annual awards in October, made by an evaluation commission in the region of Aachen, for the most creative hedge gardeners in the municipalities of Monschau, Simmerath and Roetgen.

== Field hedges ==
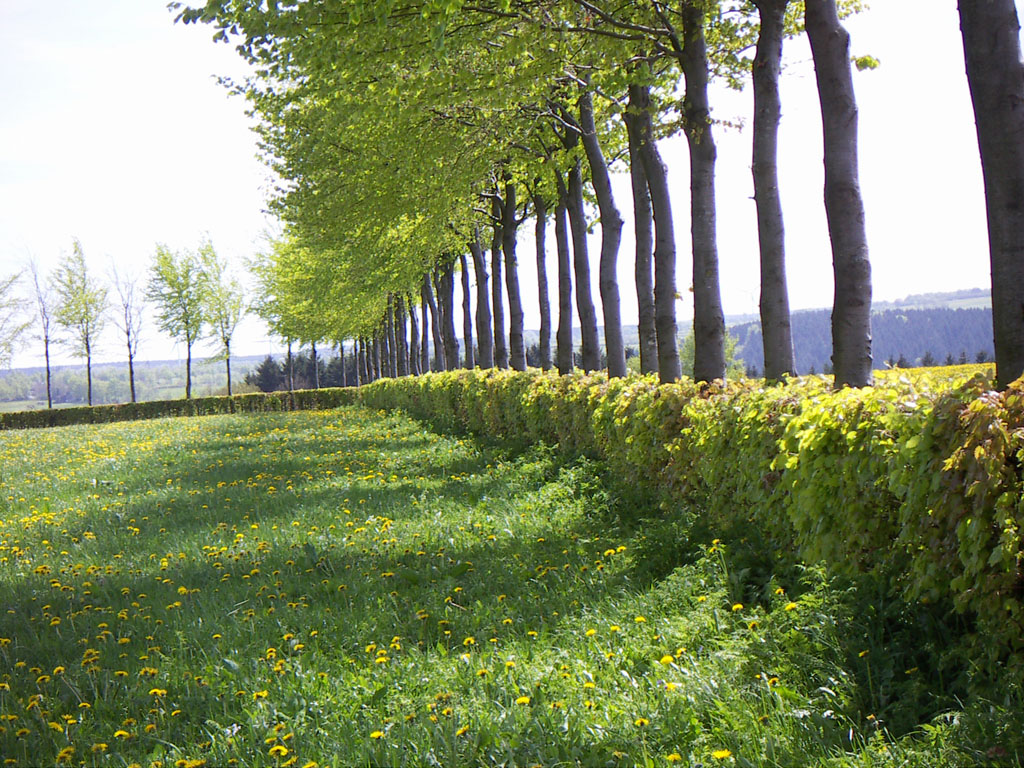
Typical field boundary of beech hedging (Fagus sylvatica) in the North Eifel. At regular distances upright stems are left standing.

Field hedges instead of fences or barbed wire to protect fields from damage from nearby grazing cattle are widespread across the Monschau Land. They are typically made from beech. At regular intervals individual stems are allowed to stand, that grow into large trees. As well as their protective enclosure function they act as windbreaks. By reducing the wind speed, soil erosion is minimised and the fields protected from drying out. The hedges also provide habitats for rodents and resting sites for migrating birds. The wood of the pleached trees is still widely used today for firewood.

== Tourism ==
The Eifel Club, together with the German-Belgian Nature Park and the town of Monschau issues the flyer "Das Monschauer Heckenland". Around Höfen, a circular walk, the ca. 5-kilometre long Höfen Hedge Way (Höfener Heckenweg) has been laid out, with 10 information stations. Between the Eifelsteig trail and the village of Eicherscheid runs the so-called Hedgeland Route (Heckenlandroute), a premium trail that gives an insight into the hedge landscape in and around Eicherscheid.

== See also ==
- Hedge laying

== Bibliography ==
- Ulrike Schwieren-Höger, Natur- und Kulturführer Nationalpark Eifel und seine neun Städte und Gemeinden. Gaasterland-Verlag, Düsseldorf, 2007, ISBN 978-3-935873-22-2
- Robert Beckmann, Die Hausschutzhecken im Monschauer Land unter besonderer Berücksichtigung ihrer klimatischen Auswirkungen. Dissertation an der Fakultät für Bauwesen der Rheinisch-Westfälischen Technischen Hochschule Aachen, Aachen, 1979
