= Valerie Greaves (hedge layer) =

British hedge layer

- Greaves from a 1977 newspaper
- Born: Valerie Ann Greaves; April 1927; Bromsgrove, England
- Died: 24 December 2013 (aged 86)
- Occupations: Hedgelayer, teacher
- Website: www.hedgelaying.org.uk

Valerie Greaves (April 1927 – 24 December 2013) co-founded the National Hedgelaying Society (NHLS) in 1978. She was the first woman to compete in hedge laying competitions in England, including at Eccleshall in 1976 and Fernie Hunt in 1981 She was the author of Hedgelaying Explained (1985).

== Personal life ==
Valerie Ann Greaves was born in 1927. She grew up on a 100-acre farm, which she was running by the age of 15. She joined the Young Farmers' Club and served on its committee. She became a schoolteacher, working at a middle school in Redditch, and later returned to farming in the Birmingham area.

== Hedgelaying ==
About her hedge laying she said, "I was brought up on a farm and was only a child when I first laid a hedge." When she rented a field for her horses that was "not stockproof" she couldn't afford to have a fence built, so laid a hedge herself. She earned an ATB Proficiency Certificate in hedge laying and travelled the "length of England studying regional styles."

In 1976 Greaves was the first woman to compete in the Eccleshall hedge laying competition, where the organisers "hastily rearranged the prize schedule to include a special prize for women hedge layers." In the same year she was also the only woman to compete at a hedge laying contest at No-Man-Heath, Coleshill. She was the first woman to compete in the Fernie Hunt hedge-cutting competition in November 1981 winning a 'special effort' award. She also saw success in national championships.

=== National Hedgelaying Society (NHLS) ===
Together with Fred Whitefoot and Clive Matthew, Greaves co-founded the National Hedgelaying Society (NHLS) on 11 November 1978, to try to ensure that the skills of hedge-laying, developed over centuries, were not lost. By the 1980s she was the secretary of the organisation, through which she published Hedgelaying Explained in 1985. By 1991 she was no longer laying hedges herself, but acted as NHLS's publicity officer. By 1998 she had become the society's vice-president, and was called to speak at a parliamentary select committee about hedge protection, dating, removal and planting on behalf of the NHLS.
