= Kesternich =

Sulfur dioxide testing

Kesternich testing is a common name for sulfur dioxide testing. There are several test methods available, including DIN 50018, ISO 22479, and ASTM G87, which are some of the more common methods. Industrial objects (especially metal objects subject to corrosion) often are rated in Kesternich cycles (a measure of resistance to corrosion).

Kesternich testing is a term commonly used in Germany to describe a standardized corrosion test in a sulfur dioxide (SO₂) environment. Industrial objects, particularly metals and coated surfaces, are often rated in Kesternich cycles, representing the number of test cycles an object can endure before corrosion becomes evident.

Several test methods exist, the more widely used standards includes:

- DIN 50018 is the original German standard for the Kesternich test
- ISO 3231 is an international equivalent describing similar cyclic corrosion tests with SO₂
- ASTM G87 is a related U.S. standard for sulfur dioxide/condensation tests

== See also ==
For chambers to run this test see: Kesternich test
