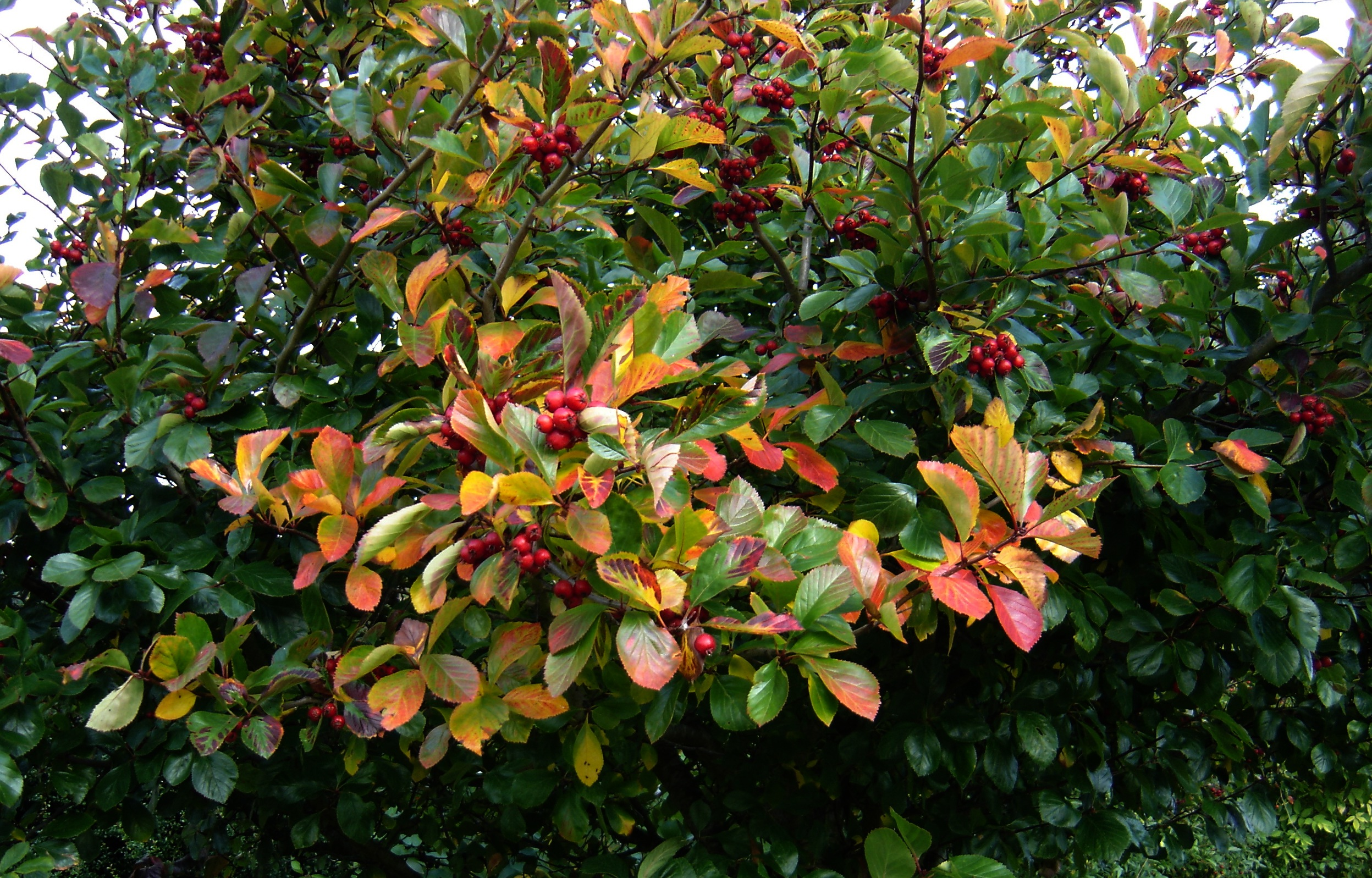
- In early fall

Scientific classification
- Kingdom: Plantae
- Clade: Tracheophytes
- Clade: Angiosperms
- Clade: Eudicots
- Clade: Rosids
- Order: Rosales
- Family: Rosaceae
- Subtribe: Malinae
- Genus: Crataegus
- Species: C. persimilis

Binomial name
- Crataegus persimilis Sarg.

Synonyms
- Crataegus cerasina Sarg.; Crataegus crus-galli var. prunifolia Torrey & A.Gray; Crataegus heldebergensis Sarg.; Crataegus laetifica Sarg.; Crataegus livoniana Sarg.; Crataegus ovalifolia (Hornem.) DC.; Crataegus prunifolia (Poir.) Bosc ex DC.; Crataegus prunifolia (Poir.) Pers.; Crataegus prunifolia Pers.; Crataegus robusta Sarg.; Crataegus splendens Lodd.; Mespilus prunifolia Poir.

= Crataegus persimilis =

Species of hawthorn

Crataegus persimilis is a species of hawthorn, known by the common names plumleaf hawthorn and broad-leaved cockspur thorn, native to southern Ontario, Canada, and the US states of New York, Pennsylvania, Ohio, Kentucky, West Virginia, and Virginia. It is widely cultivated, particularly in Europe, as an ornamental. Its sporadic distribution in its natural range and certain of its morphological characters leads authorities to consider it a probable naturally occurring hybrid, with its most likely parents being Crataegus succulenta (fleshy hawthorn) and Crataegus crus-galli (cockspur hawthorn). At least some specimens of this taxon are tetraploid. Some populations may be self-perpetuating by seed. The 'Prunifolia' cultivar is considered one of the top five trees for smaller gardens.

== Description ==
Consistent with the hypothesis that C. persimilis is a relatively newly arisen hybrid species, there is quite a bit of variation in botanical characters between individuals. The variable traits include the shapes of the leaves, hairs and scales (or the lack thereof) on inflorescences, number of stamens, the color of the anthers, and pitting and other ornamentation (or lack thereof) of the pyrenas. The type specimen, collected along the Genesee River near Rochester, New York, has the narrowest leaves, and the most stamens (10 to 20), of any described specimen. It also has pink anthers, sparsely pubescent corymbs, and deeply pitted pyrenas. The cultivated 'Prunifolia' has a much broader leaves as well as densely pubescent or nearly tomentose corymbs, and only ten pink anthers.

C. persimilis are shrubs or trees, 5 to 6 m tall and spreading with a dome-like growth form to about the same width. New twigs and stems are glabrous, with one year old bark a brownish purple, older growth is dull gray. The thorns found on twigs can be straight or recurved. Once the thorns have been on the tree for two years they are a shiny purplish black, and 4 to 7 cm long. Typically older branches and the trunk do not have thorns.

Its deciduous leaves are glabrous and coriaceous. The dark green leaf blades are more or less narrowly obovate to broadly elliptic or rhombic-elliptic, 4 to 5 cm long, with serrate margins.

The flowers are five-petaled and are white, with cream or pink anthers. The fruits are pomes, and bright scarlet when mature. They flower in May and fruit much later, in September or October. In autumn the leaves take on a striking range of colors from deep yellow to a fiery orange to scarlet and on to purple.

== Uses ==
The C. persimilis cultivar 'Prunifolia' is used as a street tree, and is often used in gardens as an ornamental, especially for its spectacular autumn display. It is dense enough to use as a hedge or windbreak.

== Pest and diseases ==
C. persimilis is susceptible to fire blight (Erwinia amylovora) but has some resistance. It is affected by hawthorn sawfly leaf miners (Profenusa canadensis), but they seldom cause serious damage to healthy plants. It may also be afflicted by leaf spot (Diplocarpon mespili), caterpillars, gall mites and aphids.
