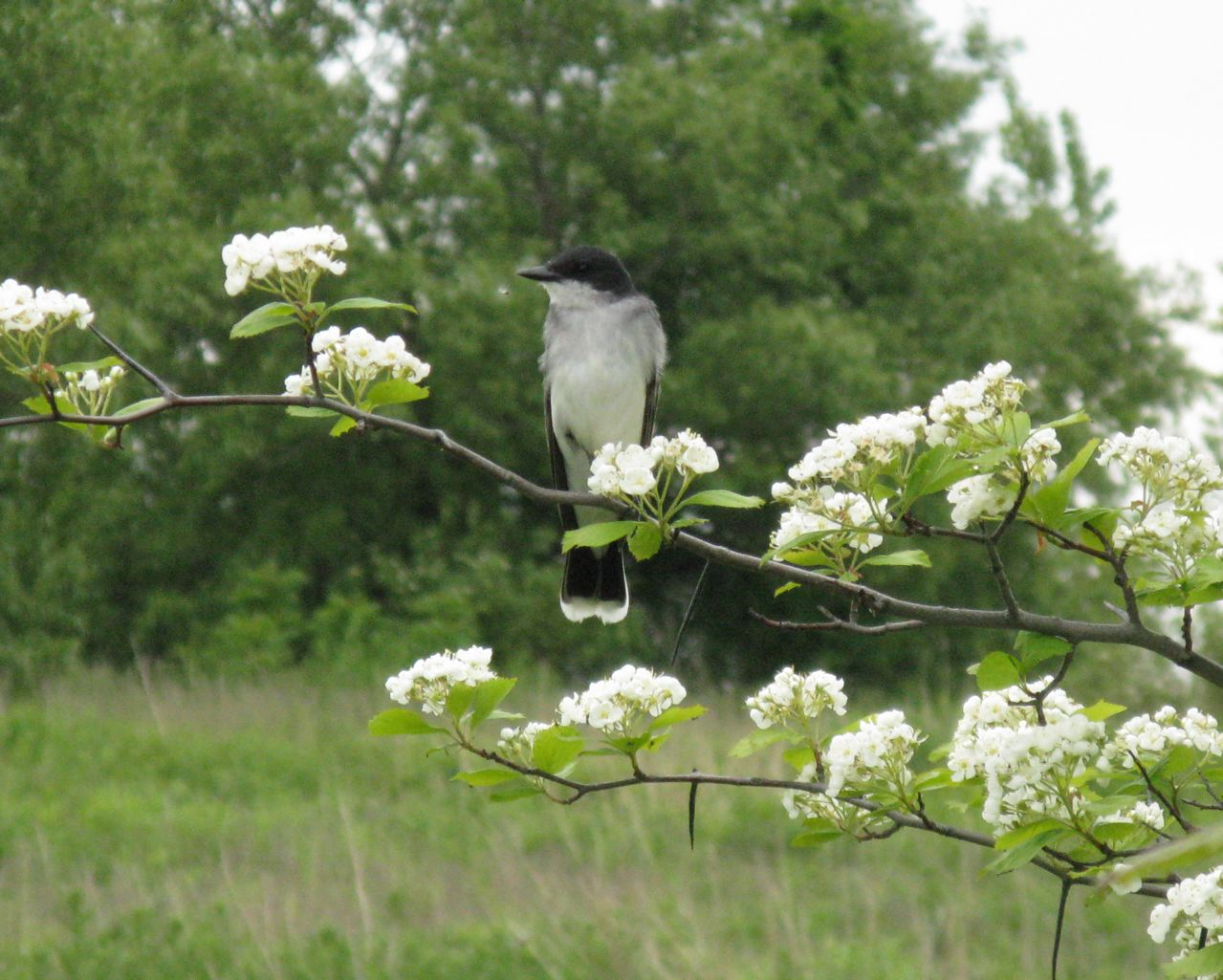

Conservation status
- Least Concern (IUCN 3.1)

Scientific classification
- Kingdom: Plantae
- Clade: Tracheophytes
- Clade: Angiosperms
- Clade: Eudicots
- Clade: Rosids
- Order: Rosales
- Family: Rosaceae
- Genus: Crataegus
- Section: Crataegus sect. Coccineae
- Series: Crataegus ser. Macracanthae
- Species: C. succulenta

Binomial name
- Crataegus succulenta Schrad. ex Link

Synonyms
- C. ambrosia Sarg. C. ardula Sarg. C. bicknellii Eggl. C. celsa Sarg. C. macracantha Loudon; C. neofluvialis Ashe; C. occidentalis Britton...many others

= Crataegus succulenta =

Species of hawthorn

Crataegus succulenta is a species of hawthorn known by the common names fleshy hawthorn, succulent hawthorn, and round-fruited cockspurthorn. It is "the most wide-ranging hawthorn in North America", native to much of southern Canada, and the United States as far south as Arizona, New Mexico, Kansas, Missouri, North Carolina, and Tennessee. In this wide area there are many variant forms that have received species names, but can also be considered as synonyms. It is thought to be the parent, along with Crataegus crus-galli, of the tetraploid species Crataegus persimilis.

The fruit is edible and can be made into jelly or crushed to make tea.

== Images ==
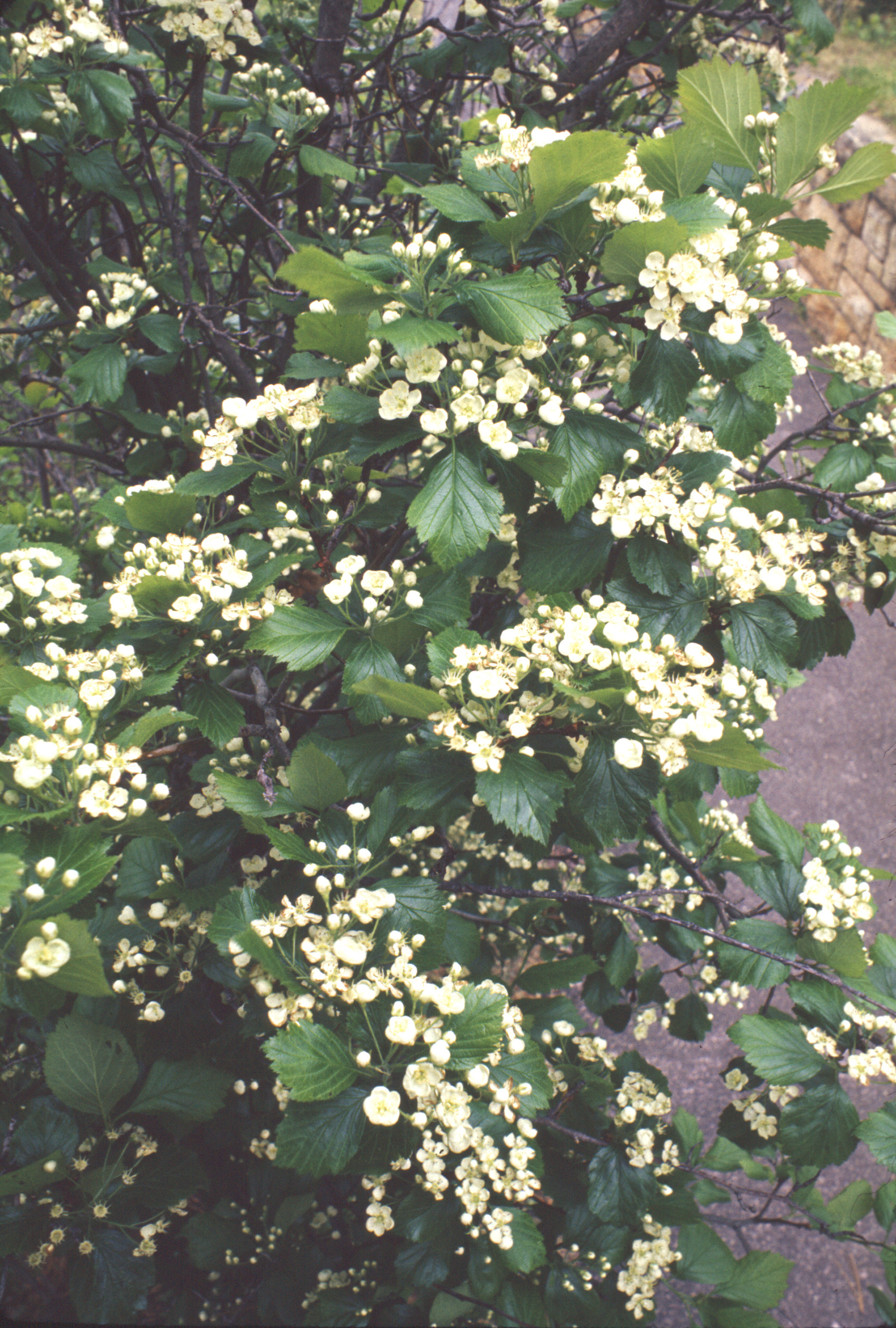

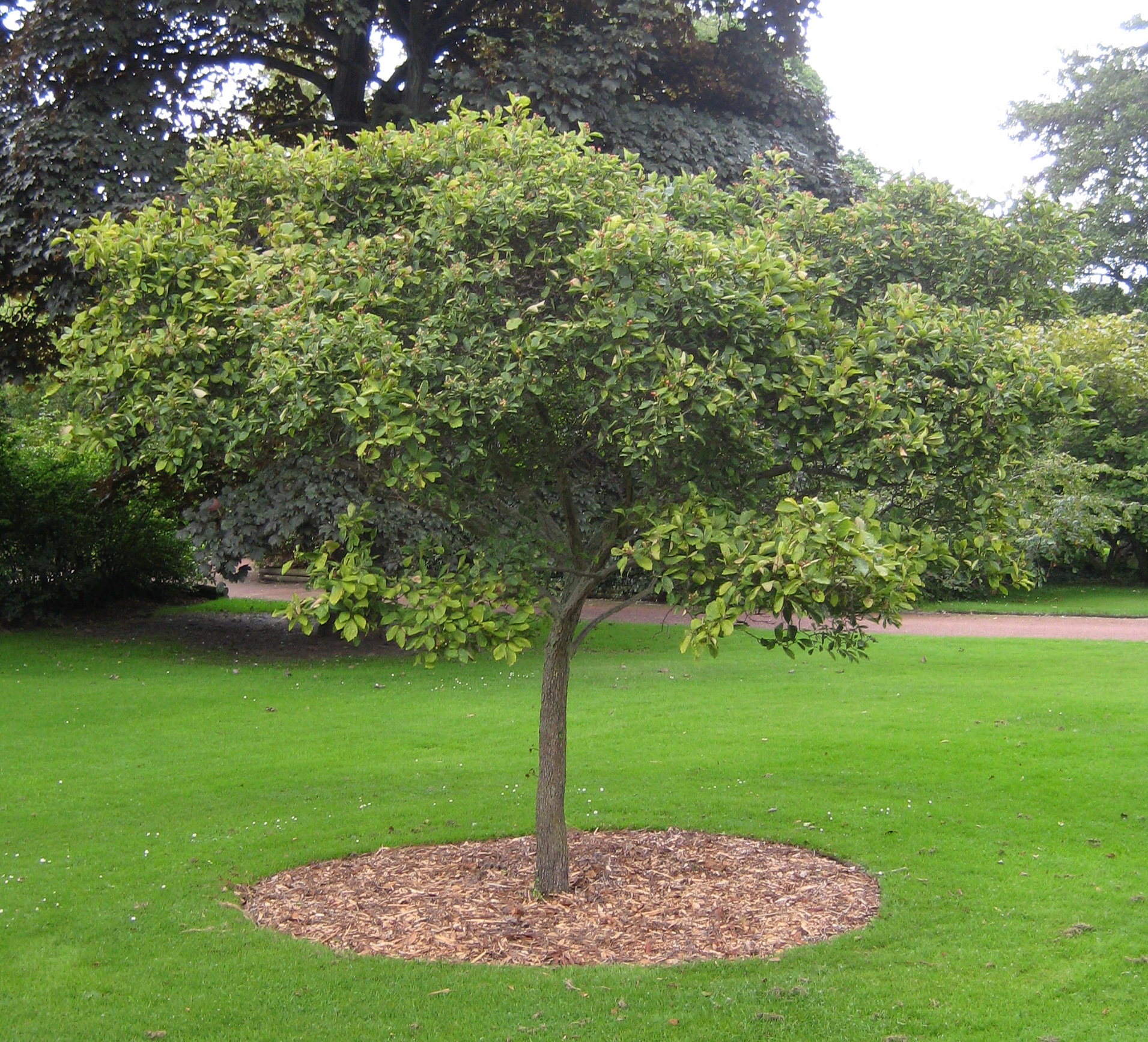
