= National Hedgelaying Society =

British hedgelaying charity

- Abbreviation: NHLS
- Formation: 11 November 1978
- Website: www.hedgelaying.org.uk

The National Hedgelaying Society (NHLS) is the only British charity devoted to the art of hedgelaying and the restoration and creation of hedgerows.

NHLS was formed on 11 November 1978 by Valerie Greaves, Clive Matthew and Fred Whitefoot.

The society runs hedgelaying competitions and exhibitions in the UK, and an optional accreditation scheme for hedgelayers. Charles III is a patron of the organization, and in December 2021 he presented awards on behalf of the society at Highgrove estate.
