= Kesternich test =

The Kesternich test is a common name for the corrosion test with sulfur dioxide (SO_{2}) under general moisture condensation. This test was developed in 1951 by Wilhelm Kesternich to simulate the damaging effects of acid rain. Acid rain and acidic industrial pollutants are corrosive and can degrade coatings and plated surfaces. Kesternich testing, or sulfur dioxide testing, simulates acid rain or industrial chemical exposure to evaluate the relative corrosion resistance of the coating, substrate, or part itself. The test can be used for coatings or for base materials. The test method is defined by various standards, DIN EN ISO 6988, DIN 50018, ASTM G87, ISO 3231, ISO 22479 are the most common. The parts to be tested are placed in a test chamber with a capacity of 300L and exposed to warm, moist air in combination with a certain amount of sulfur dioxide

Note: Sulfur is interchangeable with Sulphur and SO2 is the abbreviation for Sulfur/Sulphur Dioxide

== Equipment ==
The test chamber has a set volume of 300L. The construction of the inner housing of the chamber and the devices for arranging the samples must be made of inert and corrosion-resistant materials so that there is no reaction between the sample to be tested and the material of the chamber. The SO_{2} injection can be performed manually or automatically depending on the chamber.

== Principle ==
The principle of the test is simple:

• A defined amount of distilled or deionized water is poured into the floor pan of the test chamber.

• The samples are placed in the chamber above the water level. The door or hood of the chamber is tightly closed and hermetically sealed for safety.

• A fixed volume of sulfur dioxide is introduced into the chamber, usually either 1 L (0.33%) or 2 L (0.66%) Volume of SO_{2}.

The test is performed in two sections,

o Test section 1: 8 hours warm-up to 40±3 °C (relative humidity 100%)

o Test section 2: 16 hours cooling to 18 to 28 °C (relative humidity max. 75 %)

The test is usually carried out in cycles of 24 hours each.

Caution: The atmosphere containing sulfur dioxide must not be released into the room air.

== Evaluation ==
Take samples from the chamber and let them dry in the room air. An initial assessment is made before any corrosion products are removed. When the tested parts are cleaned, the evaluation criteria must be taken into account. Possible characteristics for evaluation: appearance after the test, appearance after removal of the corrosion products, number and size of imperfections, time to first corrosion, loss of mass. The results are described in a test report.

== Sources ==
• DIN EN ISO 6988 Metallic and other inorganic coatings - Test with sulfur dioxide with general moisture condensation, March 1997.

• DIN 50018 testing in an alternating condensation climate with an atmosphere containing sulfur dioxide, June 1997.

• The importance of corrosion test procedures with special consideration of the SO_{2} test according to DIN 50018, Wilhelm Kesternich, published in Materials and Corrosion Volume 16, Issue 3, pages 193-201, March 1965.
