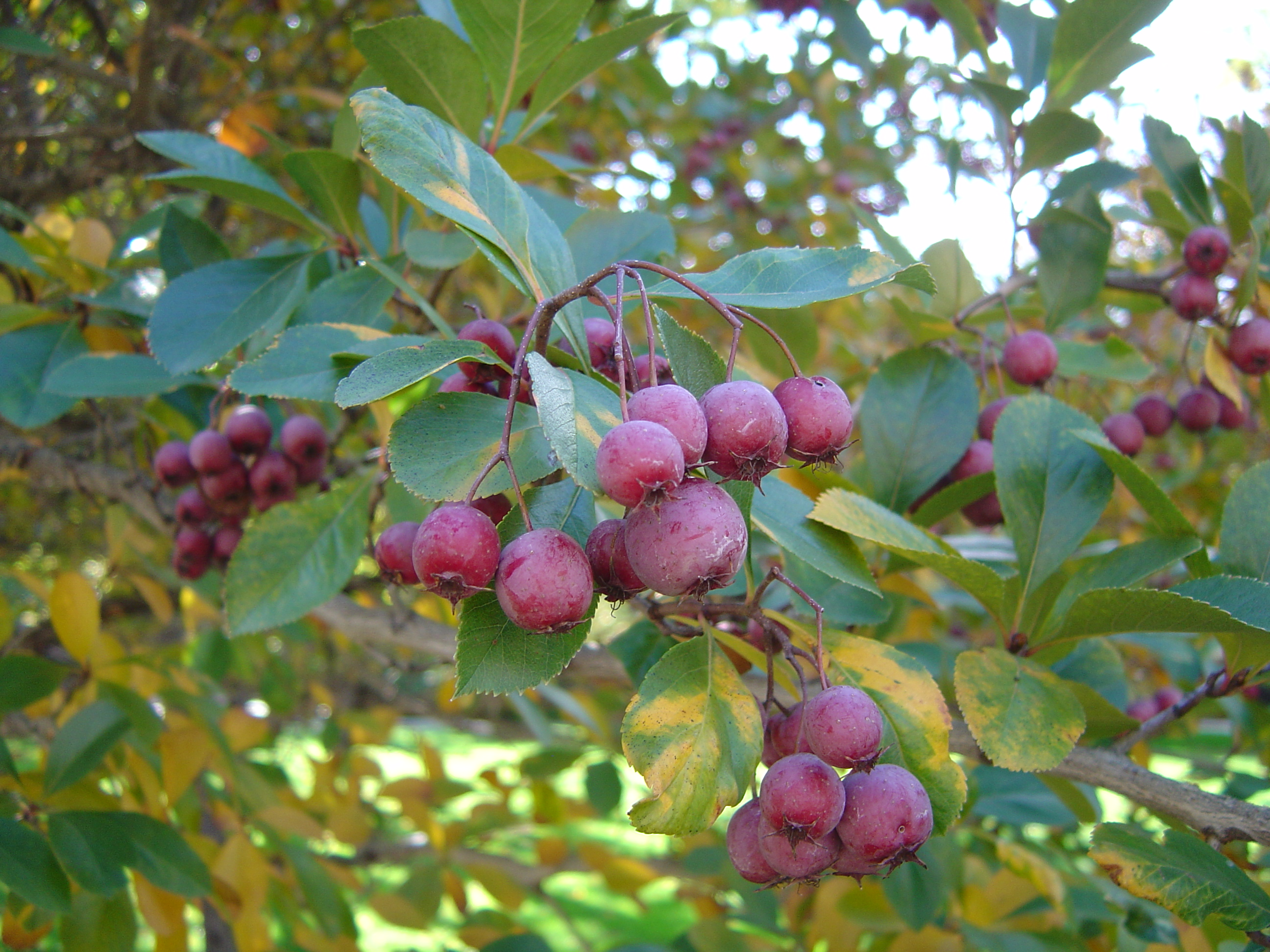
- A cultivated form

Conservation status
- Least Concern (IUCN 3.1)

Scientific classification
- Kingdom: Plantae
- Clade: Tracheophytes
- Clade: Angiosperms
- Clade: Eudicots
- Clade: Rosids
- Order: Rosales
- Family: Rosaceae
- Genus: Crataegus
- Section: Crataegus sect. Coccineae
- Series: Crataegus ser. Crus-galli
- Species: C. crus-galli

Binomial name
- Crataegus crus-galli L.

Synonyms
- Synonyms list: Crataegus acutifolia Sarg.; Crataegus albanthera Sarg.; Crataegus arborea Beadle; Crataegus barrettiana Sarg.; Crataegus calophylla Sarg.; Crataegus candens Sarg.; Crataegus cherokeensis Sarg.; Crataegus consueta Sarg.; Crataegus hamata E.J.Palmer; Crataegus hannibalensis E.J.Palmer; Crataegus infera Sarg.; Crataegus leptophylla Sarg.; Crataegus limnophylla Sarg.; Crataegus ludovicensis Sarg.; Crataegus monosperma Sarg.; Crataegus pachyphylla Sarg.; Crataegus paradoxa Sarg.; Crataegus parkiae Sarg.; Crataegus permera Sarg.; Crataegus phaneroneura Sarg.; Crataegus polyclada Sarg.; Crataegus pyracanthoidesBeadle; Crataegus regalis Beadle; Crataegus rubrifolia Sarg.; Crataegus rudis Sarg.; Crataegus severa Sarg.; Crataegus strongylophylla Sarg.; Crataegus tantula Sarg.; Crataegus tardiflora Sarg.; Crataegus tenax Ashe; Crataegus tenuispina Sarg.; Crataegus truncata Sarg.

= Crataegus crus-galli =

Species of hawthorn

Crataegus crus-galli is a species of hawthorn known by the common names cockspur hawthorn, cockspur thorn, Newcastle hawthorne, Newcastle thorn, hog apple. It is native to North America and is widely used in horticulture. It produces edible fruit.

== Description ==
This is a small tree growing up to about 10 meters tall and 8 meters wide, rounded in form when young and spreading and flattening as it matures. The leaves are 5 to 6 centimeters long, glossy dark green in color and turning gold to red in the fall. The flowers are white and have a scent generally considered unpleasant. The fruits are small pomes that vary in colour, usually a shade of red. Most wild varieties of the tree are heavily armed in sharp thorns several centimeters long.

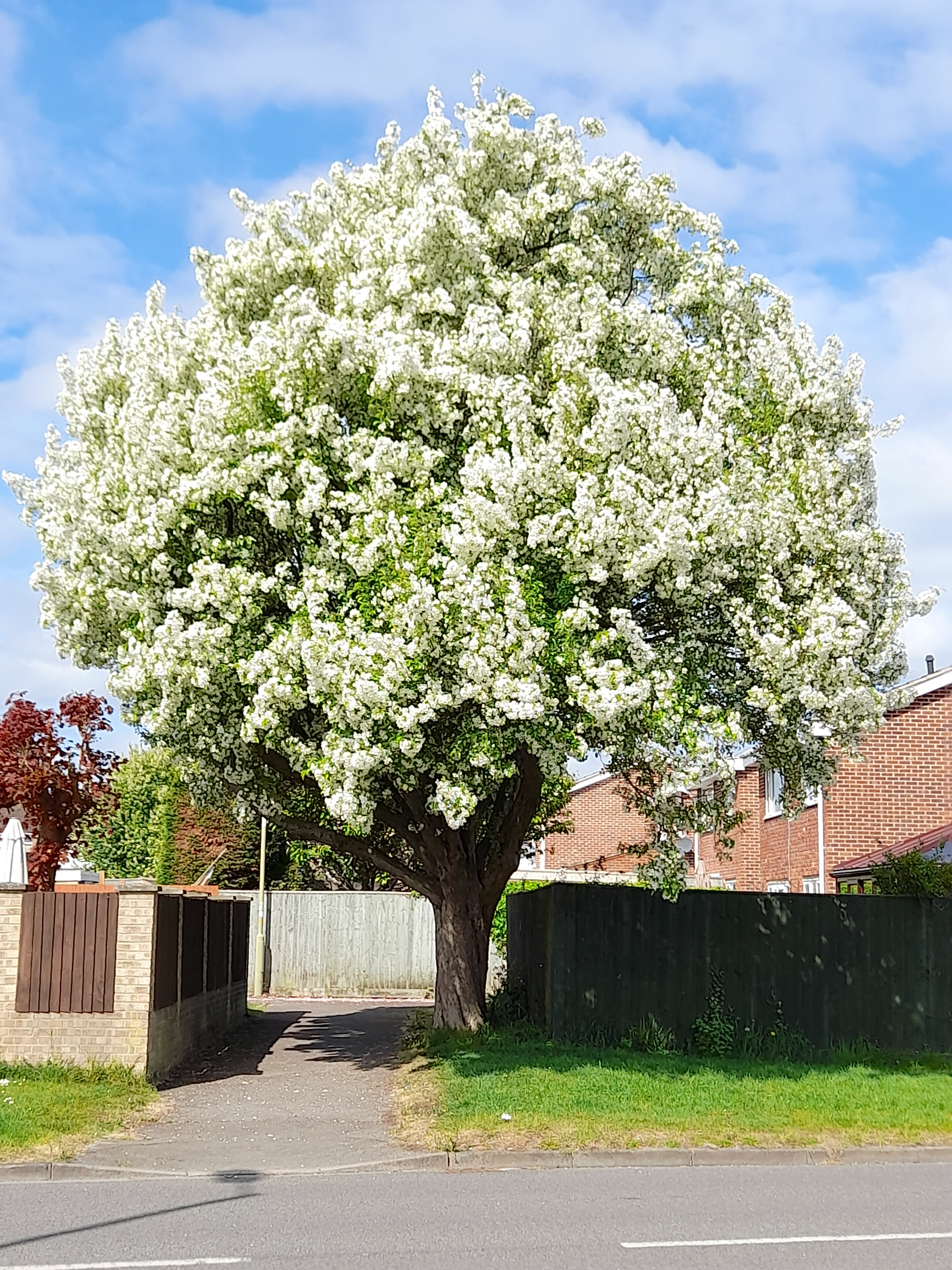
A Cockspur Thorn tree in flower, Oxfordshire UK, 5th May 2022.

== Taxonomy ==
It is thought to be the parent, along with Crataegus succulenta, of the tetraploid species Crataegus persimilis.

== Distribution and habitat ==
It is native to eastern North America from Ontario to Texas to Florida.

== Cultivation ==
This species is a popular ornamental tree, especially var. inermis, which lacks thorns. Many other wild forms would be very suitable for landscaping if better known, and yellow-fruited forms exist.

== Uses ==
The fruit is edible and can be made into jelly or crushed to make tea.

== Images ==
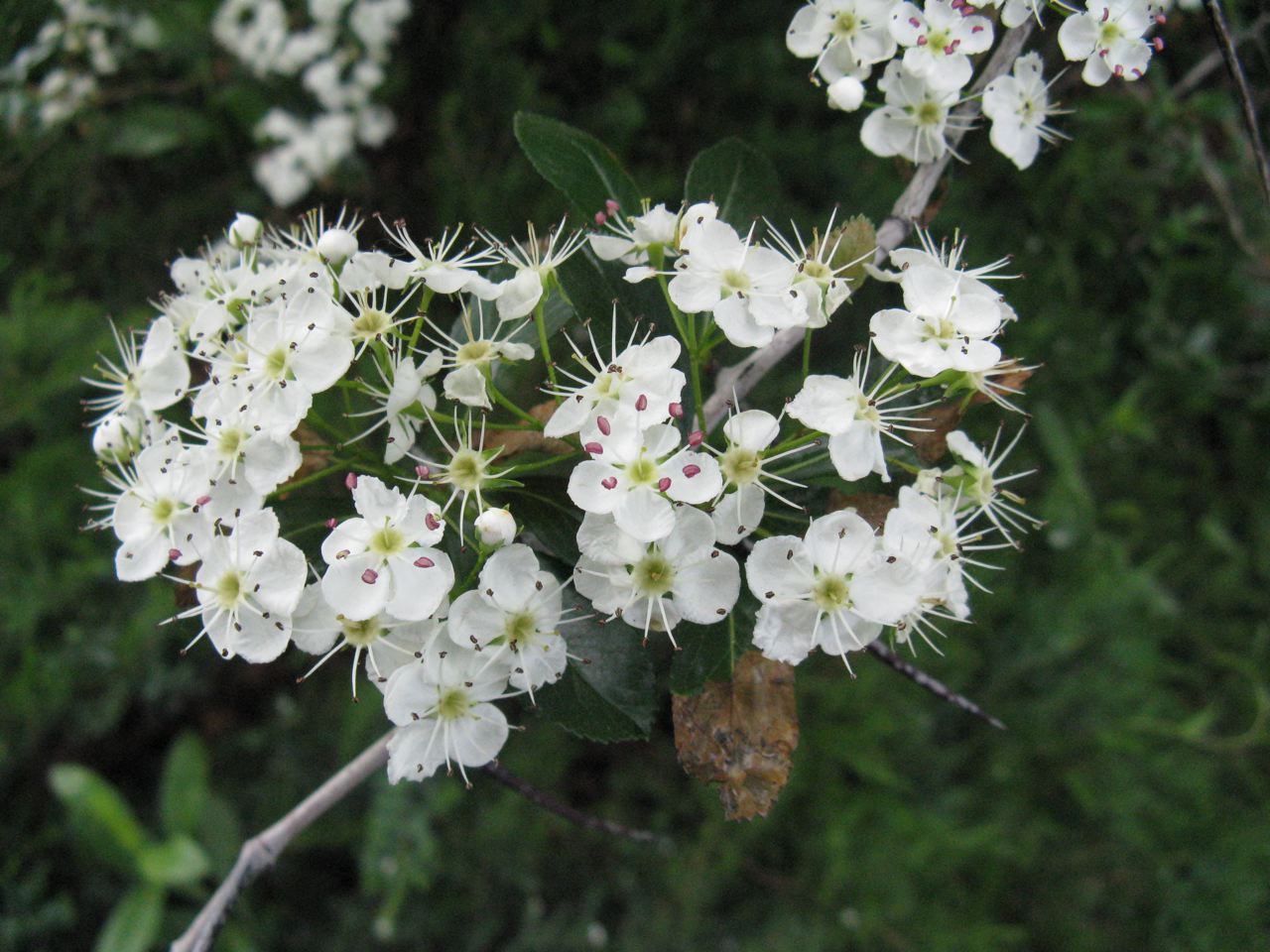
C. crus-galli var. pyracanthifolia

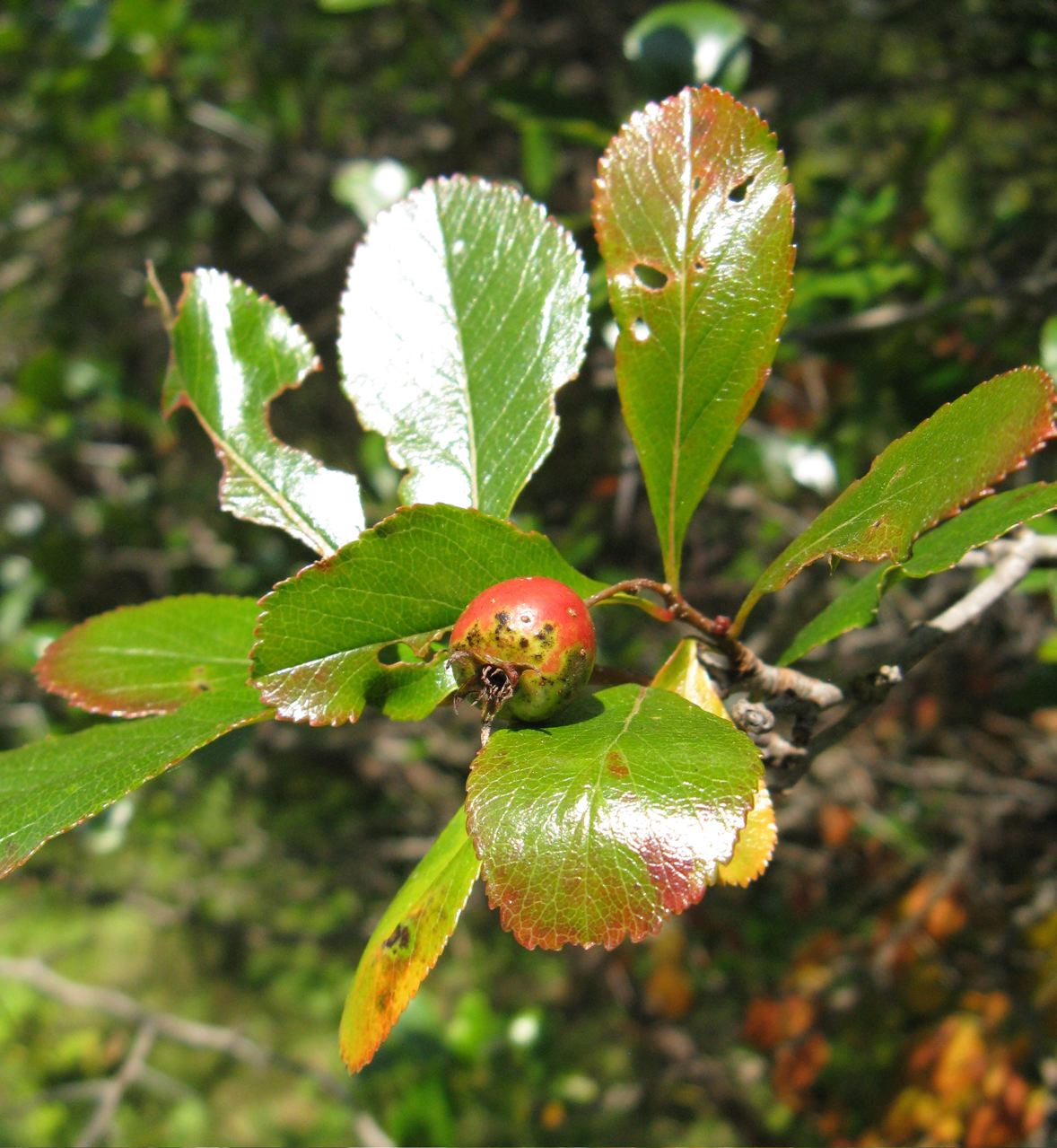
C. crus-galli var. pyracanthifolia

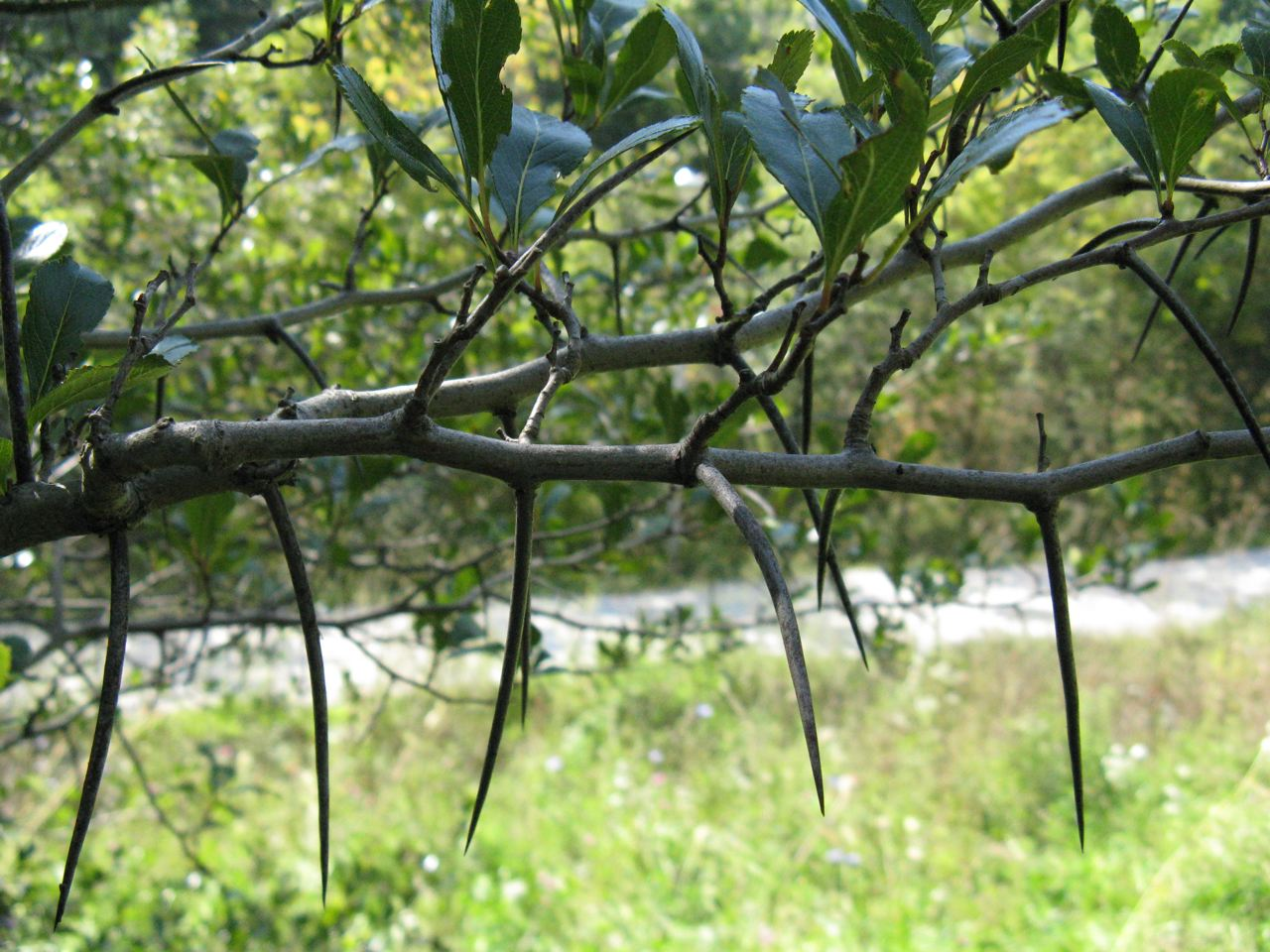
Thorns on 2 to 3-year old branches

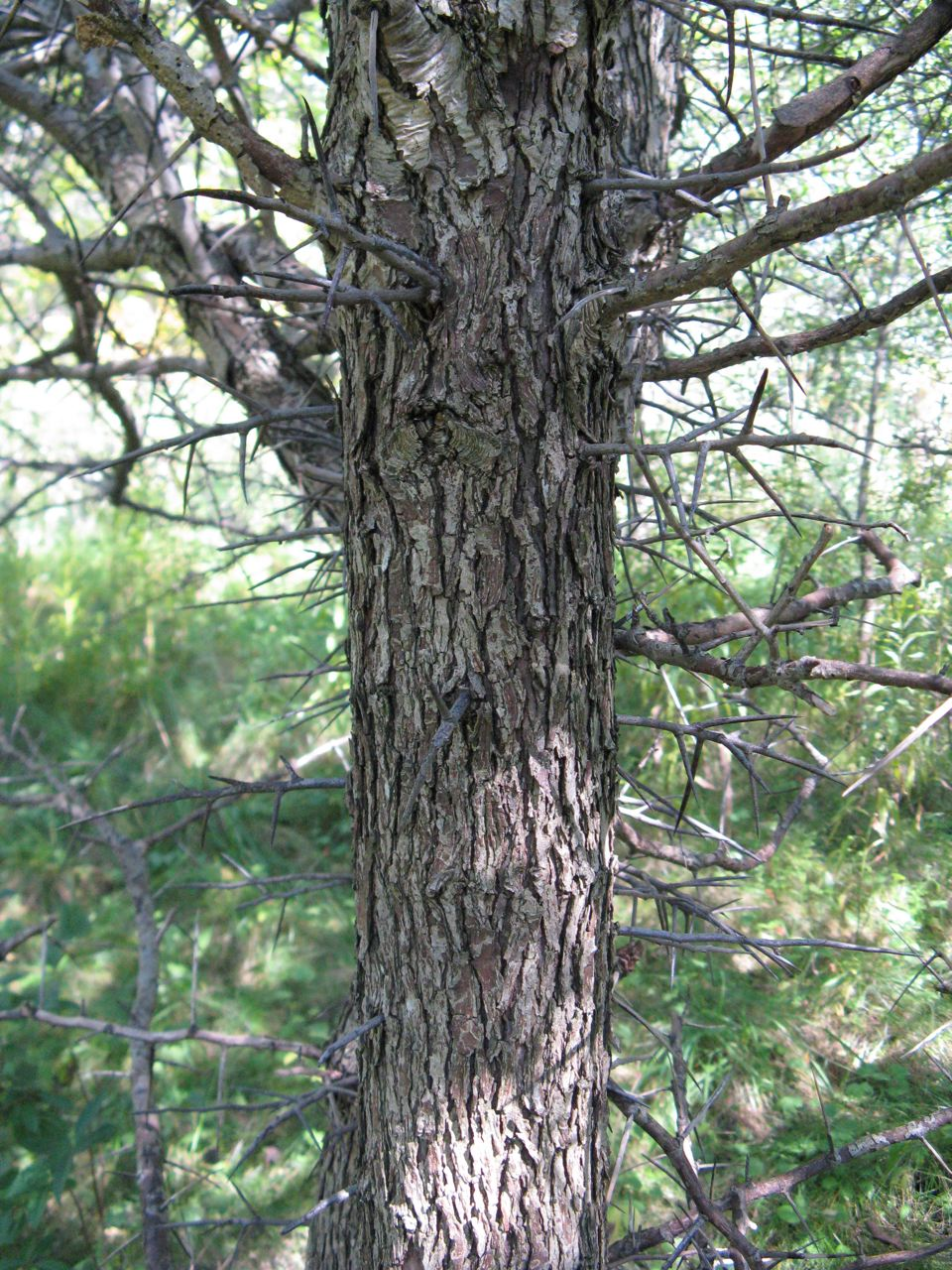
Branched thorns on the trunk

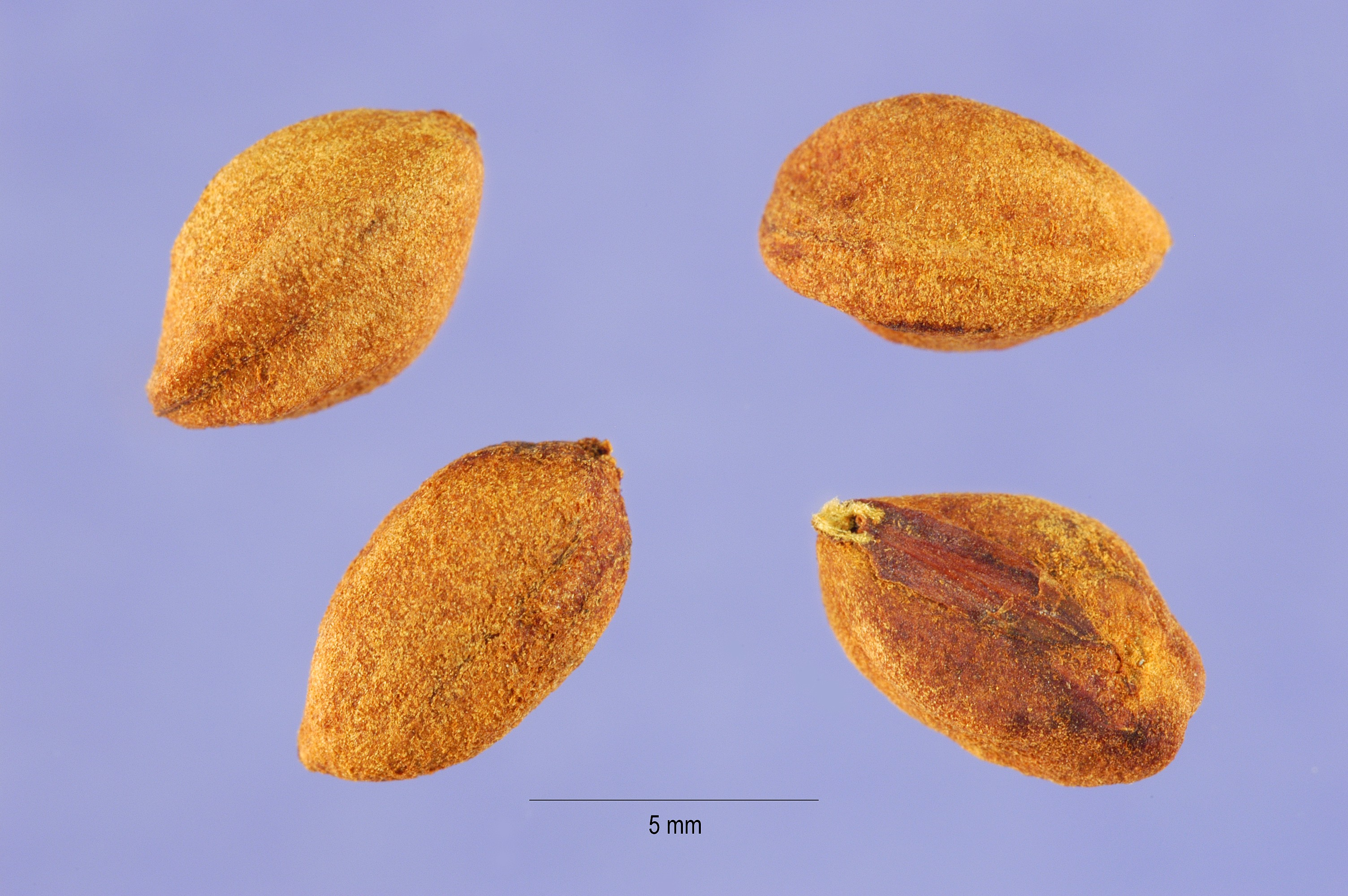
Seeds

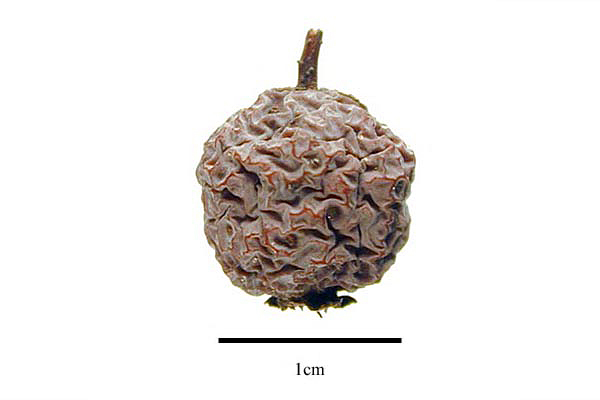
Preserved fruit

== See also ==
- List of hawthorn species with yellow fruit
- Crataegus × lavalleei
