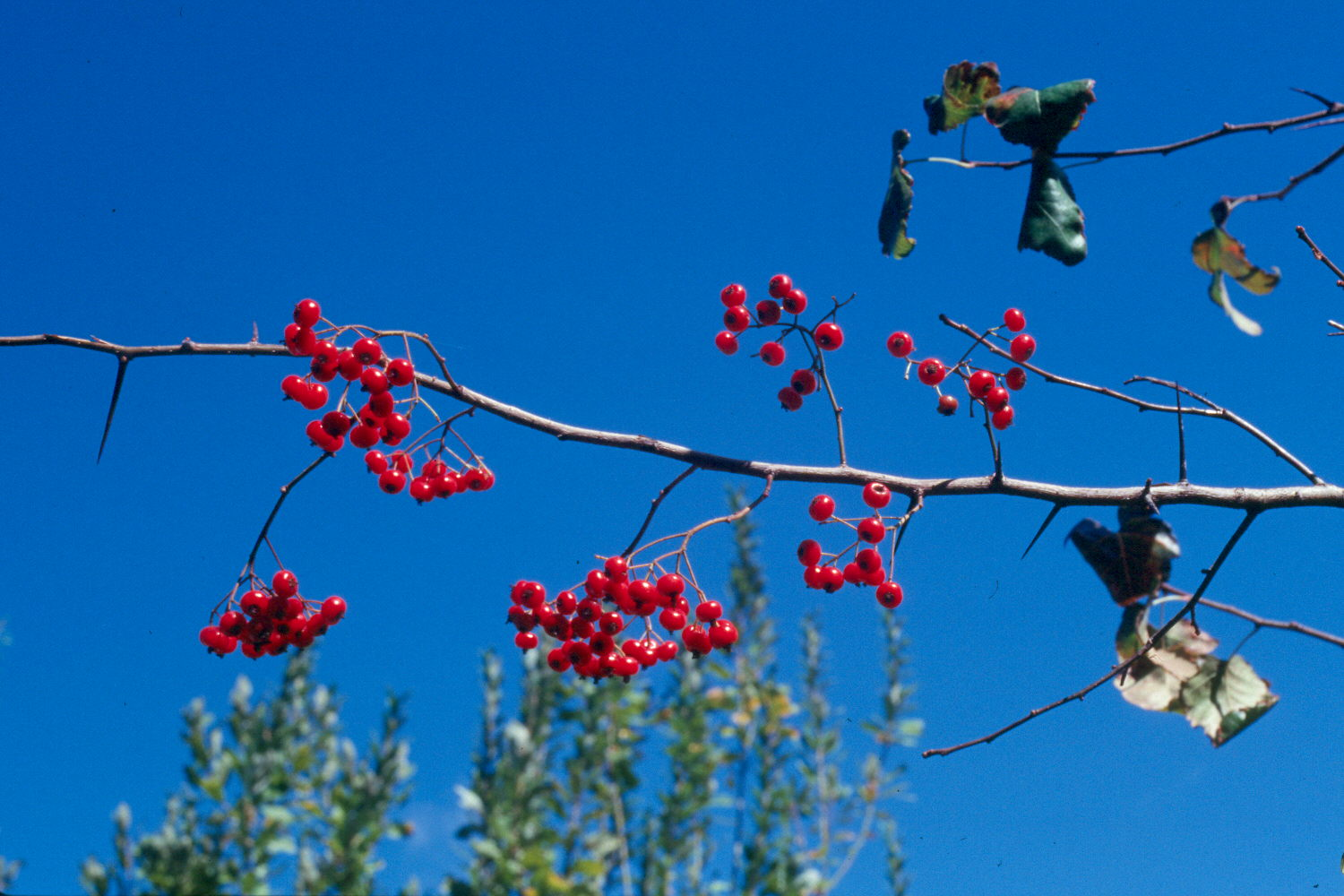

Conservation status
- Least Concern (IUCN 3.1)

Scientific classification
- Kingdom: Plantae
- Clade: Tracheophytes
- Clade: Angiosperms
- Clade: Eudicots
- Clade: Rosids
- Order: Rosales
- Family: Rosaceae
- Genus: Crataegus
- Species: C. phaenopyrum

Binomial name
- Crataegus phaenopyrum Borkh.

= Crataegus phaenopyrum =

Species of hawthorn

Crataegus phaenopyrum is a species of hawthorn commonly known as Washington hawthorn or Washington thorn. It is widely grown as an ornamental plant, and can reach 10 m (about 32 feet) in height. The small red berry-like fruit grow closely together in large clusters and are food for squirrels and birds. They have a mild flavor and can be eaten raw or cooked. As with other species of hawthorn, the wood is hard and can be used to make tools.

The fruit is edible and can be made into jelly or crushed to make tea. The species is native to the mid-eastern United States.
