= Socialis =

Socialis may refer to:

- Blechnum sociale, a species of fern in the family Blechnaceae sometimes incorrectly known as Blechnum socialis
- Drapetisca socialis, a species of spider belonging to the family Linyphiidae
- Ledebouria socialis, a species of bulbous perennial plant in the family Asparagaceae
- Microtus socialis, a species of rodent in the family Cricetidae
- Pluvianellus socialis, a rare and unique wader
- Sollicitudo rei socialis, an encyclical written by Pope John Paul II on 30 December 1987
- Styrax pentlandianus, synonym Styrax socialis, a species of flowering plant in the family Styracaceae
