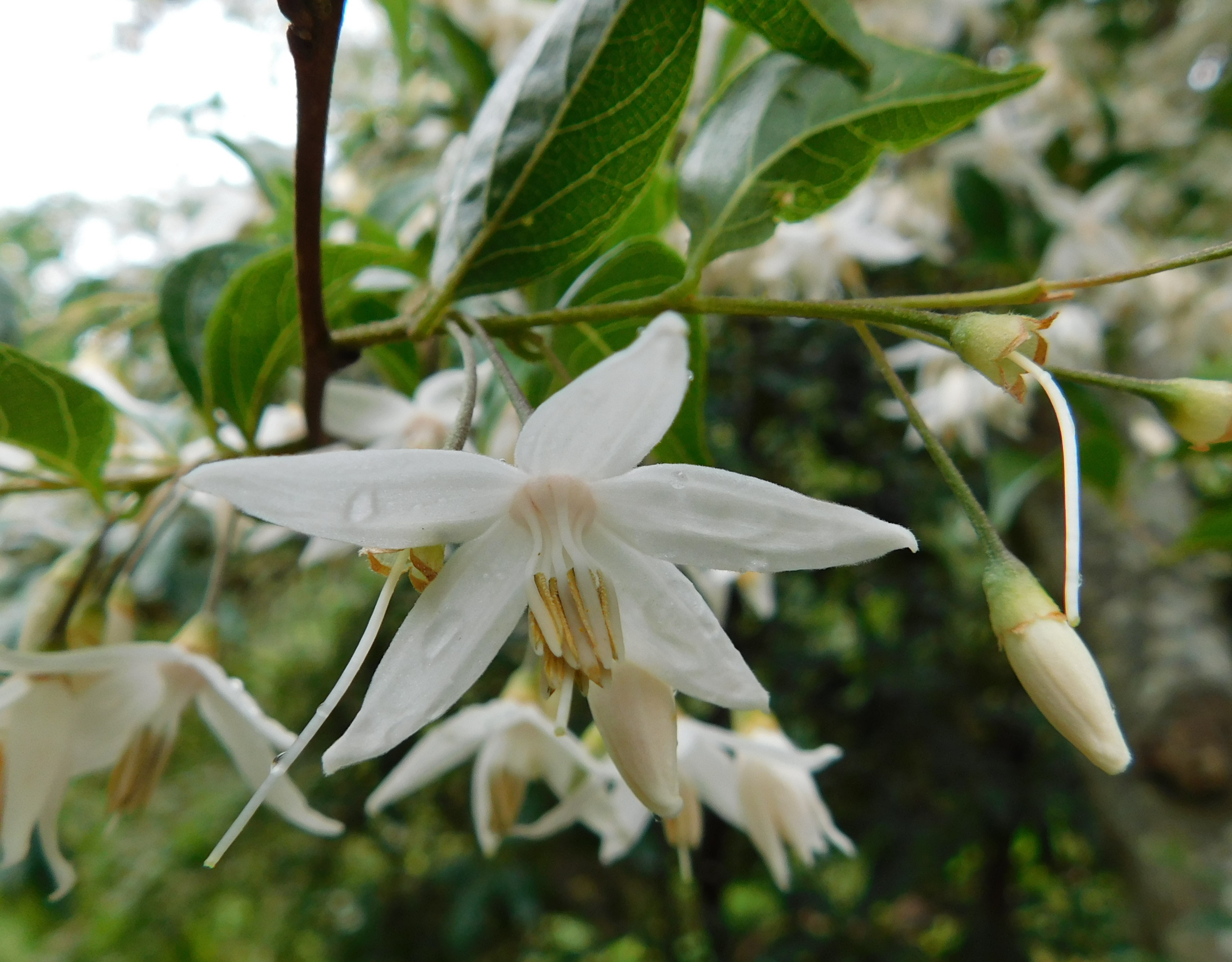
- Flower and buds
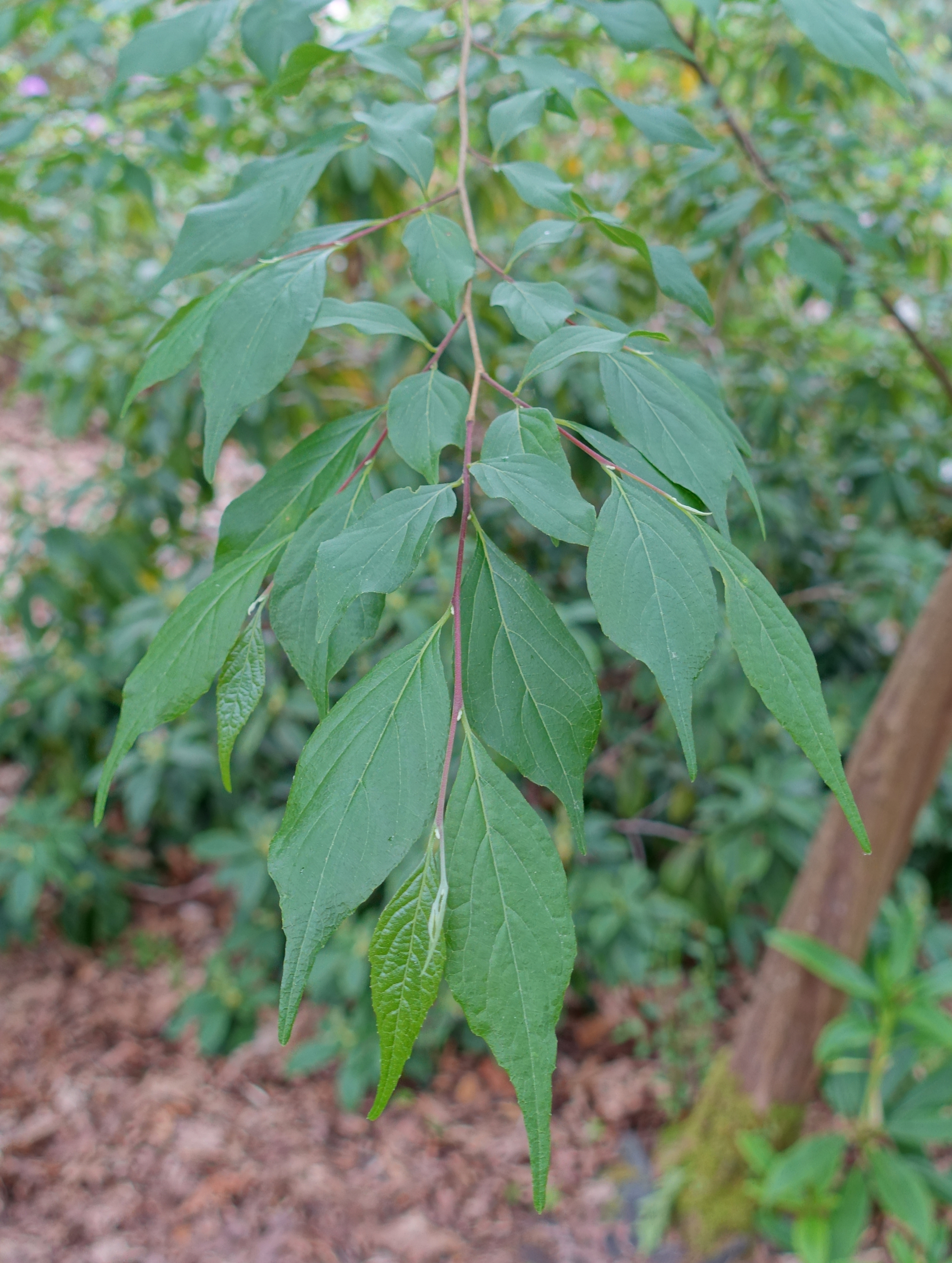
- Leaves

Scientific classification
- Kingdom: Plantae
- Clade: Tracheophytes
- Clade: Angiosperms
- Clade: Eudicots
- Clade: Asterids
- Order: Ericales
- Family: Styracaceae
- Genus: Styrax
- Species: S. formosanus

Binomial name
- Styrax formosanus Matsum.

Synonyms
- Styrax funkikensis K.Mori; Styrax henryi Perkins; Styrax henryi var. microcalyx Perkins; Styrax suzukii K.Mori

= Styrax formosanus =

Species of plant

Styrax formosanus, the Taiwanese snowbell, is a species of flowering plant in the family Styracaceae, native to southeastern China, and Taiwan. Flora of China calls it a shrub; it is usually a small tree. Similar to its close relative Styrax japonicus, it blooms in profusion in April and May with scented white flowers. It is available from commercial suppliers.

== Subtaxa ==
The following varieties are accepted:

- Styrax formosanus var. formosanus – entire range
- Styrax formosanus var. hirtus S.M.Hwang – southeastern China
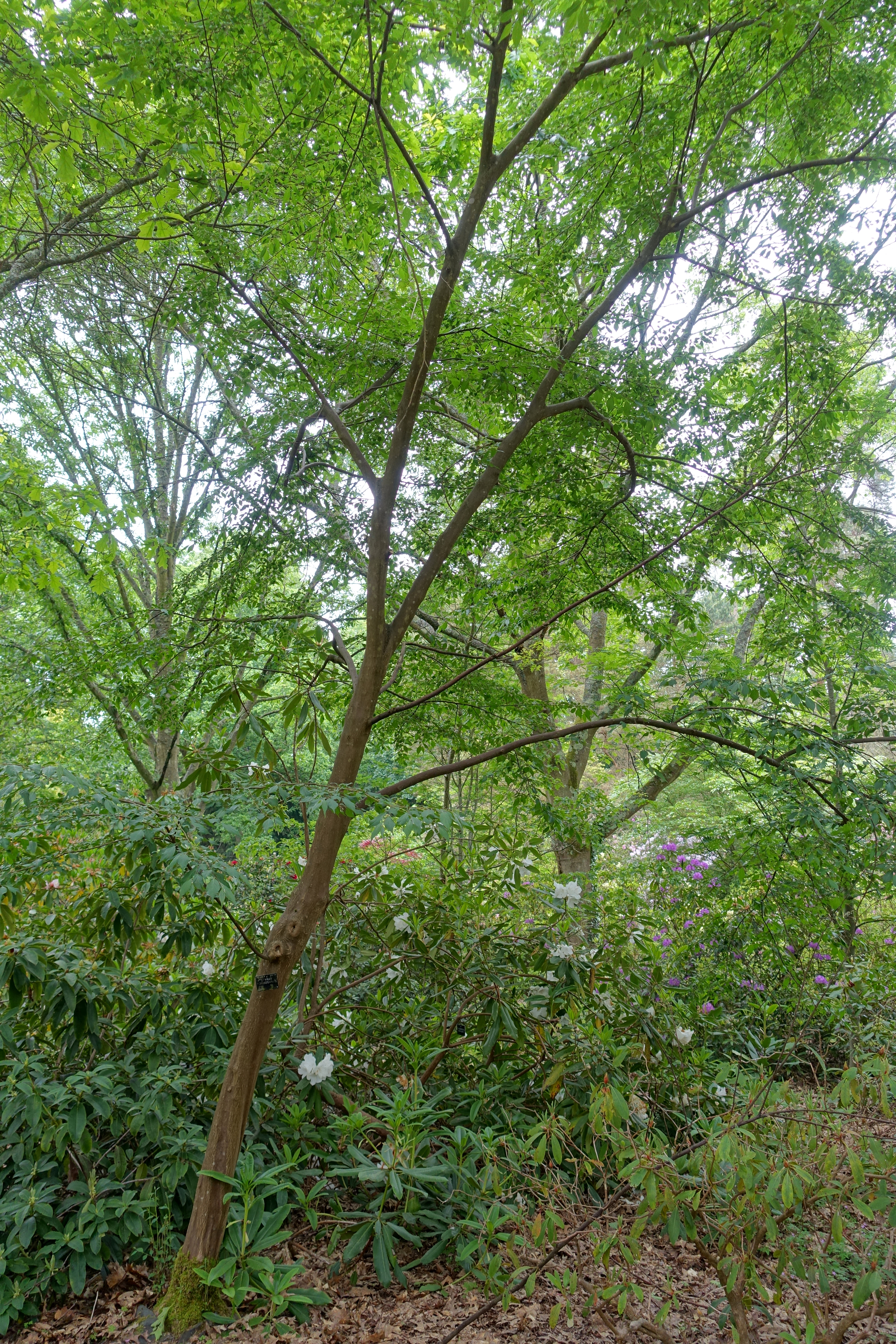
Habit
