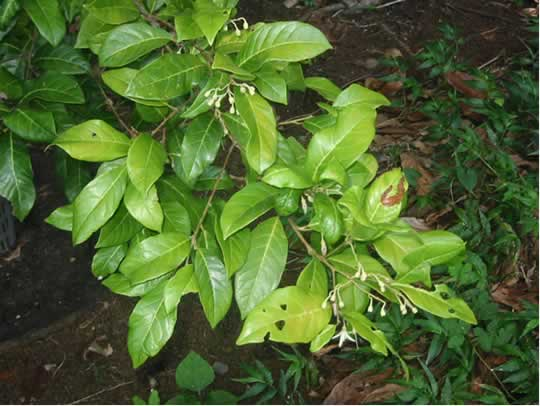

Conservation status
- Critically Endangered (IUCN 2.3)

Scientific classification
- Kingdom: Plantae
- Clade: Tracheophytes
- Clade: Angiosperms
- Clade: Eudicots
- Clade: Asterids
- Order: Ericales
- Family: Styracaceae
- Genus: Styrax
- Species: S. portoricensis

Binomial name
- Styrax portoricensis Krug & Urban

= Styrax portoricensis =

Species of plant

Styrax portoricensis, locally known as palo de jazmin, is a species of flowering plant in the family Styracaceae. It is endemic to Puerto Rico. It is one of the rarest endemic trees of Puerto Rico and is known to occur only in the northeastern Luquillo Mountains (Sierra de Luquillo) and the north-central Cayey Mountains (Sierra de Cayey).

== Description ==
Palo de jazmín is an evergreen tree that can reach 65 feet (20 meters) in height. It is recognized by star-shaped hairs on twigs, veins of lower leaf surfaces, branches of flower clusters, flowers and fruits; elliptically shaped leaves, 2 ¾ to 4 ¾ inches (6.9 to 12 centimeters) long and 1 ¼ to 2 inches (3 to 5 centimeters) wide, with six to seven ½ inch (1.2 centimeter) star-shaped whitish flowers drooping on short curved stalks. It has pointed gray-green fruit with cup-shaped outer leaves (calyces) for protection. It flowers in September, and October; fruits in April.

== Distribution ==
It is very rare in Luquillo and Cayey mountains; El Yunque National Forest and Carite State Forest.

== Threats ==
Currently listed under section (4) (C) 2 of the Endangered Species Act of 1973 with a classification of Endangered on the list of Endangered or Threatened Wildlife and Plants (50 CFR 17.11 – 17.12).
