= Styrax foveolaria =

Conservation status
- Vulnerable (IUCN 2.3)

Scientific classification
- Kingdom: Plantae
- Clade: Tracheophytes
- Clade: Angiosperms
- Clade: Eudicots
- Clade: Asterids
- Order: Ericales
- Family: Styracaceae
- Genus: Styrax
- Species: S. foveolaria

Binomial name
- Styrax foveolaria Perk.

Species of tree

Styrax foveolaria is a species of tree in the family Styracaceae. It is native to Peru and Ecuador. It has been classified by the IUCN as a vulnerable species.
