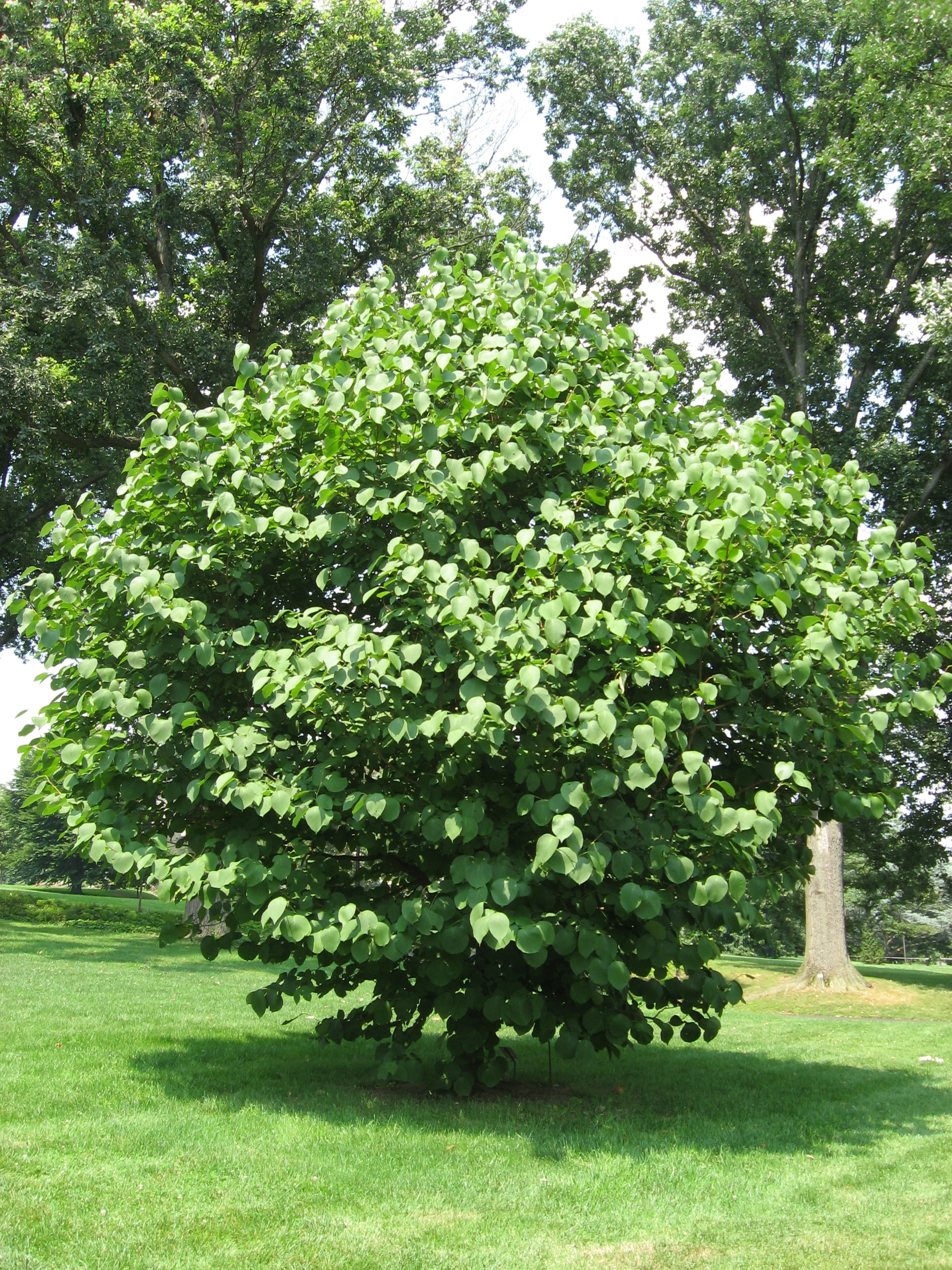

Scientific classification
- Kingdom: Plantae
- Clade: Tracheophytes
- Clade: Angiosperms
- Clade: Eudicots
- Clade: Asterids
- Order: Ericales
- Family: Styracaceae
- Genus: Styrax
- Species: S. obassia

Binomial name
- Styrax obassia Siebold & Zucc.

= Styrax obassia =

Species of flowering plant

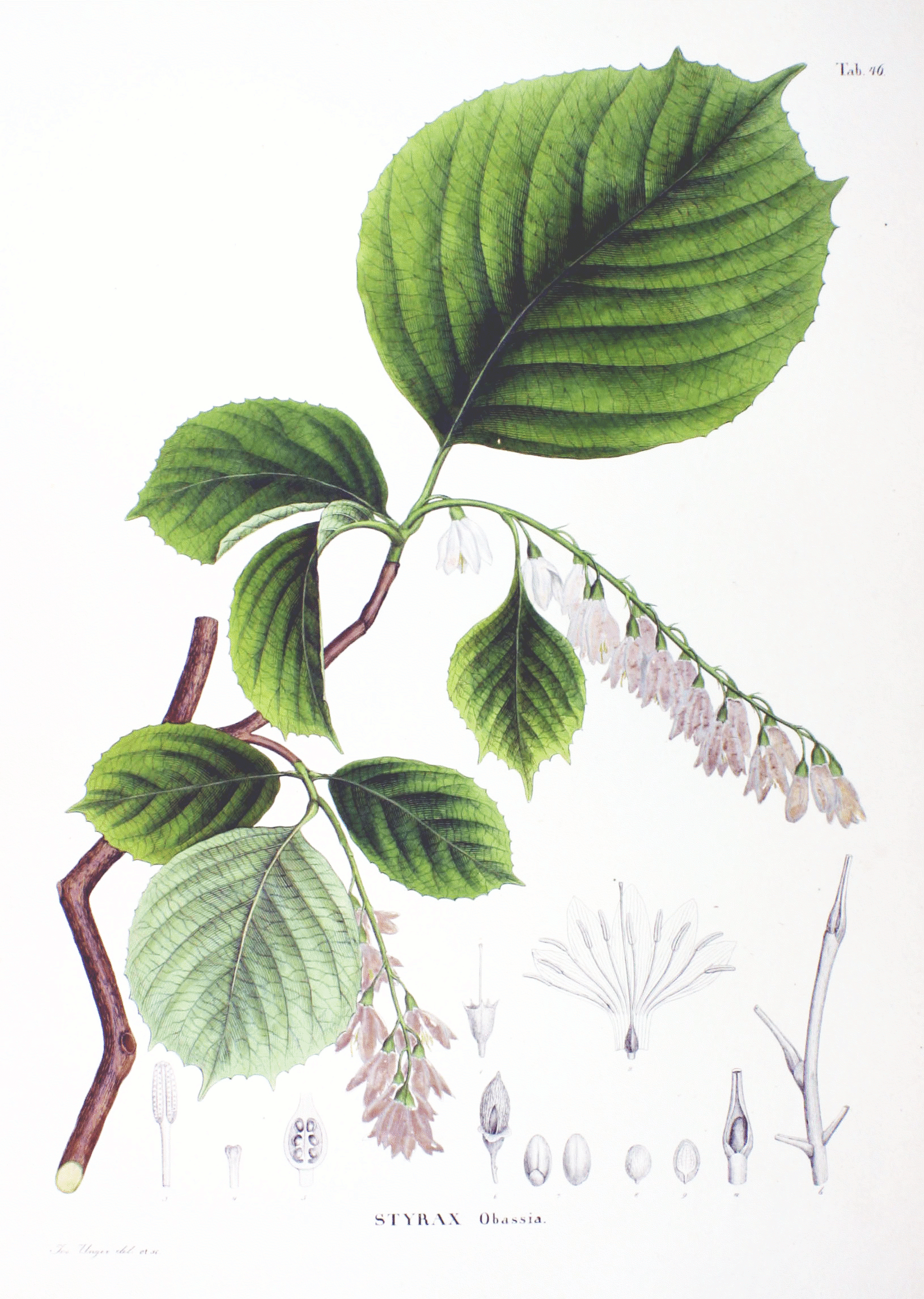
Illustration from Philipp Franz von Siebold's Flora Japonica

Styrax obassia is a species of flowering plant in the family Styracaceae. It is native to eastern China, Korea, and Japan (Hokkaido).

== Taxonomy ==
The name of the plant is sometimes spelled Styrax obassis, but the original spelling is obassia. In the history of botany, different people have used all three grammatical genders for the genus Styrax, and reasonable arguments could be made for treating it as neuter, feminine, or masculine, although it has been recommended that masculine gender should be used.

== Description ==
Styrax obassia is a small tree or shrub, 10–14 m (33–46 ft) tall.

== Cultivation ==
Styrax obassia is cultivated as an ornamental plant in gardens.

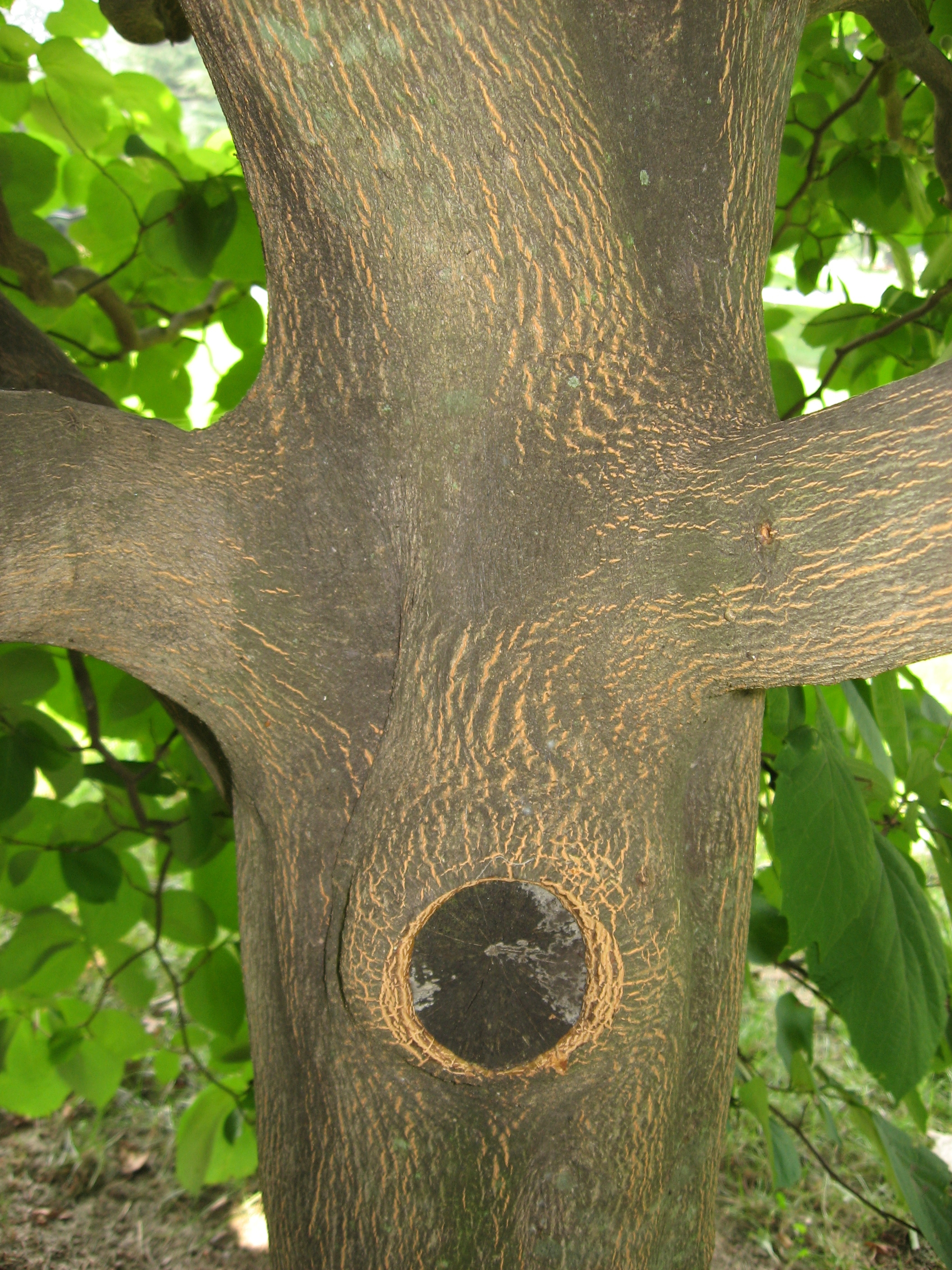
Closeup of bark

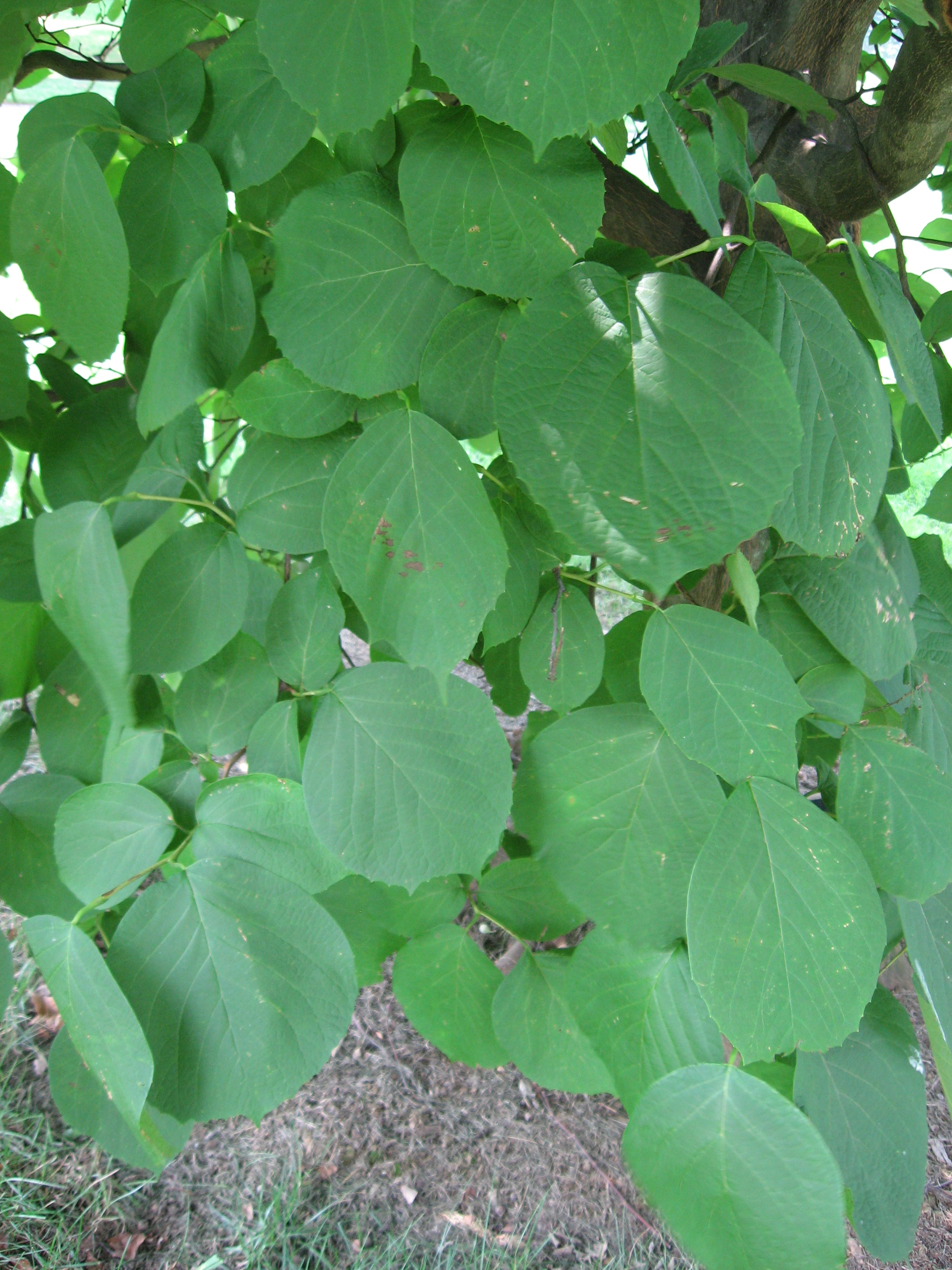
Closeup of leaves

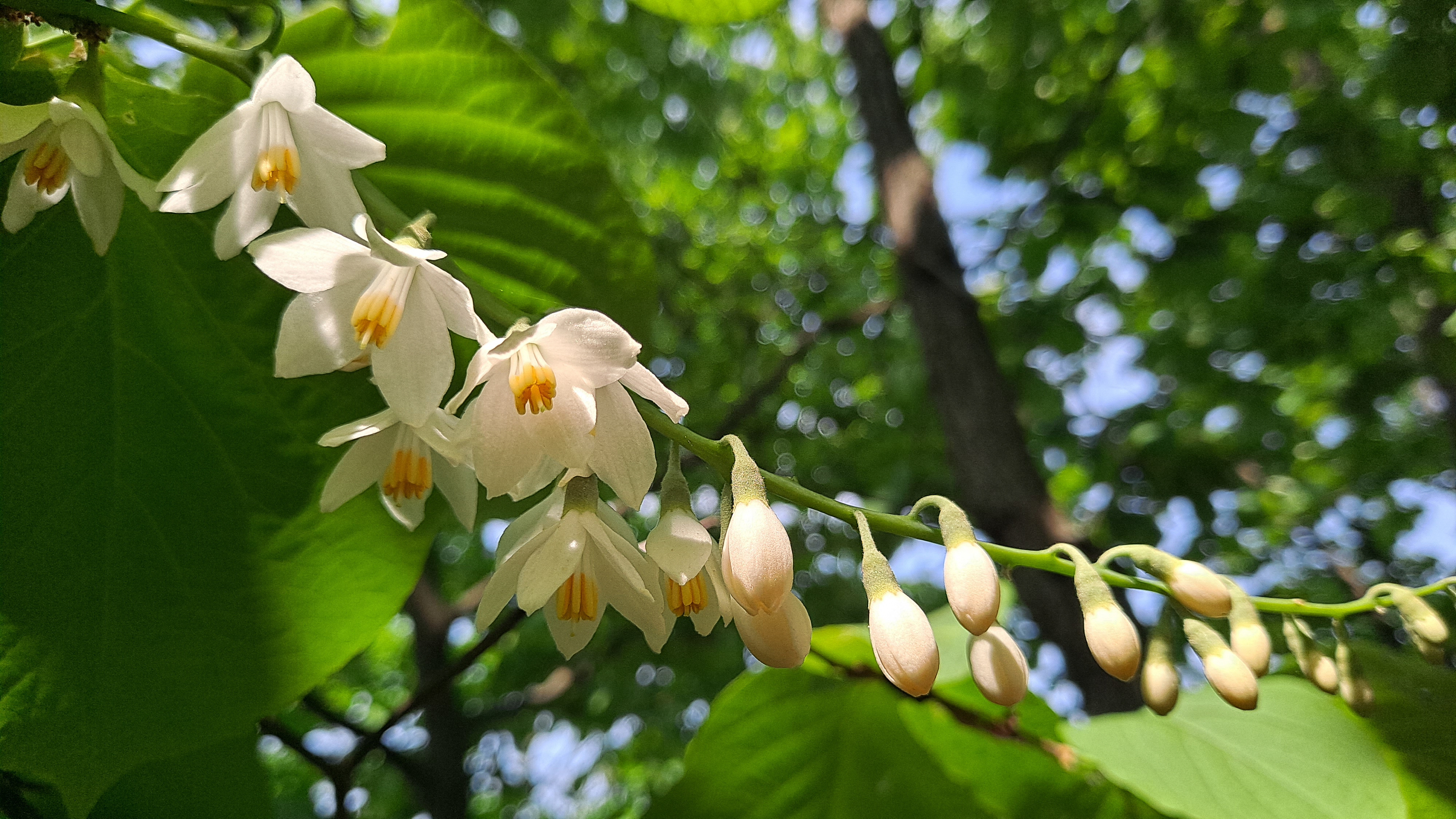
Closeup of flowers
