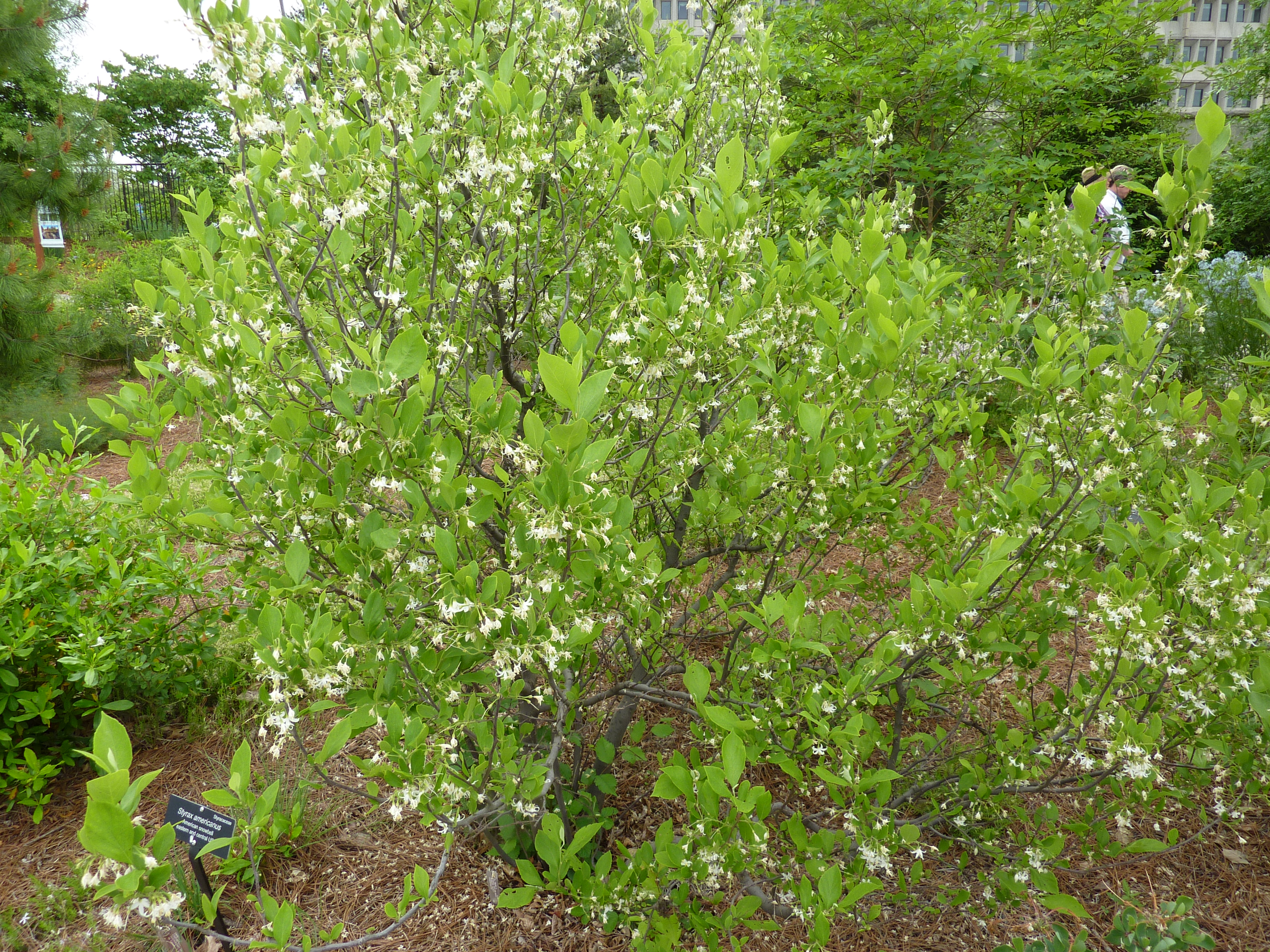

Conservation status
- Least Concern (IUCN 3.1)

Scientific classification
- Kingdom: Plantae
- Clade: Tracheophytes
- Clade: Angiosperms
- Clade: Eudicots
- Clade: Asterids
- Order: Ericales
- Family: Styracaceae
- Genus: Styrax
- Species: S. americanus

Binomial name
- Styrax americanus Lam.

Synonyms
- S. pulverulentus Michaux

= Styrax americanus =

Species of flowering plant

Styrax americanus, the American snowbell, is a plant species native to the southeastern United States and the Ohio Valley. It has been reported from Texas and Florida to Virginia and Missouri. It generally grows in swamps and on floodplains and in other wet locations.

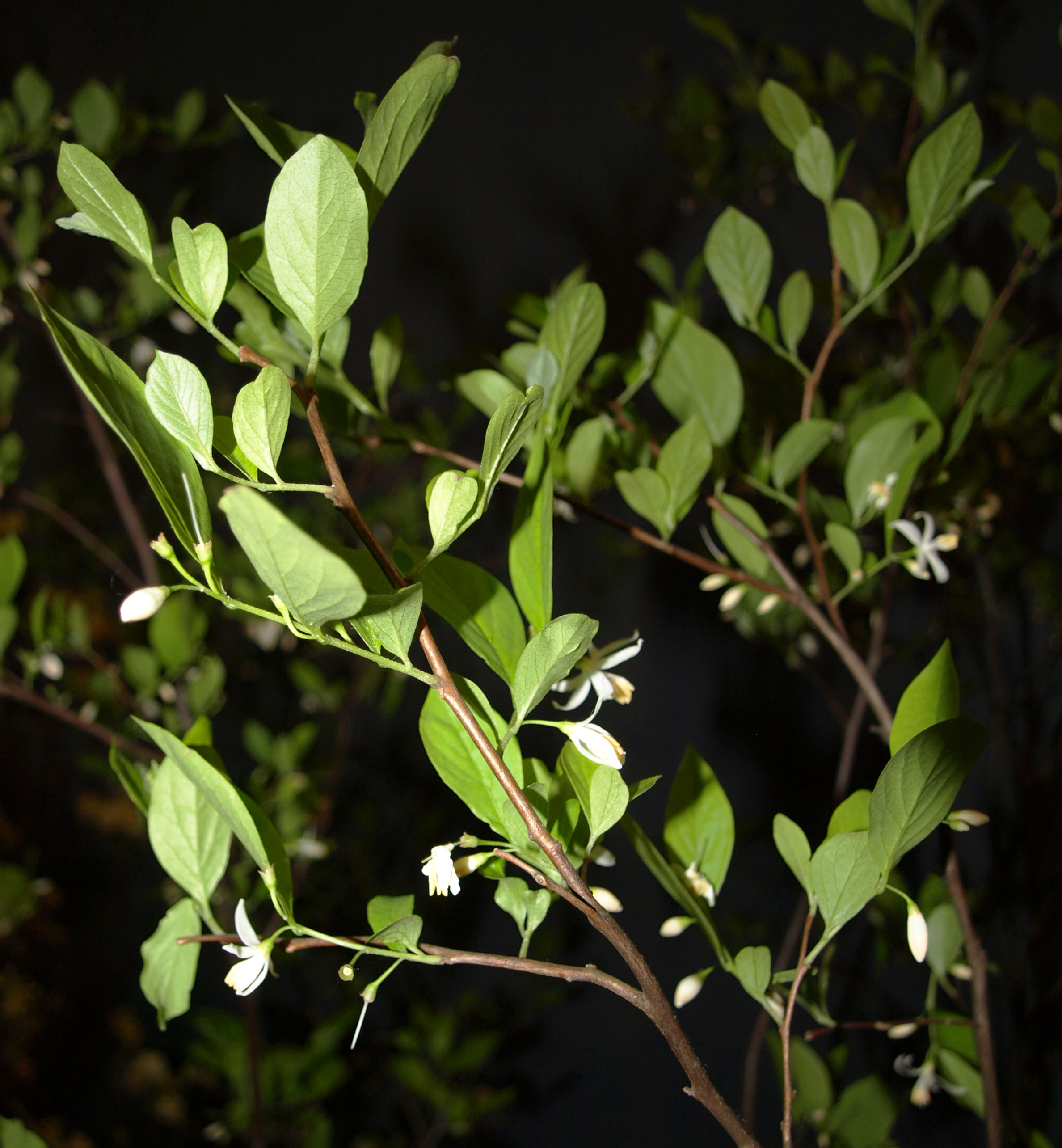
Styrax americanus is native to the eastern United States

Styrax americanus is a shrub or small tree up to 5 m (17 feet) tall. Leaves are elliptic to ovate, up to 10 cm (4 inches) long. Flowers are borne in the axils of some of the leaves.

Two varieties of this species exist:

- Styrax americanus var. americanus (American snowbell) common to swamp forests and wet habitats ranging from West Virginia south to Florida and west to Texas and Missouri.
- Styrax americanus var. pulverulentus (downy American snowbell) common to wet pine flatwoods ranging from South Carolina south to Florida and west to Texas and Missouri.
