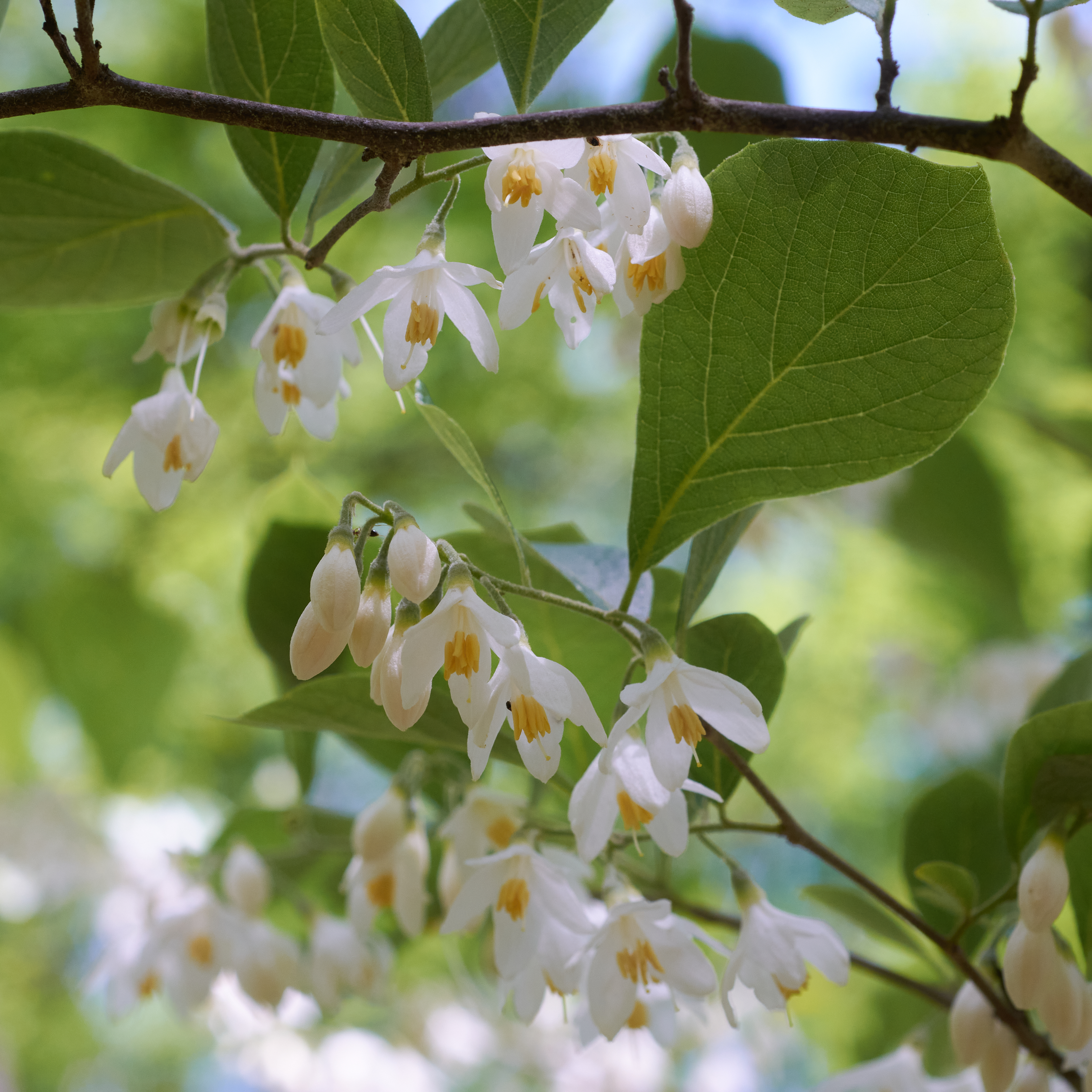

Conservation status
- Least Concern (IUCN 3.1)

Scientific classification
- Kingdom: Plantae
- Clade: Tracheophytes
- Clade: Angiosperms
- Clade: Eudicots
- Clade: Asterids
- Order: Ericales
- Family: Styracaceae
- Genus: Styrax
- Species: S. grandifolius

Binomial name
- Styrax grandifolius Aiton.

= Styrax grandifolius =

Species of flowering plant

Styrax grandifolius, the bigleaf snowbell or bigleaf styrax, is a plant species native to the southeastern United States, ranging from Virginia south to Florida and west to Texas and Missouri. The plant grows as a deciduous shrub or tree up to 6 metres (20 ft) high, and is most commonly found in upland forests of the southeast's piedmont. As the specific epithet suggests, the species has larger leaves than sympatric Styracaceae, with alternate, obovate leaves up to 14 cm long and 10 cm wide that are densely pubescent underneath. Flowers are borne during early summer in racemes containing up to 20 flowers.

== Description ==
The bigleaf snowbell is a deciduous shrub or tree up to 6 m (20 ft) high. With dark and streaky bark, and as the specific epithet suggests, the species has larger leaves than sympatric Styracaceae, with alternate, obovate leaves up to 14 cm long and 10 cm wide that are densely pubescent underneath. This causes the underside of the leaf to appear whitish grey, with a dark green topside. These simple leaves are broadly obovate to suborbicular in shape with broadly tapered to rounded bases, with petioles from 2–10 mm. long.

Styrax grandifolius has flowers that grow in larger clusters than other species in its genus, having as many as 20 flowers in a raceme. Flowers are borne during early summer and are white flower. Flowers are composed of 5 fused sepals, 5 petals that are fused at the based and freed above. There are 10 stamens tipped with yellow or orangish anthers, with a partly inferior ovary.

Nut-like fruits, 7–9 mm in diameter, known as drupes are produced from June to October. The brownish green fruit contains up to 3 seeds.

These plants are very similar in appearance to the American snowbell (Styrax americanus), the American snowbell has smaller leaves and fewer flowers.

== Etymology ==
The specific epithet (grandifolius) is derived from the Latin words grandis meaning "large" and folium meaning "leaf".

== Uses ==
Bigleaf snowbell can be easily propagated via leaf cutting. Styrax grandifolius can be used as an ornamental plant due to its showy and copious flowers, though its use ornamentally is limited, outside of botanical gardens.

== Taxonomy ==
The Styrax genus was original described by Linnaeus in 1753. William Aiton a Scottish botanist described Styrax grandifolius in 1789. There are 130 different members of the Styrax genus mostly from Eastern and Southeast Asia, and there are five species from North America. This genus is made up of small to medium-sized trees and large shrubs. Some authors use the synonym Styrax grandifolia for the same plant.

Styrax grandifolius can often be confused with Styrax americanus, because they have similar ranges and appearance. A notable difference being a difference in leaf size, Styrax grandifolius has larger leaves than Styrax americanus.

== Distribution and habitat ==
Styrax grandifoliusis a plant species native to the southeastern United States, ranging from Virginia south to Florida and west to Texas and Missouri. and is most commonly found in upland forests of the southeast piedmont. Bigleaf snowbells grow in shaded areas, open mesic upland forests, or in the vicinity of floodplains. often on well- drained slopes.

These plants can grow in many different kinds of soil conditions, such as rocky clay, sandy soil on hillsides, to gravelly soil. they also have broad pH tolerance, being able to grow in soil with a pH from 5-7, and often found in a wide elevation range from as low as approximately 90 ft. to as high as 1,300 ft. Despite Styrax grandifolius being able to grow in several different soil types, conditions, and deal with moderate disturbance as well as some types of forest fires. They have a low tolerance for saturated soil and direct sunlight, which is why its often found as an under story plant.

== Ecology ==
Styrax grandifolius occurs in many different communities including mixed-mesic or upland deciduous forests in the southeastern United States. Bigleaf snowbell attracts several different pollinators, the most common of which are honeybees and bumblebees. Other pollinators also will seek out the Bigleaf snowbell such as, swallowtail butterflies, syrphid flies, sphingid moths, wasps, and solitary bees.

== Protection status & potential threats ==
Styrax grandifolius is considered to be secure worldwide by the Nature Conservancy. However, in the United States the Styrax grandifolius status varies from state to state. In Illinois and Indiana bigleaf snow bell is considered endangered, while in Virginia it is only on the watch list, and in Ohio it is presumed extricated. This understory shrub is at some risk from some forest management methods that clear the forest canopy, such as clear cutting or even selective logging of larger trees. Because, Styrax grandifolius is intolerant to direct sun exposure. Land development is another threat, while Styrax grandifolius can withstand some damage from landscaping activities, compacted soil negatively impacts bigleaf snowbell. Aggressive and native and invasive species, such as Japanese honeysuckle (Lonicera japonica) and Multiflora rose (Rosa multiflora) can negatively impact bigleaf snowbell. In the south, kudzu (Pueraria lobata) can pose a treat to Styrax grandifolius. Bigleaf snowbells are also susceptible to extreme cold and drought, however this usually only occurs in population that appear at the extreme margin of its range, for example, at higher elevations in South Carolina Bigleaf snowbell can be susceptible to flower bud freeze off in early spring.
