= Styrax vilcabambae =

Conservation status
- Vulnerable (IUCN 2.3)

Scientific classification
- Kingdom: Plantae
- Clade: Tracheophytes
- Clade: Angiosperms
- Clade: Eudicots
- Clade: Asterids
- Order: Ericales
- Family: Styracaceae
- Genus: Styrax
- Species: S. vilcabambae

Binomial name
- Styrax vilcabambae (D.R.Simpson) B.Walln.

Species of plant

Styrax vilcabambae (syn. Pamphilia vilcabambae D.R.Simpson) is a species of flowering plant found in the genus Styrax and the family Styracaceae. It is endemic to Peru.
