= Styrax cordatus =

Scientific classification
- Kingdom: Plantae
- Clade: Tracheophytes
- Clade: Angiosperms
- Clade: Eudicots
- Clade: Asterids
- Order: Ericales
- Family: Styracaceae
- Genus: Styrax
- Species: S. cordatus

Binomial name
- Styrax cordatus (Ruiz & Pav.) A. DC.

Synonyms
- Foveolaria cordata Ruiz & Pav.; Foveolaria ovata Ruiz & Pav.; Strigilia cordata DC.; Styrax andinus Steyerm.; Styrax argyrophyllus Perkins; Styrax mathewsii Perkins; Styrax ovatus (Ruiz & Pav.) A. DC.

Species of plant

Styrax cordatus is a species of plant in the family Styracaceae. It is native to Peru and Ecuador.
