= Styrax peruvianus =

Conservation status
- Least Concern (IUCN 3.1)

Scientific classification
- Kingdom: Plantae
- Clade: Tracheophytes
- Clade: Angiosperms
- Clade: Eudicots
- Clade: Asterids
- Order: Ericales
- Family: Styracaceae
- Genus: Styrax
- Species: S. peruvianus

Binomial name
- Styrax peruvianus Zahlbr.

Species of tree

Styrax peruvianus is a species of tree in the family Styracaceae. It is found from Costa Rica south to Peru. It has been classified by the IUCN as a vulnerable species.
