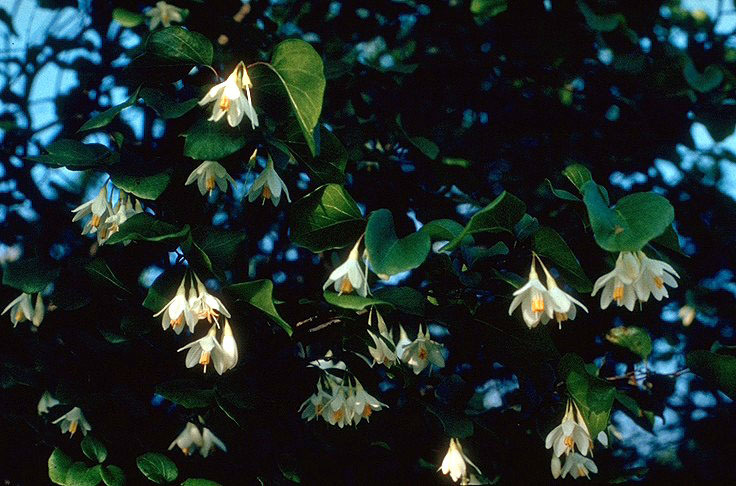

Conservation status
- Vulnerable (NatureServe)

Scientific classification
- Kingdom: Plantae
- Clade: Tracheophytes
- Clade: Angiosperms
- Clade: Eudicots
- Clade: Asterids
- Order: Ericales
- Family: Styracaceae
- Genus: Styrax
- Species: S. platanifolius

Binomial name
- Styrax platanifolius Engelm.

= Styrax platanifolius =

Species of flowering plant

The genus Styrax has an estimated 120 species in eastern Asia, the New World, and the Mediterranean region. Styrax platanifolius is a species of flowering plant in the family Styracaceae known by the common name sycamoreleaf snowbell or "Texas Snowbell". It is native to northeastern Mexico in the states of Coahuila, Nuevo León, and Tamaulipas and the US state of Texas, especially on the Edwards Plateau. Styrax flowering season is estimated to be during the months of April-May. Its fruiting season has been observed to be during July-September. Styrax platanifolius thrive in more of a subhumid climate (40-70 cm mean annual precipitation, significant summer rain).

== Description ==
This is a flowering shrub which can grow to 6 meters. The leaves are variable in shape, generally oval with smooth, toothed, or lobed edges, and measuring 4.5 to 12 centimeters in length. The inflorescence is a solitary flower or cluster of up to 7. The bell-shaped white flower is 1 or 2 centimeters long. The fruit is a hairy, spherical capsule about a centimeter long.

== Taxonomy ==
There are five subspecies of this plant. Some were formerly considered species, but genetic analysis suggests they are more closely related and should be treated as subtaxa of one species. The subspecies are mostly characterized on the basis of the amount and arrangement of hairs on the leaves and other parts. The Texas Snowbell is characterized mostly by its shape. The petals of the shrub are white and it hangs upside down. This shape resembles a bell and because of the color it gained the name “snowbell”.

=== Subspecies ===
- S. p. ssp. mollis - known from the Sierra Madre Oriental in Nuevo León and Tamaulipas in Mexico.
- S. p. ssp. platanifolius - once the most widespread subspecies and now quite rare.
- S. p. ssp. stellatus (hairy sycamoreleaf snowbell) - formerly S. stellatus, a rare subspecies found along the southern edge of the Edwards Plateau
- S. p. ssp. texanus (Texas snowbell) - formerly S. texana or S. texanus, rare and federally listed as an endangered species of the United States. There are about 22 populations remaining in the state of Texas.
- S. p. ssp. youngiae (Young's snowbell) - formerly S. youngiae, occurs in Coahuila and in the Davis Mountains of Texas. Two populations were recently discovered in eastern Jeff Davis County.
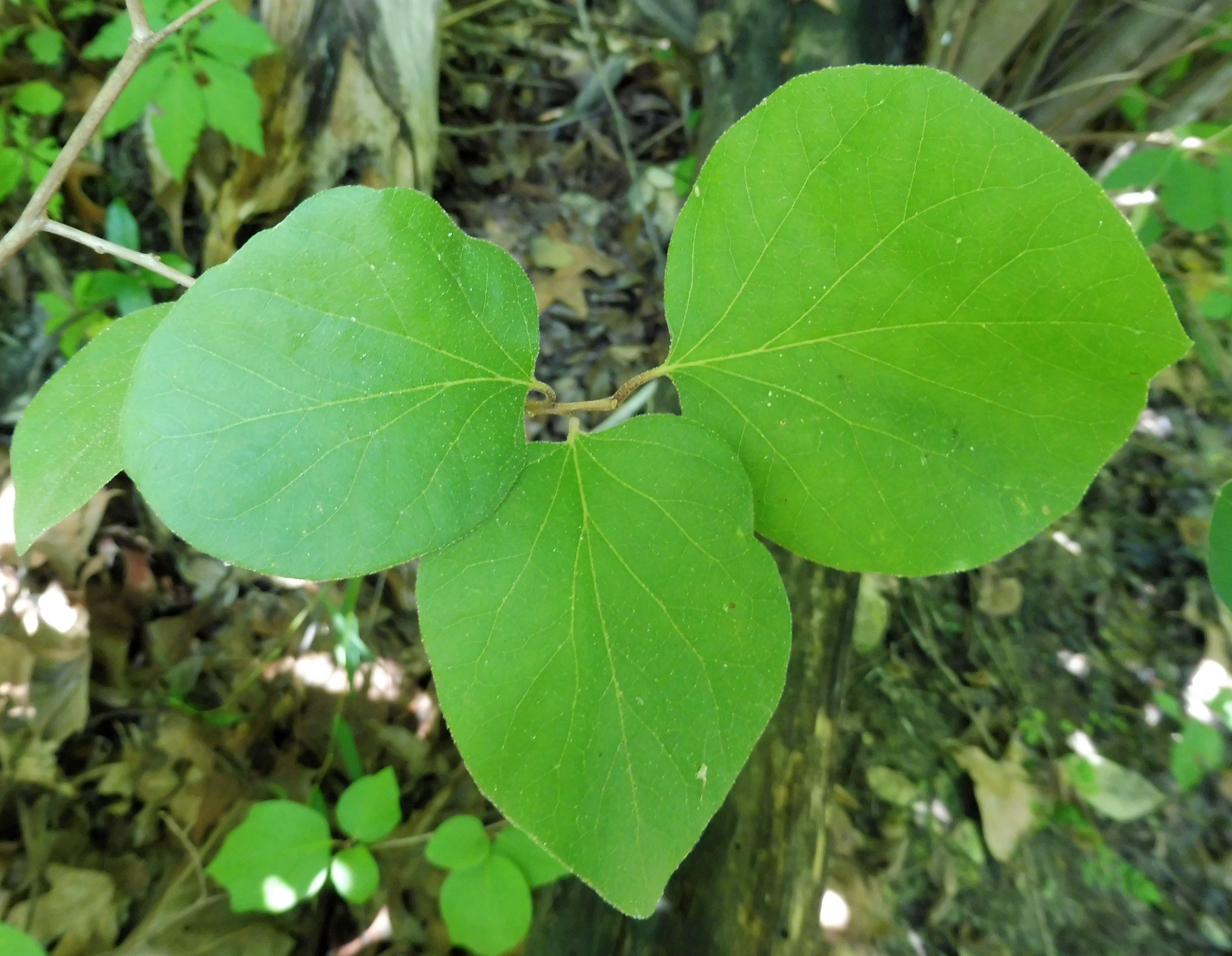
Leaves of ssp. stellatus have white stellate hairs

=== Conservation status ===
The texas snowbell is one of the most endangered plant species in Texas<Adams & Poole, 2011>. It can be found in the San Antonio Botanical Center . The lack of genetic variation found in the species disabled it from being able to withstand evolution which explains there are not many found today. Scientists are still trying to decide whether to keep the rare texas snowbells conserved in a safe space or to keep them in nature and allow natural selection take place to allow a new generation to emerge.
