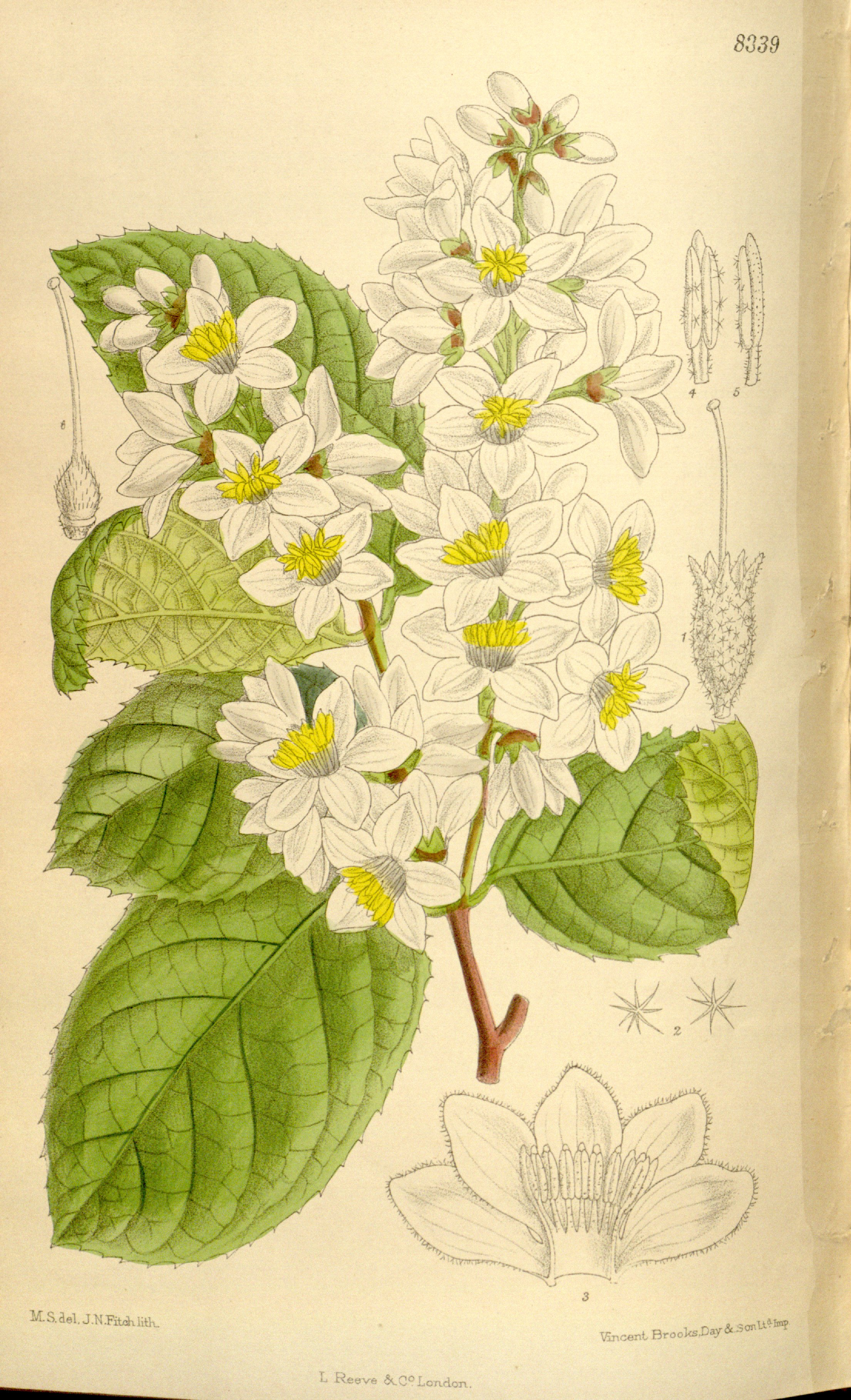
- S. hemsleyanus, Curtis's Botanical Magazine

Scientific classification
- Kingdom: Plantae
- Clade: Tracheophytes
- Clade: Angiosperms
- Clade: Eudicots
- Clade: Asterids
- Order: Ericales
- Family: Styracaceae
- Genus: Styrax
- Species: S. hemsleyanus

Binomial name
- Styrax hemsleyanus Diels

= Styrax hemsleyanus =

Species of flowering plant

Styrax hemsleyanus (老鸹铃), the Hemsley snowball, is a species of flowering plant in the family Styracaceae, native to central China. Growing to 12 m (39 ft) tall by 5 m (16 ft) broad, it is a conical deciduous tree with large rounded leaves, 12 cm (5 in) long, and clusters of cup-shaped flowers in early summer.

The plant has gained the Royal Horticultural Society's Award of Garden Merit.
