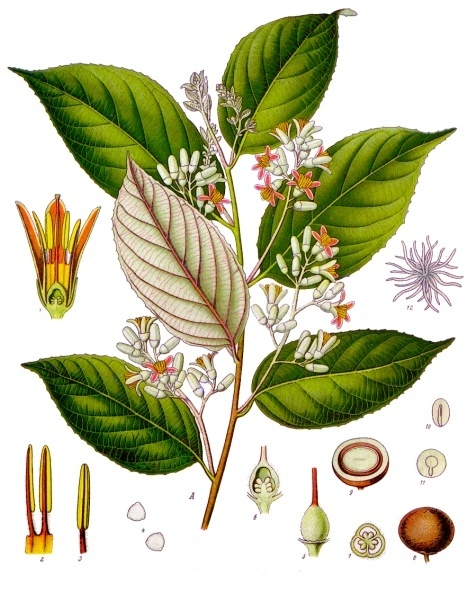

Scientific classification
- Kingdom: Plantae
- Clade: Tracheophytes
- Clade: Angiosperms
- Clade: Eudicots
- Clade: Asterids
- Order: Ericales
- Family: Styracaceae
- Genus: Styrax
- Species: S. benzoin

Binomial name
- Styrax benzoin Dryand.

= Styrax benzoin =

Species of tree

Styrax benzoin is a species of tree native to Indochina and western Malesia. Common names for the tree include gum benjamin tree, loban (in Arabic), kemenyan (in Indonesia and Malaysia), onycha, and Sumatra benzoin tree.

== Distribution ==
It is a common member of the forests of Sumatra, Indonesia, where it grows to about 12–30 meters in height. Styrax benzoin can live 70–100 years. It is unknown how it came to Sumatra. Scientists says styrax benzoin from Sumatra has the best quality.

The process of tapping and harvesting frankincense takes one year. The styrax benzoin tree trunk is cut slightly, so that the white styrax sap will appear from the skin. After 4–6 months of the styrax sap hardens on the tree trunks at which point the sap can be harvested.

The sap that has been harvested is not clean and is dried for 3 to 6 months to remove impurities. After the sap has dried, it is ready for export.

Incense trees grow in several countries in Southeast Asia, such as Malaysia, Laos, Vietnam and Indonesia. The tree can thrive in mountainous areas and cold temperatures with high rainfall. Styrax trees can also grow in lowland areas with hot temperatures but these do not produce good quality styrax sap.

== Cultivation ==
Styrax benzoin is cultivated as a main source of benzoin resin in Indonesia. It is also grown as an ornamental tree for shade in West Africa.

== See also ==
- Styrax — 'Uses of resin' section
