= Styrax suberifolius =

Scientific classification
- Kingdom: Plantae
- Clade: Tracheophytes
- Clade: Angiosperms
- Clade: Eudicots
- Clade: Asterids
- Order: Ericales
- Family: Styracaceae
- Genus: Styrax
- Species: S. suberifolius

Binomial name
- Styrax suberifolius Hook. & Arn.

Species of plant

Styrax suberifolius is a tree in the family Styracaceae. It is native to southern China, Taiwan, Vietnam, and Myanmar.

Styrax suberifolius is a tree about 4–20 m (13–66 ft) tall. It can have very large galls it forms under the influence of the samurai aphid (reported as Ceratoglyphina bambusae, but probably Ceratoglyphina styracicola). These can be very large, up to 10 cm long, housing up to 100,000–200,000 aphids. These aphids are social, with a distinct warrior caste.
