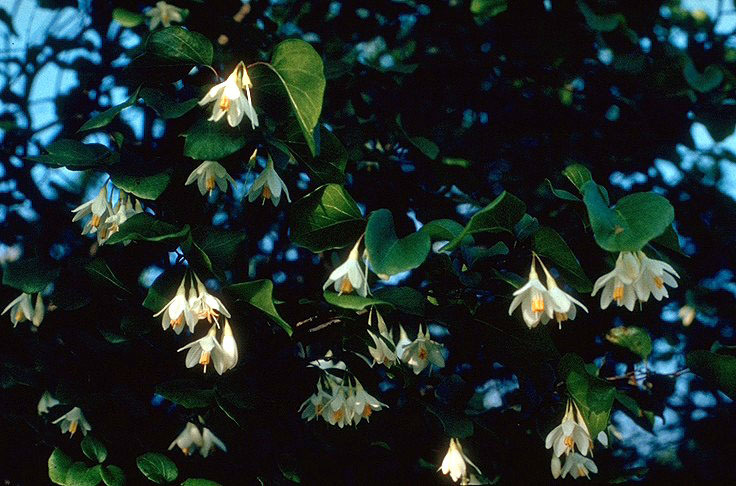
- Styrax platanifolius

Scientific classification
- Kingdom: Plantae
- Clade: Tracheophytes
- Clade: Angiosperms
- Clade: Eudicots
- Clade: Asterids
- Order: Ericales
- Family: Styracaceae
- Genus: Styrax; L.

Species
- About 130, see text

Synonyms
- Pamphilia Mart. ex A. DC.

= Styrax =

Genus of plants

Styrax (common names storax or snowbell) is a genus of about 130 species of large shrubs or small trees in the family Styracaceae, mostly native to warm temperate to tropical regions of the Northern Hemisphere, with the majority in eastern and southeastern Asia, but also crossing the equator in South America. The resin obtained from the tree is called benzoin or storax (not to be confused with the Liquidambar storax balsam), often used as a vanilla-like component in perfumery.

The genus Pamphilia, sometimes regarded as distinct, is now included within Styrax based on analysis of morphological and DNA sequence data. The spicebush (Lindera benzoin) is a different plant, in the family Lauraceae.

Styrax trees grow to 2–14 m tall, and have alternate, deciduous or evergreen simple ovate leaves 1–18 cm long and 2–10 cm broad. The flowers are pendulous, with a white 5–10-lobed corolla, produced 3–30 together on open or dense panicles 5–25 cm long. The fruit is an oblong dry drupe, smooth and lacking ribs or narrow wings, unlike the fruit of the related snowdrop trees (Halesia) and epaulette trees (Pterostyrax).

== Uses ==
=== Uses of resin ===
Benzoin resin, a dried exudation from pierced bark, is currently produced from various Styrax species native to Sumatra, Java, and Thailand. Commonly traded are the resins of S. tonkinensis (Siam benzoin), S. benzoin (Sumatra benzoin), and S. benzoides. The name benzoin is probably derived from Arabic lubān jāwī (لبان جاوي, "Javan frankincense); compare the obsolete terms gum benjamin and benjoin. This incidentally shows that the Arabs were aware of the origin of these resins, and that by the late Middle Ages at latest international trade in them was probably of major importance.

The chemical benzoin (2-hydroxy-2-phenylacetophenone), despite the apparent similarity of the name, is not contained in benzoin resin in measurable quantities. However, benzoin resin does contain small amounts of the hydrocarbon styrene, named however for Levant storax (from Liquidambar orientalis), from which it was first isolated, and not for the genus Styrax itself; industrially produced styrene is now used to produce polystyrene plastics, including Styrofoam.

==== History of sources ====
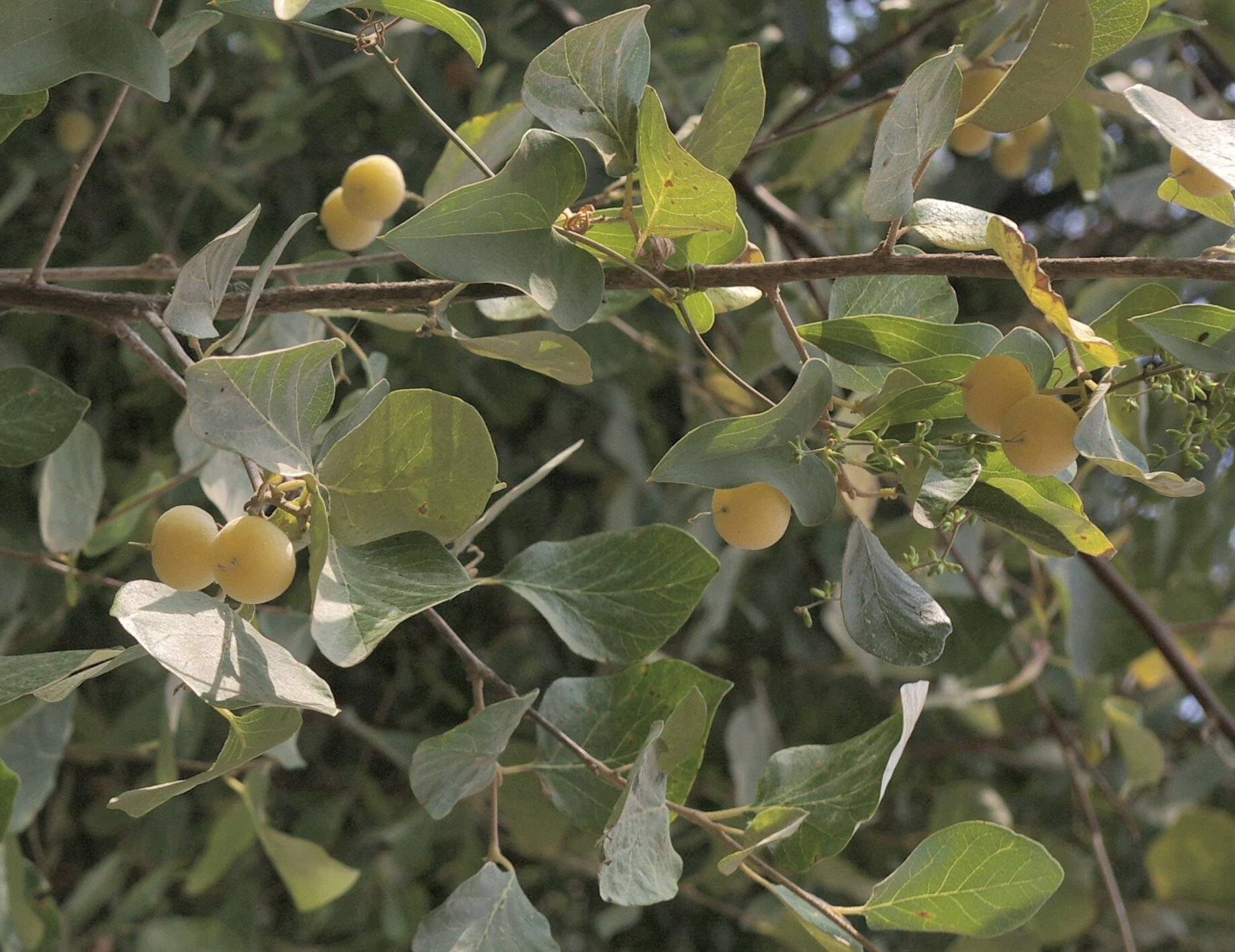
Styrax officinalis resin was mainly used in antiquity

Since Antiquity, storax resin has been used in perfumes (the most famous example is the Guerlain Shalimar perfume (1925), certain types of incense, and medicines.

There is some degree of uncertainty as to exactly what resin old sources refer to. Turkish sweetgum (Liquidambar orientalis) is a quite unrelated tree in the family Altingiaceae that produces a similar resin traded in modern times as storax or as Levant storax, like the resins of other sweetgums, and a number of confusing variations thereupon. Turkish sweetgum is a relict species that occurs only in a small area in SW Turkey (and not in the Levant at all); presumably, quite some of the "storax resin" of the Ancient Greek and the Ancient Roman sources was from this sweetgum, rather than a Styrax, although at least during the former era genuine Styrax resin, probably from S. officinalis, was imported in quantity from the Near East by Phoenician merchants, and Herodotus of Halicarnassus in the 5th century BC indicates that different kinds of storax were traded.

The nataf (נטף) of the incense sacred to Yahweh, mentioned in the Book of Exodus, is loosely translated by the Greek term staktē (στακτή, AMP: Exodus 30:34), or an unspecific "gum resin" or similar term (NIV: Exodus 30:34). Nataf may have meant the resin of Styrax officinalis or of some other plant, perhaps Turkish sweetgum, which is unlikely to have been imported in quantity into the Near East.

Since the Middle Ages, Southeast Asian benzoin resins became increasingly available; today there is little international trade in S. officinalis resin and little production of Turkish sweetgum resin due to that species' decline in numbers.

==== Use as incense ====
Storax incense is used in the Middle East and adjacent regions as an air freshener. This was adopted in the European Papier d'Arménie. Storax incense is used in Buddhist and Hindu rituals. Storax resin from southern Arabian species was burned during frankincense (Boswellia resin) harvesting; it was said to drive away snakes:

"[The Arabians] gather frankincense by burning that storax which Phoenicians carry to Hellas; they burn this and so get the frankincense; for the spice-bearing trees are guarded by small winged snakes of varied color, many around each tree; these are the snakes that attack Egypt. Nothing except the smoke of storax will drive them away from the trees."

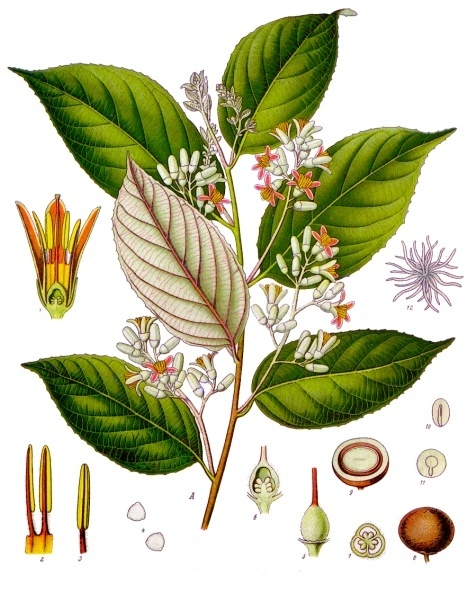
Gum benjamin (Styrax benzoin) parts drawing. Franz Eugen Köhler: Köhler's Medizinal-Pflanzen in naturgetreuen Abbildungen, etc. (1887)

==== Medical uses ====
There has been little dedicated research into the medical properties of storax resin, but it has been used for long, and apparently with favorable results. It was important in Islamic medicine; Avicenna (Ibn Sina, ابن سینا) discusses S. officinalis it in his Al-Qanun fi al-Tibb (القانون في الطب, The Law of Medicine). He indicates that storax resin mixed with other antibiotic substances and hardening material gives a good dental restorative material. Benzoin resin is a component of the "Theriaca Andromachi Senioris", a Venice treacle recipe in the 1686 d'Amsterdammer Apotheek.

Tincture of benzoin is benzoin resin dissolved in alcohol. This and its numerous derived versions like lait virginal and friar's balsam were highly esteemed in 19th-century European cosmetics and other household purposes; they apparently had antibacterial properties. Today tincture of benzoin is most often used in first aid for small injuries, as it acts as a disinfectant and local anesthetic and seems to promote healing. Benzoin resin and its derivatives are also used as additives in cigarettes.

The antibiotic activity of benzoin resin seems mostly due to its abundant benzoic acid and benzoic acid esters, which were named after the resin; other less well known secondary compounds such as lignans like pinoresinol are likely significant too.

=== Horticultural uses ===
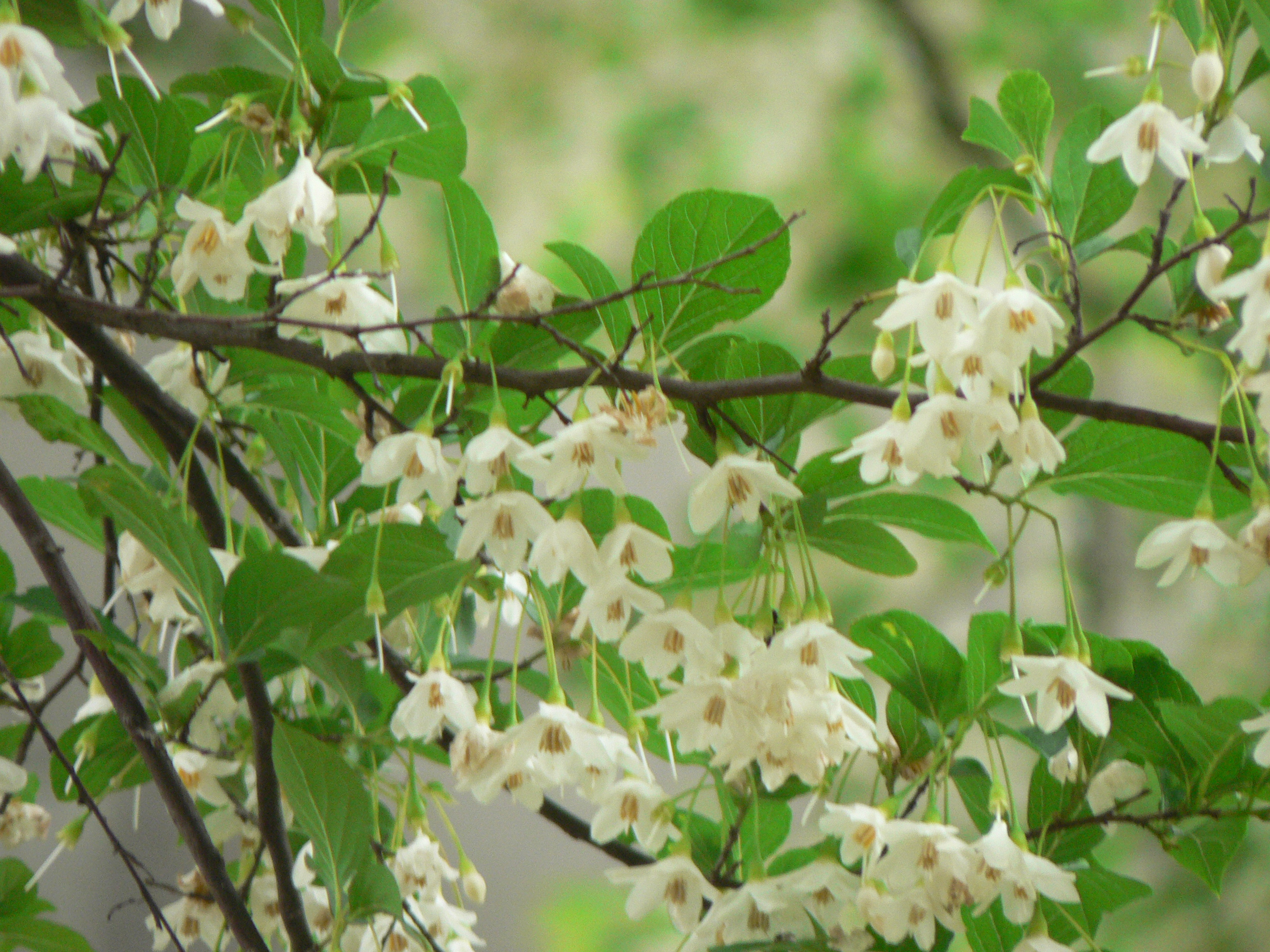
Early summer blossoms of Styrax japonicus

Several species of storax are popular ornamental trees in parks and gardens, especially S. japonicus and its cultivars such as 'Emerald Pagoda', and Styrax obassia.

=== Uses of wood ===
The wood of larger species is suitable for fine handicrafts. That of egonoki (エゴノキ, S. japonicus) is used to build kokyū (胡弓), the Japanese bowed instrument.

== Ecology and conservation ==
The resin of Styrax acts to kill wound pathogens and deter herbivores. Consequently, for example, few Lepidoptera caterpillars eat storax compared to other plants. Those of the two-barred flasher (Astraptes fulgerator) were recorded on S. argenteus, but they do not seem to use it on a regular basis.

Some storax species have declined in numbers due to unsustainable logging and habitat degradation. While most of these are classified as vulnerable (VU) by the IUCN, only four trees of the nearly extinct palo de jazmin (S. portoricensis) are known to survive at a single location. Although legally protected, this species could be wiped out by a single hurricane.

== Selected species ==
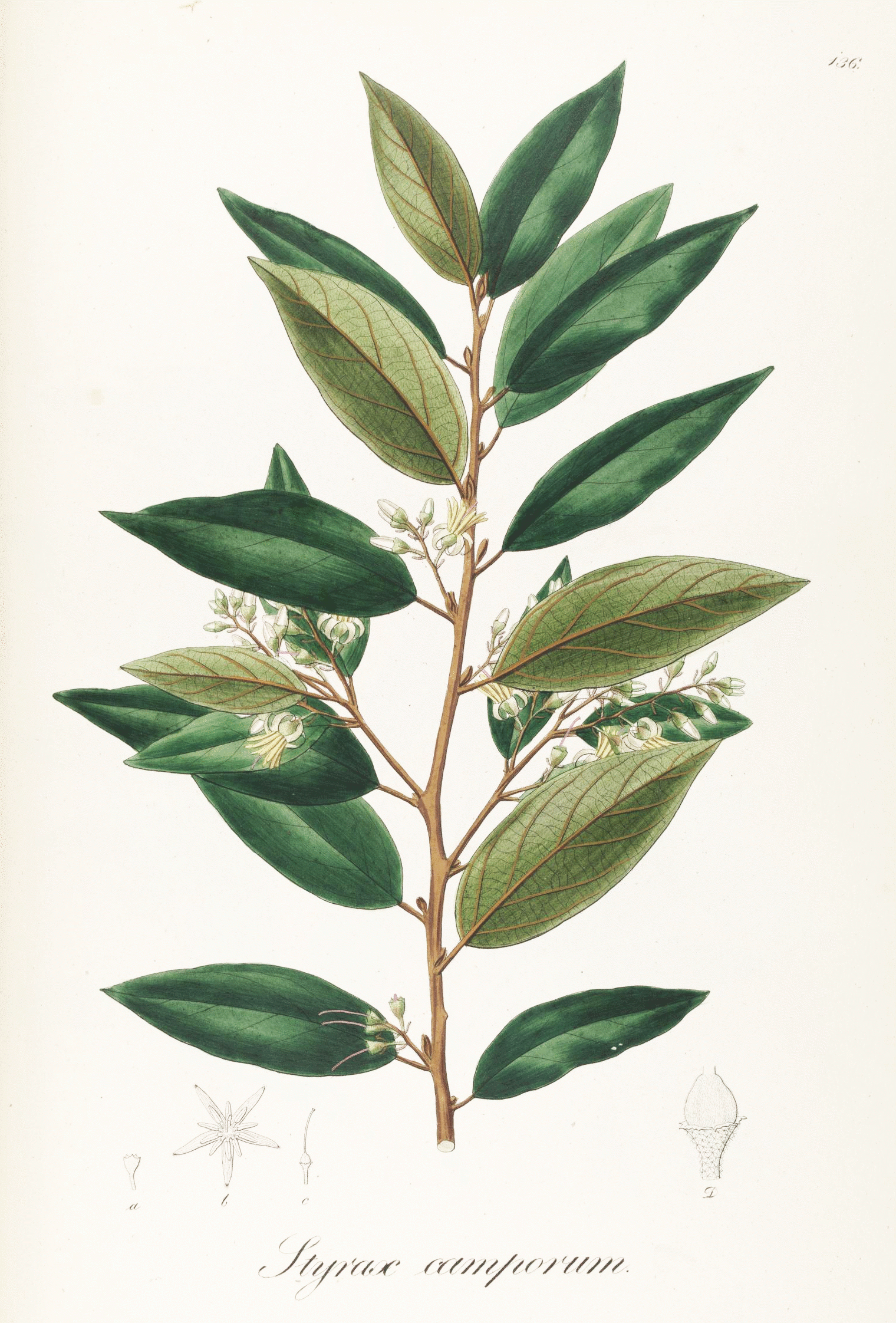
Styrax camporum parts drawing. Johann Baptist Emanuel Pohl: Plantarum Brasiliae icones et descriptiones hactenus ineditae Vol. 1. (1827)

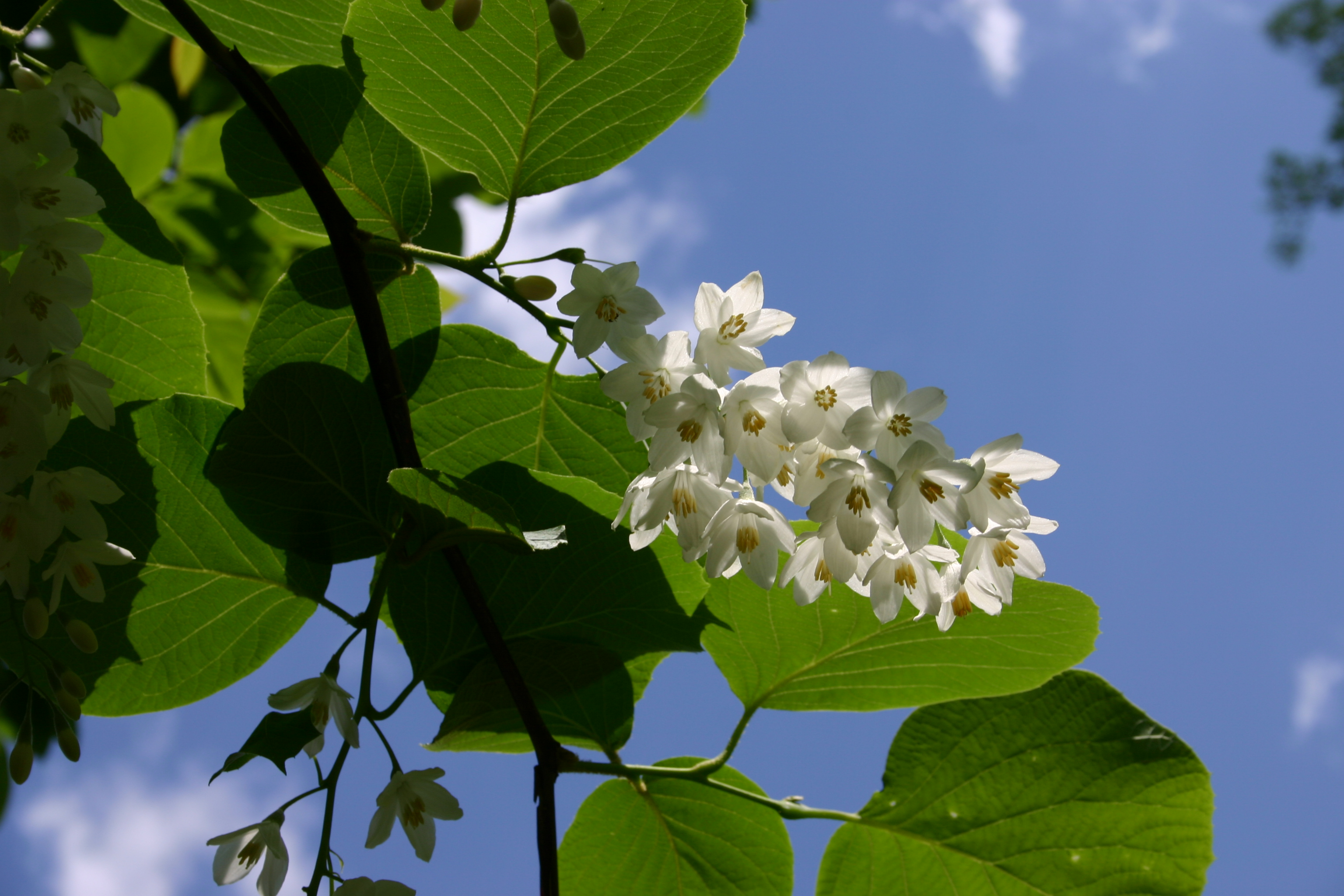
Styrax obassia

- Styrax agrestis – China
- Styrax americanus – SE USA
- Styrax argenteus – N & S America
- Styrax argentifolius – China
- Styrax bashanensis – China
- Styrax benzoides – Thailand, S China
- Styrax benzoin – Indonesia (Sumatra)
- Styrax calvescens – China
- Styrax camporum – Brazil, Bolivia, Paraguay
- Styrax chinensis – China
- Styrax chrysocalyx – Brazil
- Styrax chrysocarpus – China
- Styrax confusus – China
- Styrax cordatus – Peru, Ecuador
- Styrax crotonoides – Malaysia
- Styrax dasyanthus – central China
- Styrax faberi – China, Taiwan
- Styrax ferrugineus – Brazil, Bolivia, Paraguay
- Styrax formosanus – China, Taiwan
- Styrax foveolaria – Peru, Ecuador
- Styrax fraserensis – Malaysia
- Styrax grandiflorus – China
- Styrax grandifolius – SE USA
- Styrax hainanensis – S China
- Styrax hemsleyanus – China
- Styrax hookeri – Himalaya
- Styrax huanus – China
- Styrax jaliscana – Mexico
- Styrax japonicus – Japan, Korea, Taiwan, China
- Styrax limpritchii – SW China (Yunnan)
- Styrax litseoides – Vietnam
- Styrax macranthus – China
- Styrax macrocarpus – China
- Styrax martii – Brazil
- Styrax obassia – Japan, Korea, China
- Styrax odoratissimus – China
- Styrax officinalis – SE Europe, SW Asia
- Styrax pentlandianus – Bolivia, Peru, Ecuador, Colombia
- Styrax perkinsiae – China
- Styrax peruvianus – Costa Rica, Panama, Colombia, Ecuador, Peru
- Styrax philadelphoides – China
- Styrax platanifolius – Texas, NE Mexico
- Styrax pohlii – Suriname, Brazil, Peru, Bolivia
- Styrax portoricensis – Puerto Rico
- Styrax redivivus – California
- Styrax roseus – China
- Styrax rugosus – China
- Styrax schweliense – W China
- Styrax serrulatus – Himalaya, SW China
- Styrax shiraianum – Japan
- Styrax suberifolius – China, Taiwan, Vietnam, Myanmar
- Styrax supaii – China
- Styrax tomentosus – Colombia, Ecuador, Peru
- Styrax tonkinensis – SE and E Asia
- Styrax veitchiorum – China
- Styrax vilcabambae – Peru
- Styrax wilsonii – W China
- Styrax wuyuanensis – China
- Styrax zhejiangensis – China
