= Styrax crotonoides =

Conservation status
- Vulnerable (IUCN 3.1)

Scientific classification
- Kingdom: Plantae
- Clade: Tracheophytes
- Clade: Angiosperms
- Clade: Eudicots
- Clade: Asterids
- Order: Ericales
- Family: Styracaceae
- Genus: Styrax
- Species: S. crotonoides

Binomial name
- Styrax crotonoides C.B. Clarke

Species of flowering plant

Styrax crotonoides is a species of plant in the genus Styrax and family Styracaceae. It is found in Peninsular Malaysia and Singapore.
