= Styrax fraserensis =

Conservation status
- Vulnerable (IUCN 2.3)

Scientific classification
- Kingdom: Plantae
- Clade: Tracheophytes
- Clade: Angiosperms
- Clade: Eudicots
- Clade: Asterids
- Order: Ericales
- Family: Styracaceae
- Genus: Styrax
- Species: S. fraserensis

Binomial name
- Styrax fraserensis Putz & Ng

Species of tree

Styrax fraserensis is a species of flowering plant in the genus Styrax and family Styracaceae. It is a tree endemic to Peninsular Malaysia. It is threatened by habitat loss.
