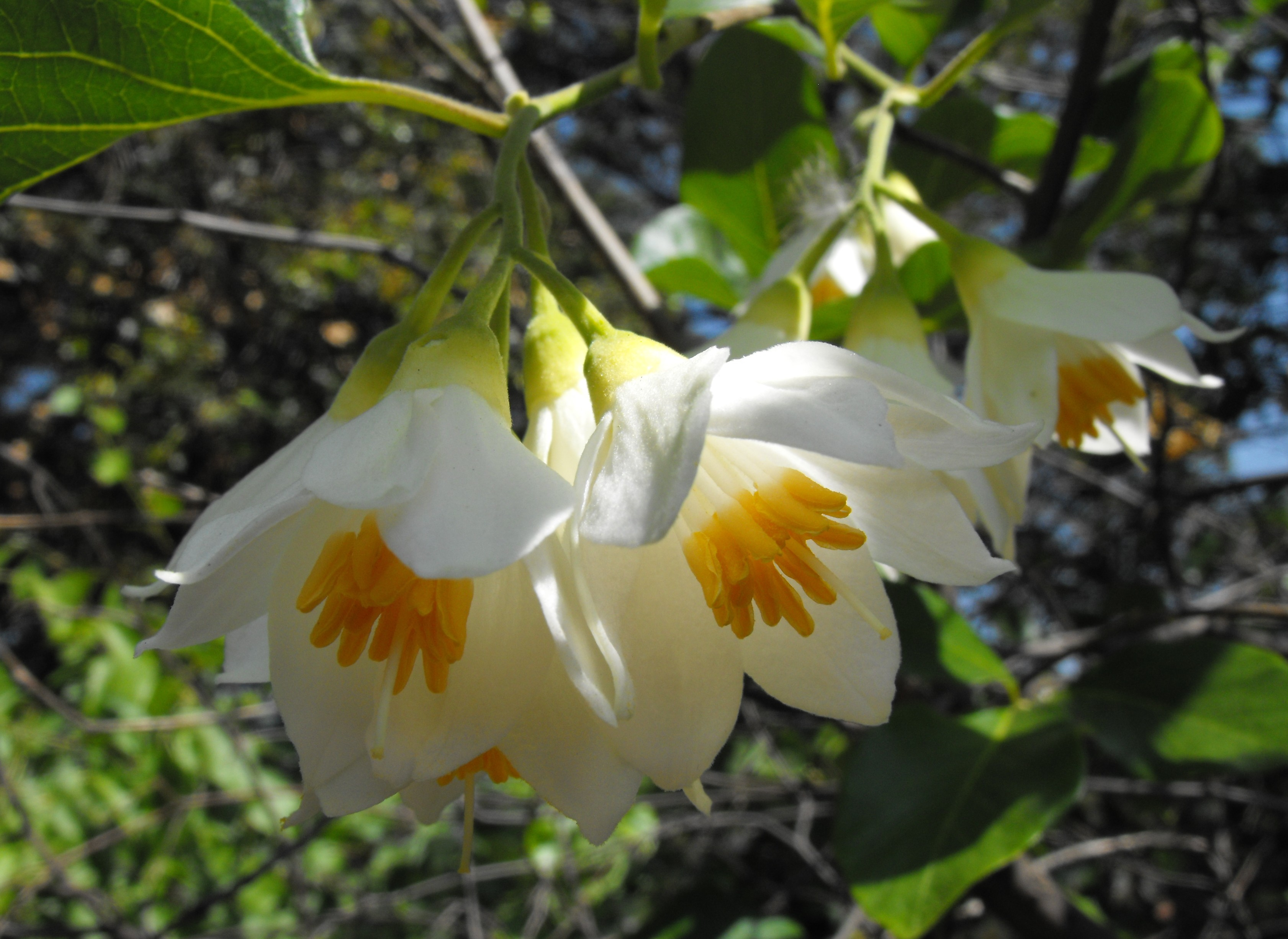
- Close-up of flowers.

Conservation status
- Imperiled (NatureServe)

Scientific classification
- Kingdom: Plantae
- Clade: Embryophytes
- Clade: Tracheophytes
- Clade: Angiosperms
- Clade: Eudicots
- Clade: Asterids
- Order: Ericales
- Family: Styracaceae
- Genus: Styrax
- Species: S. redivivus

Binomial name
- Styrax redivivus (Torr.) L.C.Wheeler

Synonyms
- Darlingtonia rediviva Torr.; Styrax californicus Torr.; Styrax californicus var. fulvescens Eastwood; Styrax officinalis var. californicus (Torr.) Rehder; Styrax officinalis var. fulvescens (Eastwood) Munz & I. M. Johnston

= Styrax redivivus =

Species of flowering plant

Styrax redivivus, with common names that include snowdrop bush, California styrax, bitternut, drug snowbell, and chaparral snowbell, is a species of flowering plant in the family Styracaceae. It is native to California, a shrub which can grow to 4 meters (13 ft) in height.

== Description ==
Styrax redivivus is a deciduous shrub, usually 1–3 m tall, with alternate roundish softly hairy leaves that are 2–7 cm long and nearly as wide. The numerous white flowers are borne in small showy clusters at the tips of the twigs. They are 12–18 mm long with the petals joined only near the base, commonly 6 in number but ranging from 4 to 8. The fruit is globose, not very fleshy, 12–14 mm long.

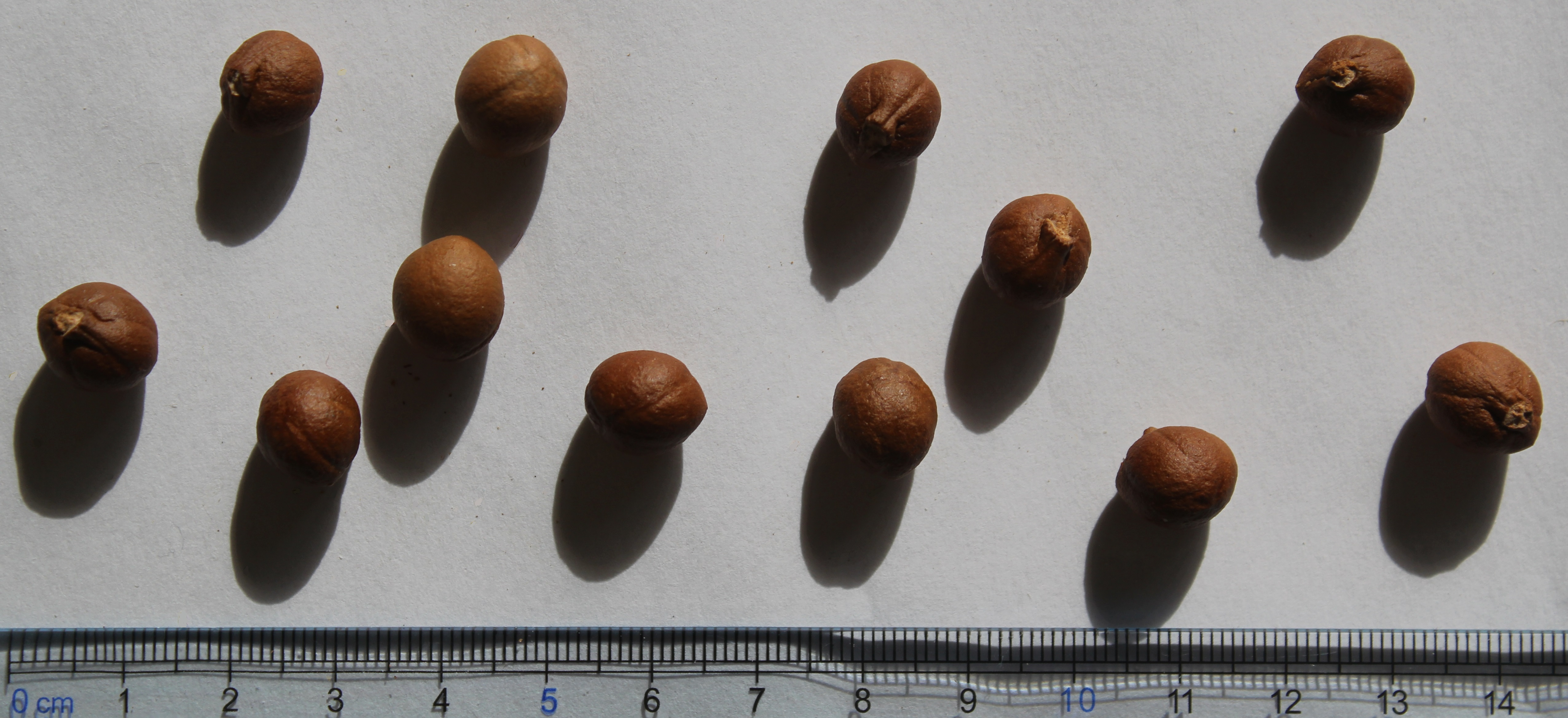
Seeds.

== Distribution ==
This tall attractive shrub flowers in spring and grows on dry bushy slopes at scattered localities from San Luis Obispo County to San Diego County. It is apparently absent from Santa Monica Mountains and all but the easternmost portion of the San Gabriel Mountains. In the Sierra Nevada it is a shrub of lower elevations below 900 m (3,000 ft) on the western slopes from Tulare County north. It occurs in chaparral, foothills, woodland and yellow pine forest, usually in open rocky areas.
