= Styrax litseoides =

Conservation status
- Vulnerable (IUCN 2.3)

Scientific classification
- Kingdom: Plantae
- Clade: Tracheophytes
- Clade: Angiosperms
- Clade: Eudicots
- Clade: Asterids
- Order: Ericales
- Family: Styracaceae
- Genus: Styrax
- Species: S. litseoides

Binomial name
- Styrax litseoides J.E.Vidal

Species of flowering plant

Styrax litseoides is a species of flowering plant in the genus Styrax and family Styracaceae. It is endemic to Vietnam.
