= Styrax pohlii =

Scientific classification
- Kingdom: Plantae
- Clade: Tracheophytes
- Clade: Angiosperms
- Clade: Eudicots
- Clade: Asterids
- Order: Ericales
- Family: Styracaceae
- Genus: Styrax
- Species: S. pohlii

Binomial name
- Styrax pohlii A. DC.

Synonyms
- Strigilia pohlii (A. DC.) Miers; Strigilia punctata (A. DC.) Miers; Styrax ambiguus Seub.; Styrax ambiguus var. apiculatus Chodat & Hassl.; Styrax bogotensis Perkins; Styrax discolor M.F. Silva; Styrax pachyphyllus Pilg.; Styrax pohlii f. calvescens Perkins; Styrax punctatus A. DC.; Styrax tafelbergensis Maguire

Species of tree

Styrax pohlii is a species of tree in the family Styracaceae. It is native to South America.
