= Styrax pentlandianus =

Scientific classification
- Kingdom: Plantae
- Clade: Tracheophytes
- Clade: Angiosperms
- Clade: Eudicots
- Clade: Asterids
- Order: Ericales
- Family: Styracaceae
- Genus: Styrax
- Species: S. pentlandianus

Binomial name
- Styrax pentlandianus J.Rémy

Synonyms
- S. buchtienii Sleumer; S. ferax J.F.Macbr.; S. leptactinosus Cuatrec.; S. socialis J.F.Macbr.; S. subheterotrichus Herzog

Species of tree

Styrax pentlandianus is a species of flowering plant in the family Styracaceae. It is native to South America.
