= Blechnum sociale =

Conservation status
- Data Deficient (IUCN 3.1)

Scientific classification
- Kingdom: Plantae
- Clade: Tracheophytes
- Division: Polypodiophyta
- Class: Polypodiopsida
- Order: Polypodiales
- Suborder: Aspleniineae
- Family: Blechnaceae
- Genus: Blechnum
- Species: B. sociale

Binomial name
- Blechnum sociale Sodiro

Synonyms
- Lomaria socialis (Sodiro) Sodiro

Species of fern

Blechnum sociale is a species of fern in the family Blechnaceae. It is endemic to Pichincha Province and Azuay Province, Ecuador, but has not been recorded since 1893. The name sociale indicates that they form in colonies. It was first described by Luis Sodiro in 1883. In 1893, Sodiro transferred it to Lomaria as Lomaria socialis. He said that the most similar species was Lomaria stipitellata, now placed in Parablechnum as Parablechnum stipitellatum. The status and taxonomy of Blechnum sociale was unclear as of 2003.

The epithet is sometimes incorrectly given as socialis, but Blechnum is neuter so the epithet should be sociale.

Its natural habitat is subtropical or tropical high-altitude shrubland. It is threatened by habitat loss for fires and grazing and it is possible it occurs in Reserva ecológica Cotacachi-Cayapas and Reserva ecológica Antisana.
