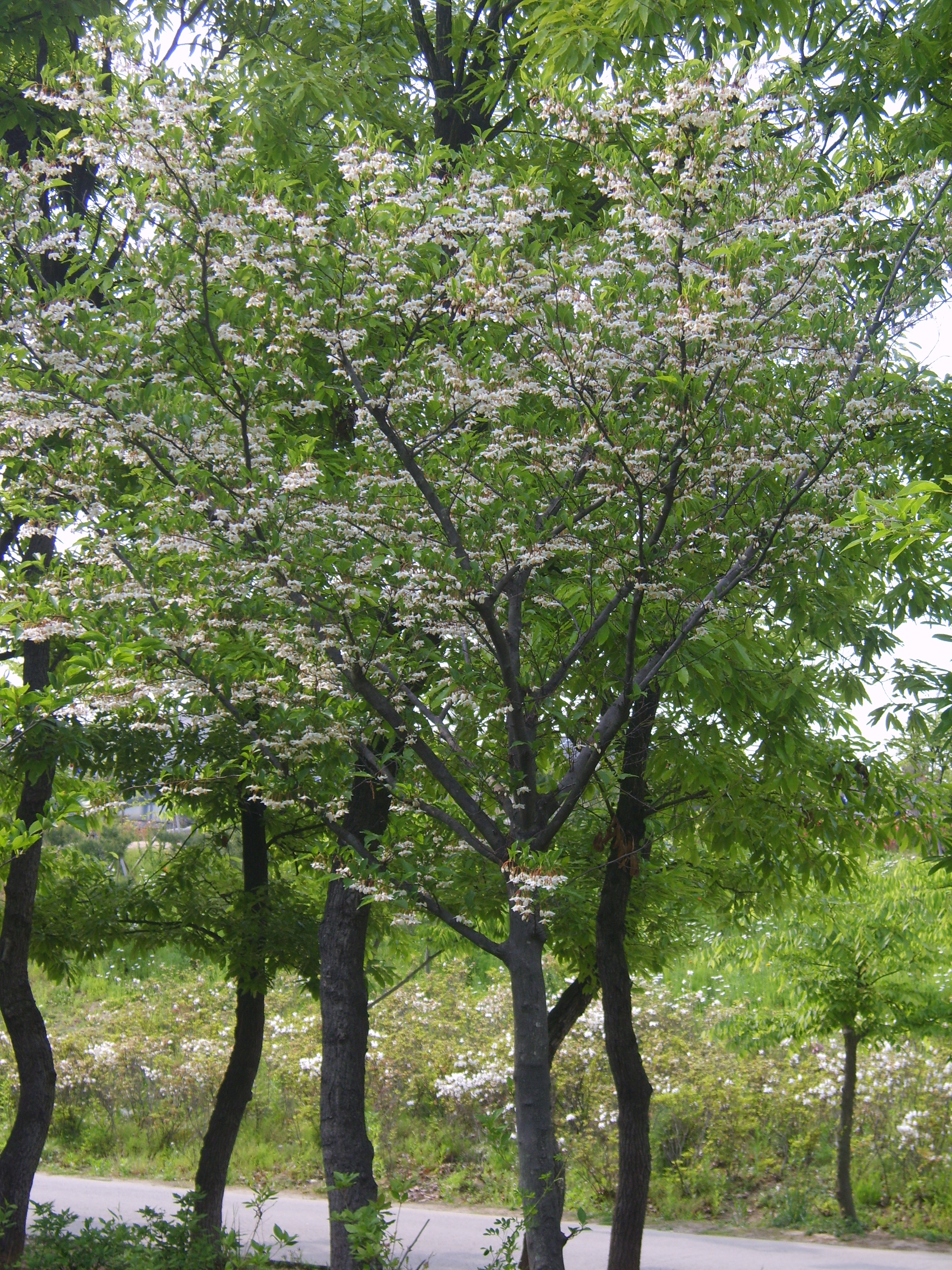

Conservation status
- Least Concern (IUCN 3.1)

Scientific classification
- Kingdom: Plantae
- Clade: Tracheophytes
- Clade: Angiosperms
- Clade: Eudicots
- Clade: Asterids
- Order: Ericales
- Family: Styracaceae
- Genus: Styrax
- Species: S. japonicus

Binomial name
- Styrax japonicus Siebold & Zucc.

= Styrax japonicus =

Species of flowering plant

Styrax japonicus (野茉莉; also エゴノキ, egonoki), also known as the Japanese snowbell, is a species of flowering plant in the family Styracaceae, native to Korea, Japan, and Southern China. Growing to 12 m (39 ft) tall by 8 m (26 ft) broad, it is a graceful, spreading deciduous tree with oval, upward-facing leaves which occasionally turn yellow or orange before falling in autumn. Masses of slightly fragrant, bell-shaped white flowers hang from the branches in summer, followed by fruits (drupes) which resemble olives in both shape and colour.

It is hardy down to −15 °C (5 °F), but prefers a sheltered position in full sun or dappled shade, with acidic or neutral soil.

Due to its plentiful flowers, the tree has been widely cultivated in Western gardens. Properties such as analgesic, hypoglycaemic, and antibacterial effects have been observed in extracts and isolates from the flowers, stem-bark, and leaves, respectively.

== Etymology ==
Styrax japonicus is a member of the Styracaceae family, with the authority of Siebold & Zuccarini. Styrax is a genus whose members produce aromatic resins. The Latin specific epithet japonicus means "from Japan".

The Japanese common name, egonoki (野茉莉; エゴノキ), originates from how the fruit annoys the throat and tongue when put in the mouth — egui (えぐい) or egoi (えごい) describes something that evokes a repulsive, bitter flavor.

== Description ==
The appearance of Styrax japonicus ranges from a large shrub to a small tree.

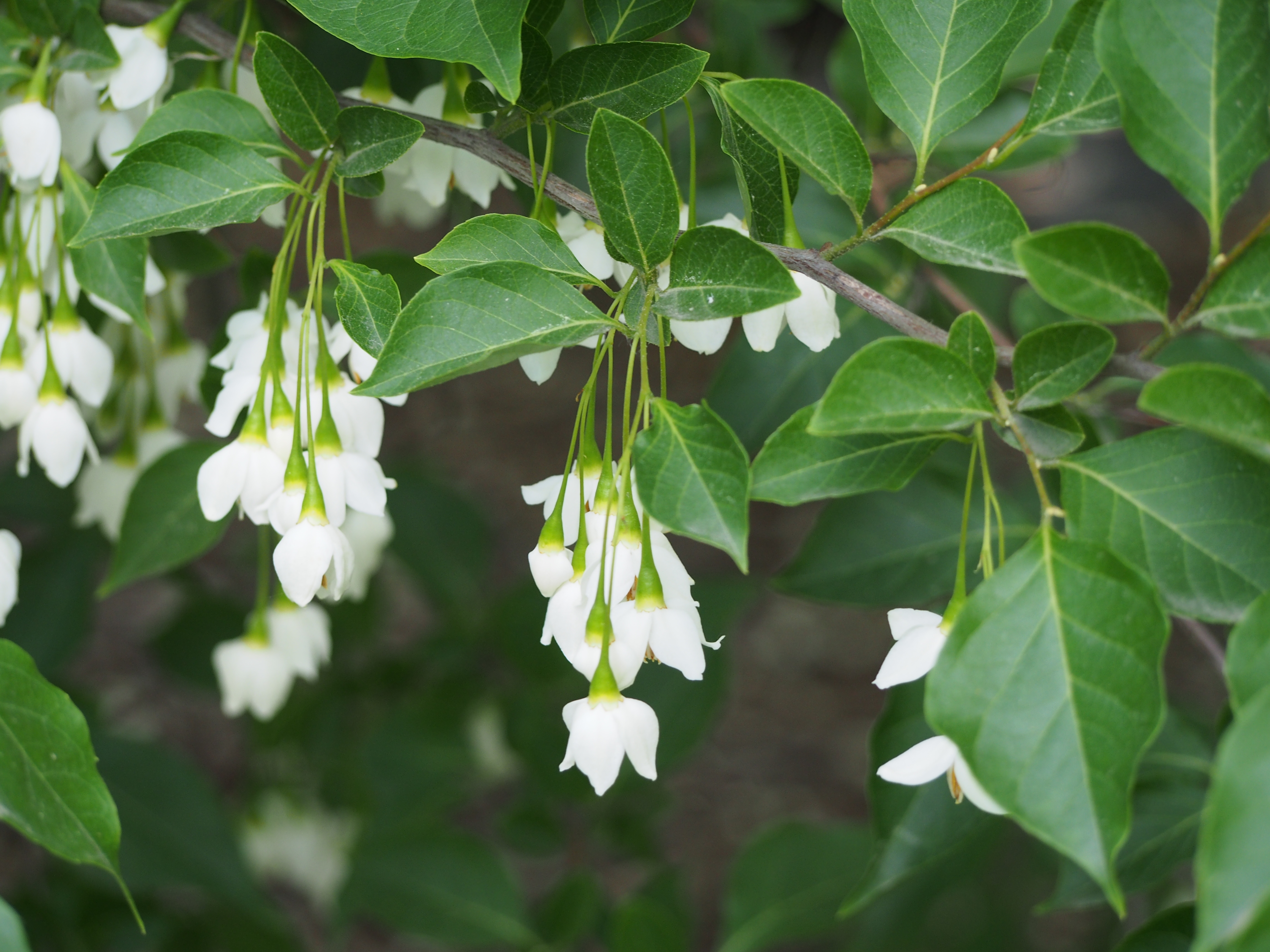
Raceme arrangement of Styrax japonicus flowers.

=== Leaves ===
Leaves are simple in alternate arrangement. They are upward-facing with an oblong shape, dark green and shiny.

=== Flowers ===
The flowers of S. japonicus are pendulous and arranged in a raceme inflorescence. When in bloom, they evoke a light fragrance. The petals are commonly colored white; however, the petals of the 'Pink Chime' cultivar is pink. The five-petaled, bell-shaped corolla is around 2-3 cm long and typically blooms in late spring. The corolla is surrounded by 5-toothed calyx. They are perfect and perigynous with prominent yellow stamens.

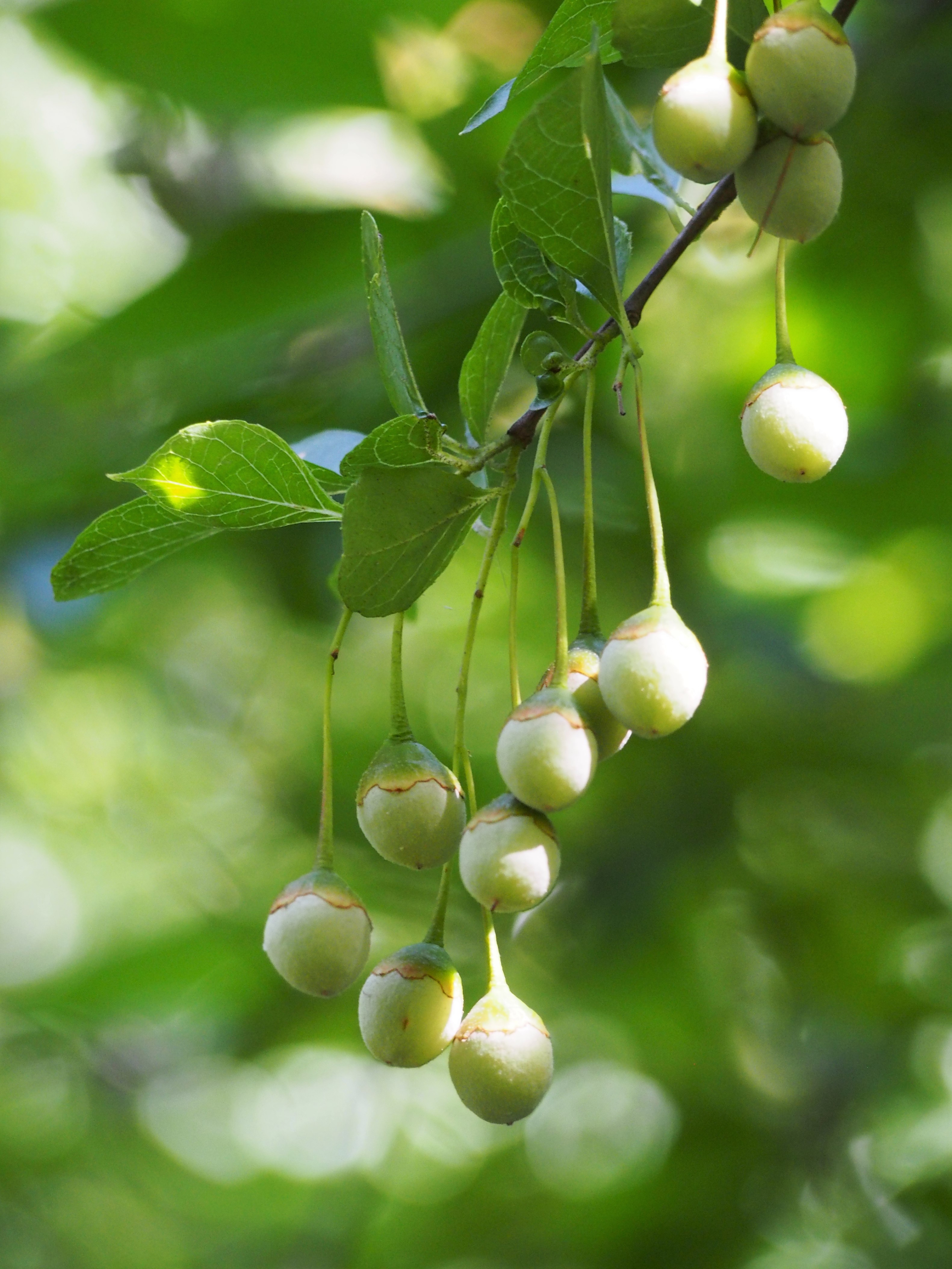
Unripe fruits of Styrax japonicus.

=== Fruit ===
The gray-green drupe-like capsule fruits of S. japonicus are around 2 centimetres (0.79 in) long, appearing around August and September. Long stalks extend from each drupe and attach with star-shaped calyx. Each fruit contains one seed.

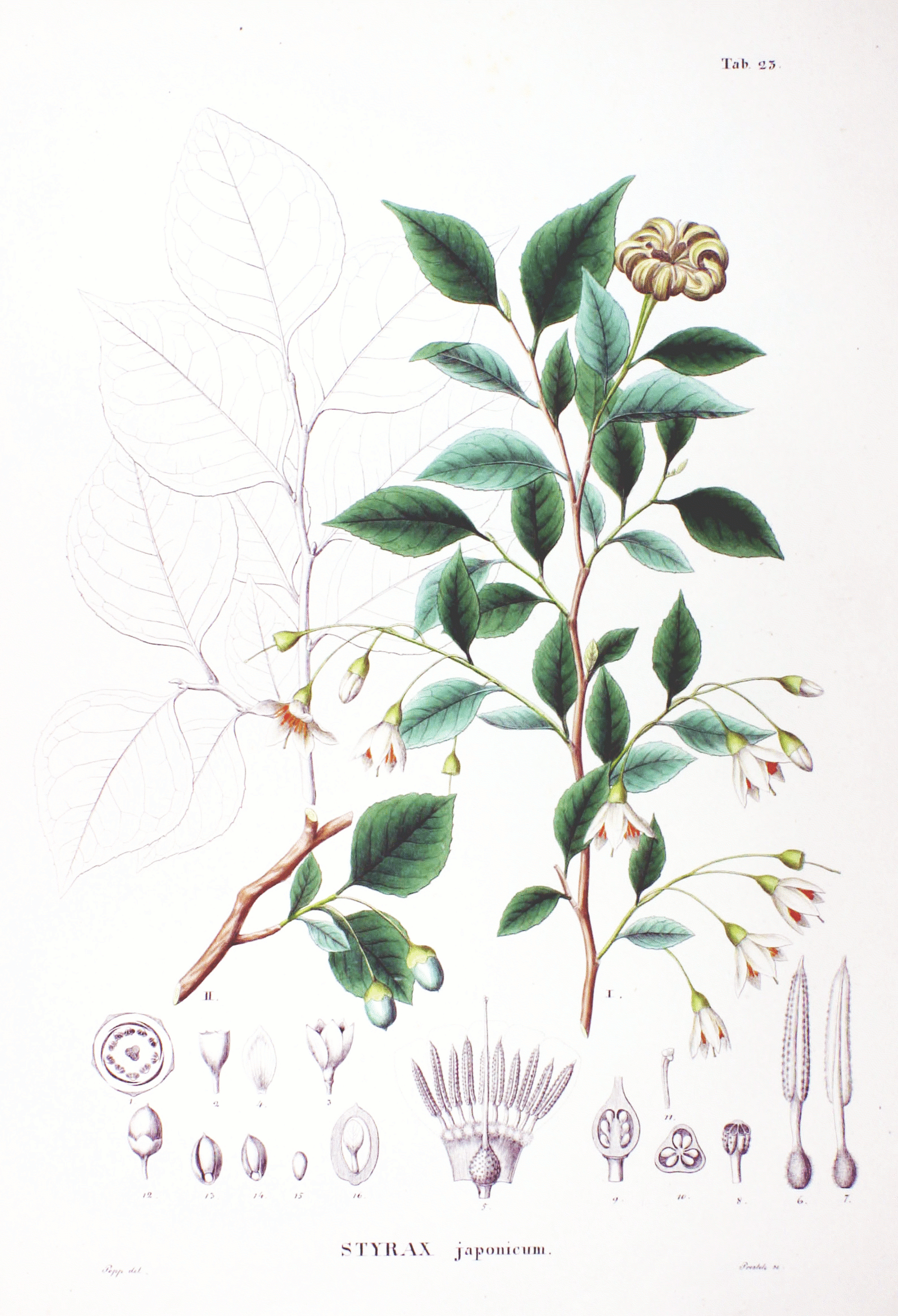
Plate from Flora Japonica (1870)

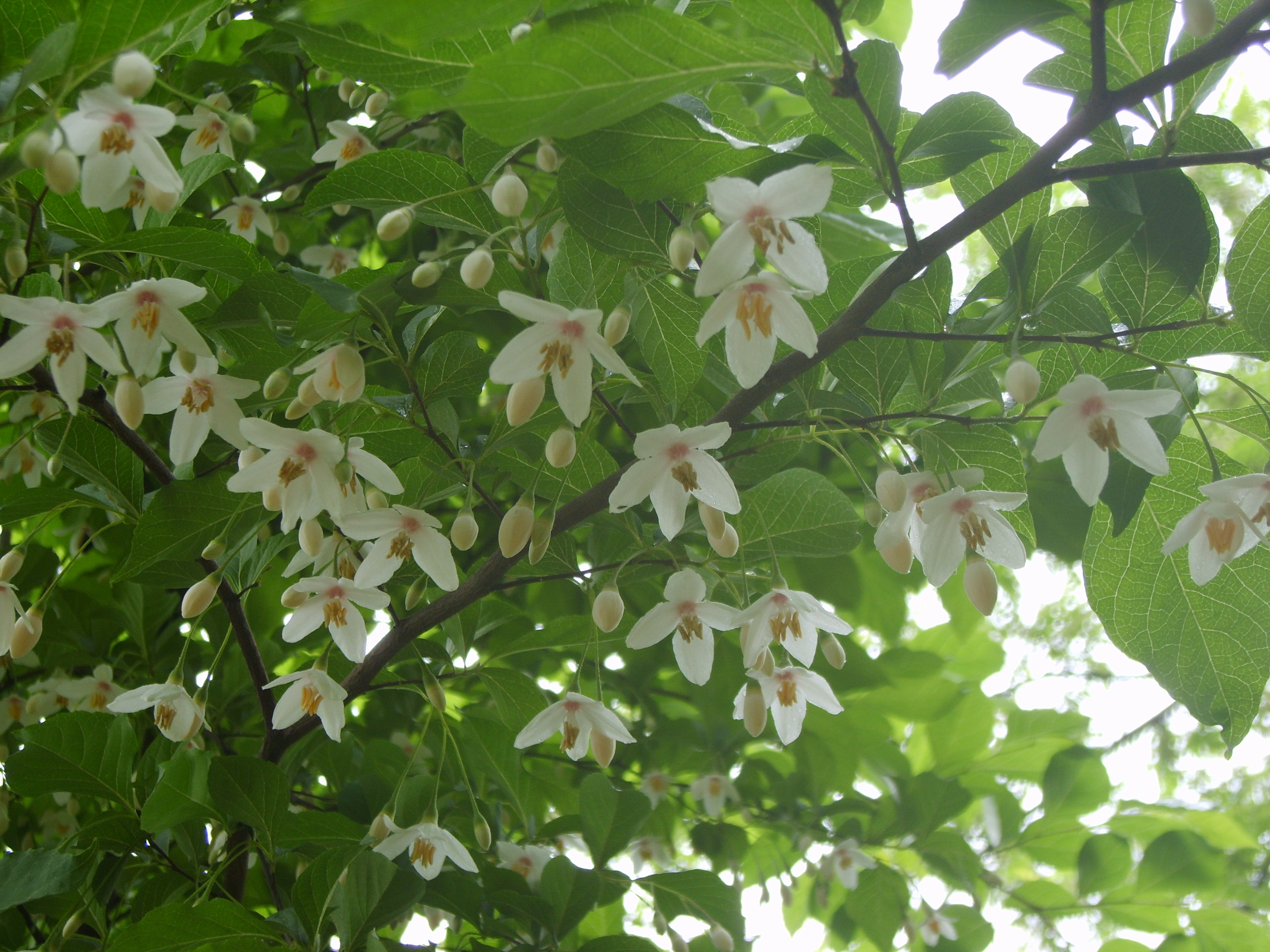
Flowers and buds

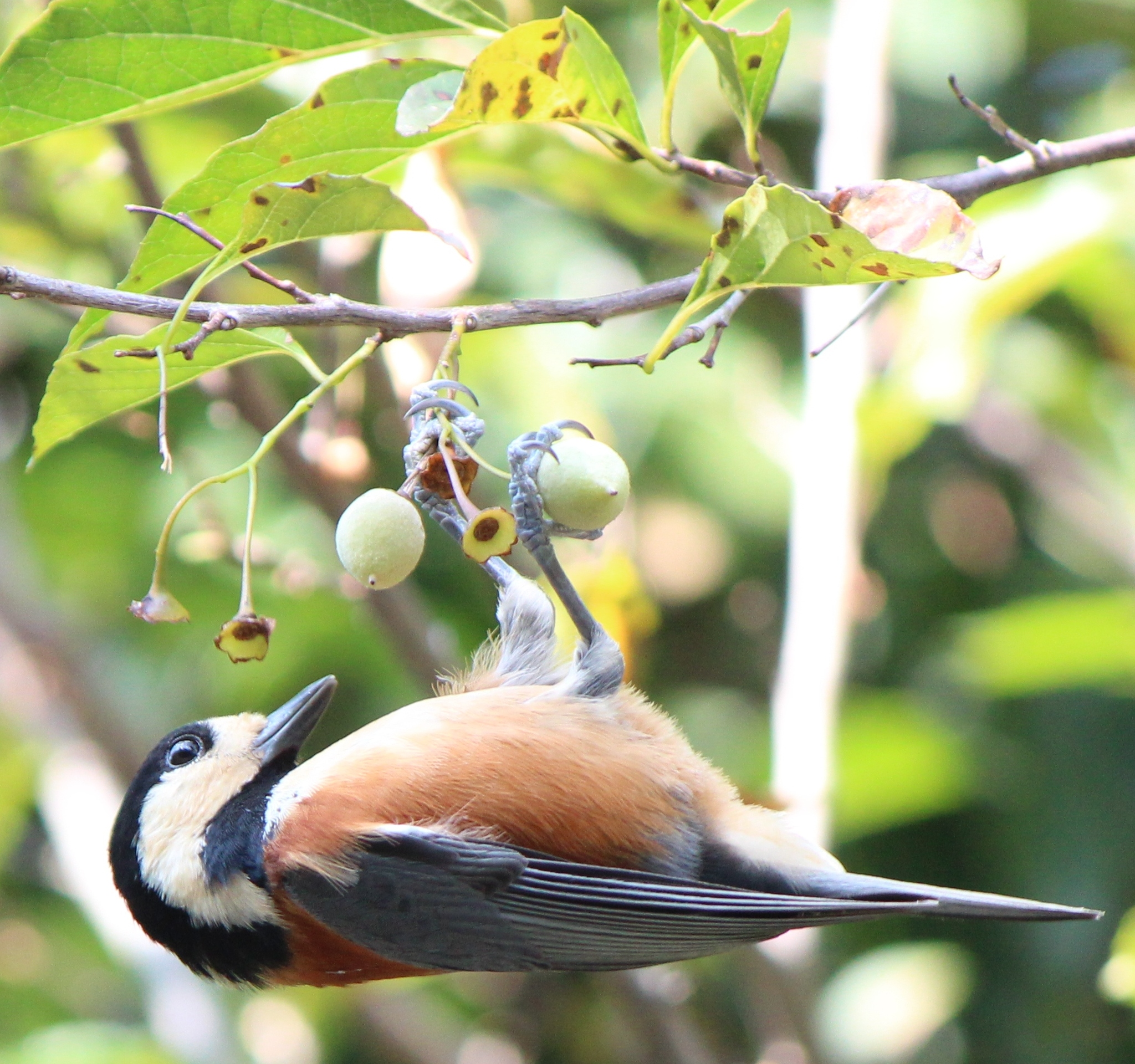
Varied tit eating the fruits

== Distribution and habitat ==
=== Distribution ===
Styrax japonicus is native to Korea, Japan, and Southern China. It has the largest distribution out of the members in the genus Styrax. An attractive landscape tree, it can be found commonly within parks and gardens.

=== Habitat ===
Generally pest-resistant and disease-resistant, weaker trees may be susceptible to the ambrosia beetle. It is cold hardy to −15 °C (5 °F), with a classification of USDA hardiness zones ranging from 5-8, depending on the cultivation and provenance.

S. japonicus prefer acidic or neutral soil. They should be planted with full sun or part sun/part shade exposure, protection from cold and dry wind, and provided consistently moist soil.

There is no known threat to the conservation of the species. The IUCN Red List of Threatened Plants ranks S. japonicus as "Least Concern", last assessed in 2019.

== Cultivation ==
The first introduction of Styrax to the West was by Richard Oldham in 1862. Styrax japonicus is known to be one of the most cultivated species in North American and European gardens and one of the most common Styrax cultivars. It has been cultivated for its pendulous forms, flower color, dwarfism, foliage colorization (such as burgundy leaves), and temperature tolerance.

In particular, the Japanese name Benibana (ベニバナ) Group, refers to cultivars with pink flowers and is inclusive of the cultivar 'Pink Chimes'. Japanese gardeners use the term Beniego (ベニエゴ) to describe this cultivar.

The cultivar 'Fargesii', with larger flowers and leaves than the typical species, has gained the Royal Horticultural Society's Award of Garden Merit.

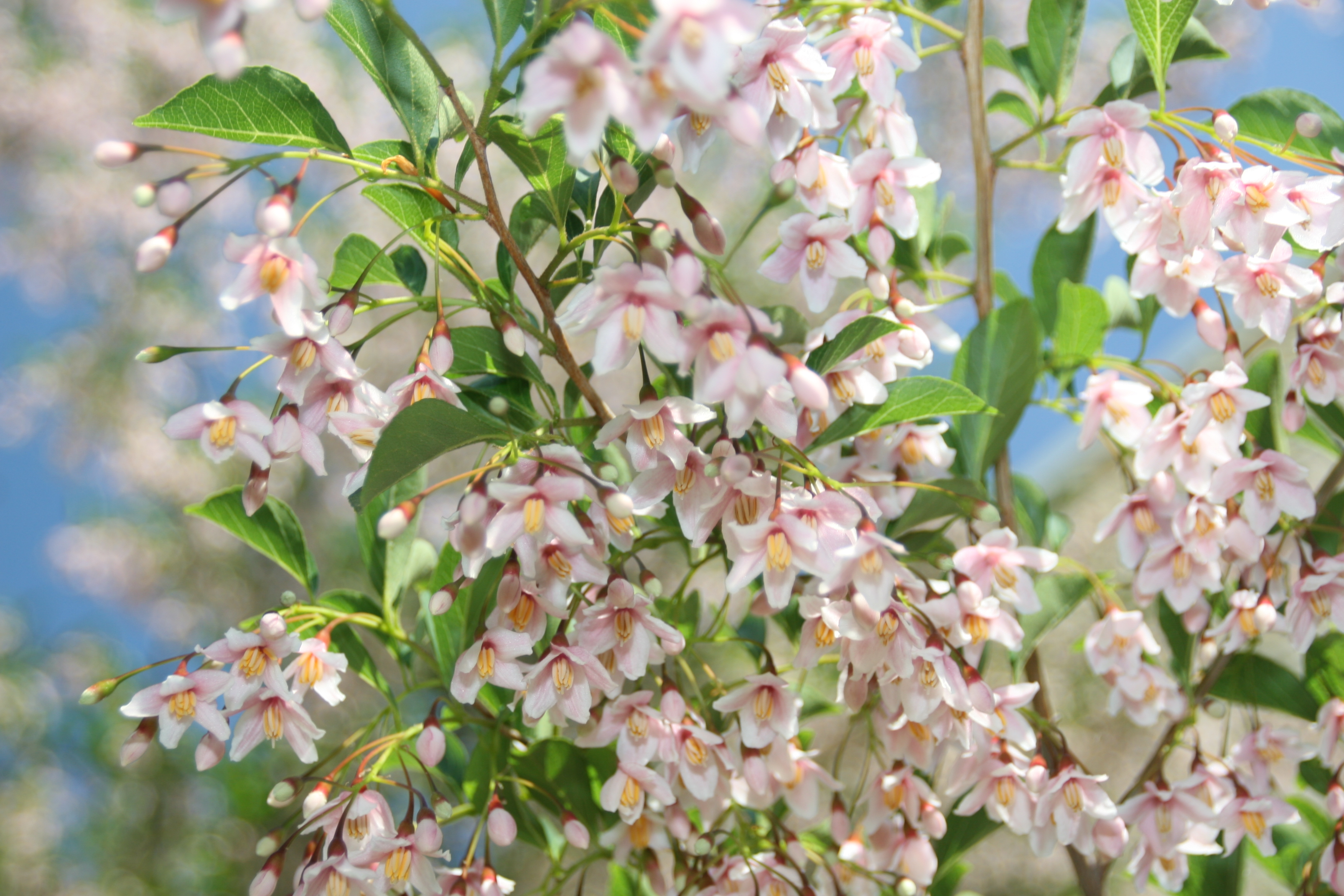
Pink-hued flowers of Styrax japonica 'Pink Chimes'.

Common Cultivars include:

- 'Angyo Dwarf'
- 'Carillon'
- 'Crystal'
- 'Emerald Pagoda'
- 'Evening Light'
- 'Fargesil'
- 'Fragrant Fountain'
- 'Issai'
- 'Pink Chimes'
- 'Snow Cone'

== Medicinal properties and uses ==
=== Phytochemical properties ===
Analgesic effects have been found with the use of flower ethanol extracts, with kaempferol-3-O-rutinoside suggested as the active analgesic component.

Extracts found from the stem-bark have hypoglycaemic effects (in particular, triterpenoids and sterol), as well as isolates that serve as immunity regulators (egonol, masutakeside I, straxosides A, and straxosides B).

It is also suggested that Styrax japonicus contains antibacterial properties. Water extract of S. japonicus leaves inhibited growth against Escherichia coli, Klebsiella pneumoniae, Salmonella and Staphylococcus aureus (except Candida albicans). Steam distillation and solvent extraction of leaves had antibacterial effects on Bacillus cereus and Salmonella Typhimurium.

=== Ornamental use ===
The masses of flowers present on a blooming tree lead to the pronounced prevalence and popularity of S. japonicus cultivars. It is thought that the tree's abundant flowers, along with its lavish foliage and striated bark, contributed to its successful introduction from Eastern Asia to Western gardens.

However, S. japonicus has a relatively limited flowering period; a single flower has a blooming period of 4-5 days before wilting and a group of flowers last around 2 weeks, prompting studies investigating how to prolong the flowering period.

=== Medicinal use ===
Chinese traditional medicinal use of S.japonicus has pharmacological evidence, such as the analgesic effects used to treat toothaches and sore throats and antitussive purposes to treat coughs.

=== Cultural Use ===
Along with its cultivation for ornamental use, S. japonicus has been used for its material and chemical contents. The hardwood was used to compose umbrella ribbing and pieces for shogi (a Japanese strategy board game).

The dried pericarp of young fruit has been used to make washing soap, due to saponin contents. It also contains large amounts of egosaponin, a poisonous agent that has been used in East Asian traditional fishing to stun fish and make them easier to catch.
