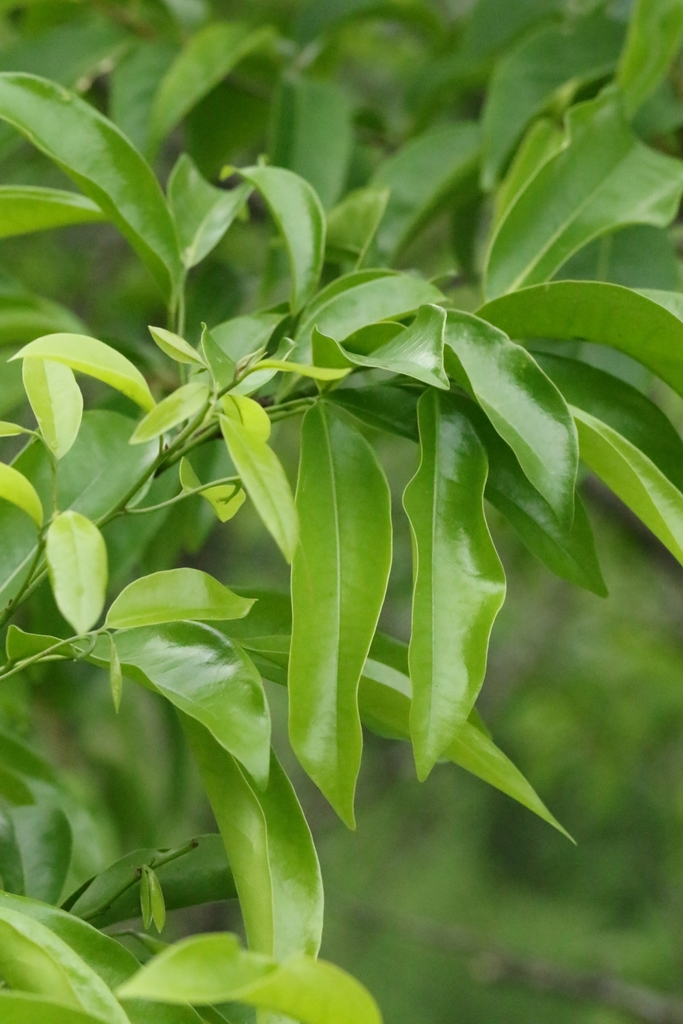
- Rehderodendron kwangtungense leaves observed at Tai Mo Shan, Hong Kong in April 2025

Scientific classification
- Kingdom: Plantae
- Clade: Tracheophytes
- Clade: Angiosperms
- Clade: Eudicots
- Clade: Asterids
- Order: Ericales
- Family: Styracaceae
- Genus: Rehderodendron
- Species: R. kwangtungense

Binomial name
- Rehderodendron kwangtungense Chun

= Rehderodendron kwangtungense =

Species of tree

Rehderodendron kwangtungense is a species of tree found in southern China. It belongs to the family Styracaceae, and it grows in forests at elevations between 100 and 1300 meters. The species is described based on a sample discovered in Ruyuan, Guangdong.

Kwangtungense refers to it originating from Guangdong. Its common name in Hong Kong is literally called Guangdong red papaya (廣東木瓜紅), due to the fruit's shape resembling that of a papaya.

== Description ==
This tree can grow up to 15 meters tall, with a trunk diameter of about 20 centimeters. Its young branches are brown or reddish-brown and glossy, while older branches turn gray-brown.

The leaves are oval or elliptical in shape, slightly pointy, and can be 7–16 cm long and 3–8 cm wide. They have small, spaced teeth along the edges and a green upper surface with a lighter green underside. Both sides are hairless, but the veins stand out clearly and are purple-red in color. The leaf stalk is 1–1.5 cm long and has a groove on the upper side.

The winter buds are reddish-brown, covered by several scaly layers. The lower scales are broad and egg-shaped, while the upper ones are more elongated and pointed. The outermost scales may have fine hairs along the edges.

The flowers appear in clusters about 7 cm long, usually before the leaves fully grow. Each cluster has 6–8 white flowers. All parts of the flower stalks and sepals are covered with soft, gray-yellow, star-shaped hairs. Each flower is about 2–2.5 cm long, and the petals are oval and slightly unequal in size. There are 10 stamens; some are as long as the petals, while others are shorter. The anthers (pollen parts) are about 6 mm long. The style (female part of the flower) is longer than the stamens.

The fruit is oval, egg-shaped or oblong, and measures 4.5–8 cm long and 2.5–4 cm in diameter. When ripe, the fruit turns brown or gray-brown and may have fine short hairs or be hairless. It has 5 to 10 ridges, with a navel-like bump at the tip. The fruit has a hard, woody outer shell, a thick, corky middle layer, and a tough, woody inner layer. Inside, the seed is long and narrow, about 2–2.5 cm long, and chestnut-brown in color.

== Blooming and fruiting season ==
Flowers bloom from March to April. Fruits ripen from July to September.

== Habitat ==
It is native to southern China, and is found in Hunan, Guangdong, Guangxi, Yunnan and Hong Kong. It grows in dense forests, at elevations from 100 to 1300 meters.

== Conservation ==
In Hong Kong, it is a protected under Forestry Regulations Cap. 96A. It is illegal to possess and sell any parts of the tree.

A Rehderodendron kwangtungense tree was propagated and planted in Kadoorie Farm and Botanic Garden from seeds collected 15 years ago from Orchid Haven (蘭花谷), Hong Kong.

== Sources ==
- 吳容芬、黃淑美（1987）。《中國植物志》，第60卷（第2期），136頁。Wu, R. F. & Huang, S. M. (1987) Flora Reipublicae Popularis Sinicae, vol. 60(2), Science Press, Beijing. [In Chinese.]
