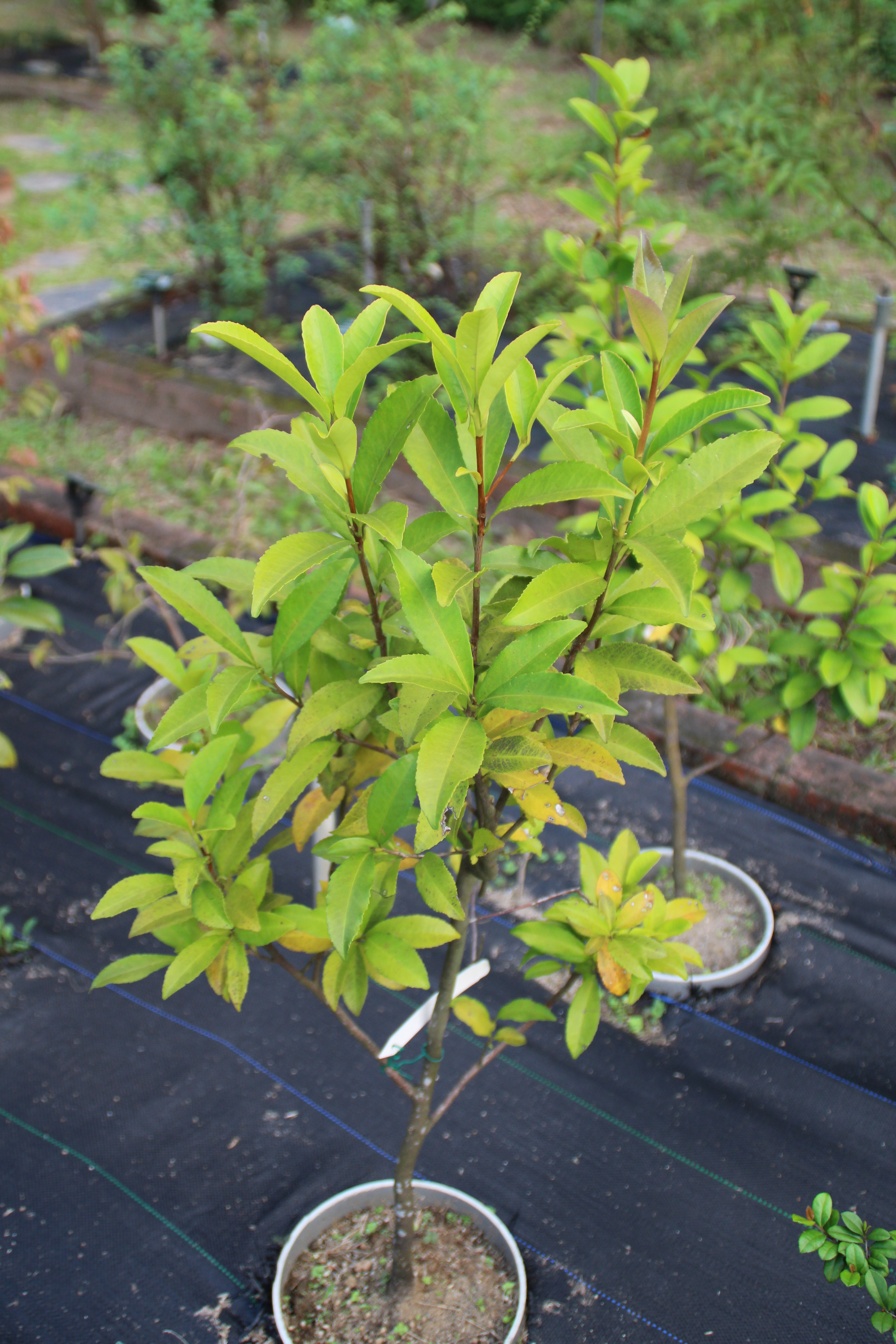

Conservation status
- Critically Endangered (IUCN 3.1)

Scientific classification
- Kingdom: Plantae
- Clade: Tracheophytes
- Clade: Angiosperms
- Clade: Eudicots
- Clade: Asterids
- Order: Ericales
- Family: Theaceae
- Genus: Pyrenaria
- Species: P. buisanensis

Binomial name
- Pyrenaria buisanensis (Sasaki) C.F.Hsieh et al.

Synonyms
- Camellia buisanensis Sasaki

= Pyrenaria buisanensis =

Species of tree

Pyrenaria buisanensis (common name: Wuwei camellia) is a species of tea endemic to Taiwan. It was first described by the Japanese botanist Shun-ichi Sasaki in 1931, but the herbarium specimens were lost and the species identity remained dubious until a 2004 publication that reported its rediscovery and reclassified it as a species of Pyrenaria. Its status remains controversial, with some sources including it in Pyrenaria microcarpa as P. microcarpa var. ovalifolia.

== Description ==
Pyrenaria buisanensis is an evergreen tree that can grow up to 15 m (49 ft) tall. Bark is brown-reddish with thin and irregular slices. The leaves are alternate, more or less clustered, thick-coriaceous, elliptic or obovate and typically measure 6 cm–11 cm × 2.5 cm–4 cm (2.4 in–4.3 in × 1.0 in–1.6 in), occasionally longer. The flowers are axillary and solitary. The corolla is white to pale-yellow and measures 2–3.5 cm (0.8–1.4 in) in diameter.

The flowers can be used for making tea.

== Habitat and conservation ==
This species is known from only three localities in Pingtung County, southern Taiwan. It grows at forest edges and on mountain ridges at elevations below 1,000 m (3,300 ft). Only about 35–40 mature trees are known to exist. In the past, it has greatly suffered from logging. Current threats include weather damage, collection for firewood, and potentially collection into horticulture.
