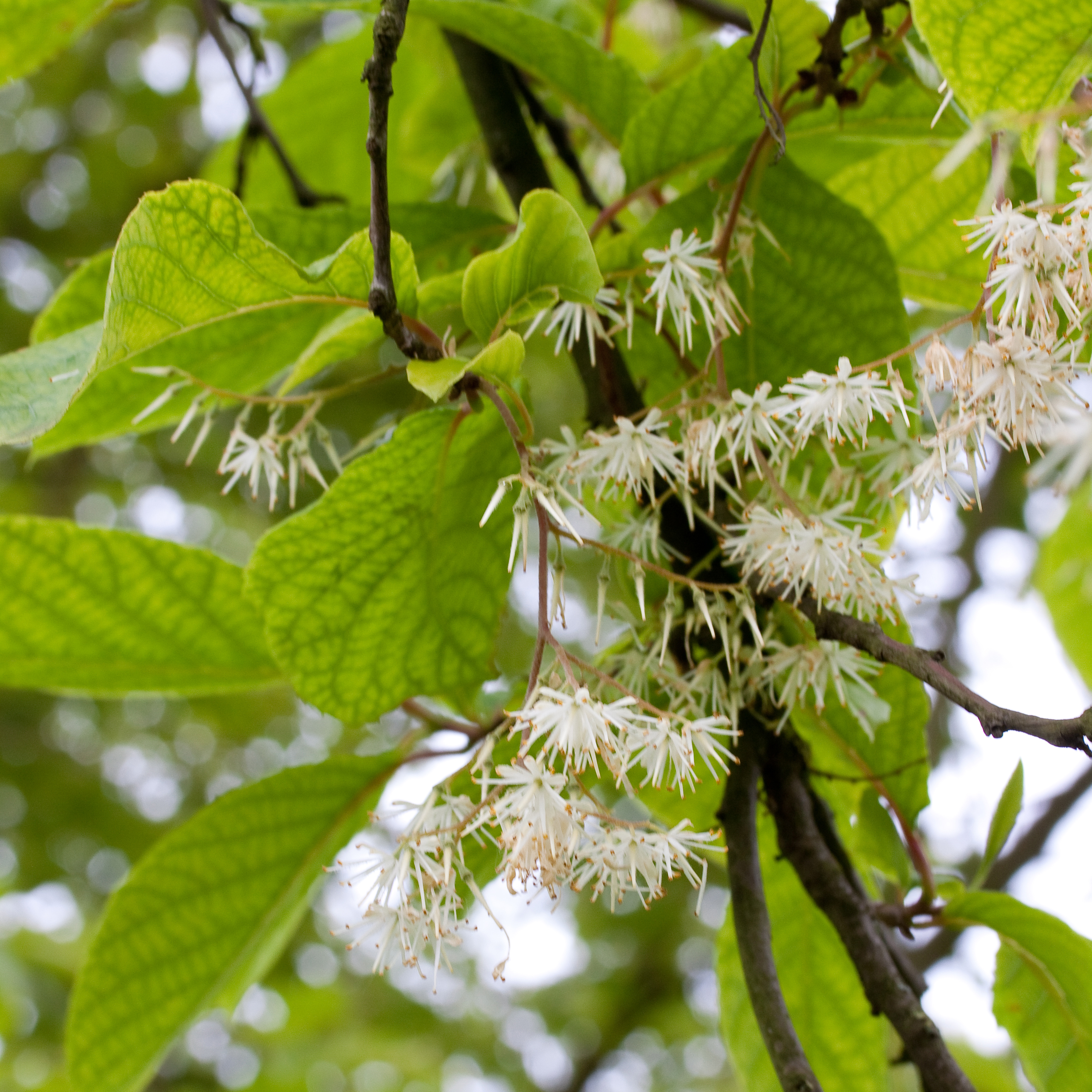

Conservation status
- Vulnerable (IUCN 2.3)

Scientific classification
- Kingdom: Plantae
- Clade: Embryophytes
- Clade: Tracheophytes
- Clade: Angiosperms
- Clade: Eudicots
- Clade: Asterids
- Order: Ericales
- Family: Styracaceae
- Genus: Pterostyrax
- Species: P. psilophyllus

Binomial name
- Pterostyrax psilophyllus Diels ex Perkins

= Pterostyrax psilophyllus =

Species of flowering plant

Pterostyrax psilophyllus is a species of flowering plant in the family Styracaceae. It is endemic to central China. It is threatened by habitat loss.

It is a deciduous small tree growing to 15 m (50 ft) tall, with a trunk up to 45 cm (18 in) diameter. The leaves are alternate, simple, 4–15 cm (2–6 in) long and 5–9 cm (2–4 in) broad, oblong-elliptic, densely hairy on the underside, and with a coarsely serrated margin and a 1–2 cm (0.4–0.8 in) petiole. The flowers are white, 12–14 mm (0.5–0.6 in) long, produced on panicles 10–15 cm (4–6 in) long.

[[

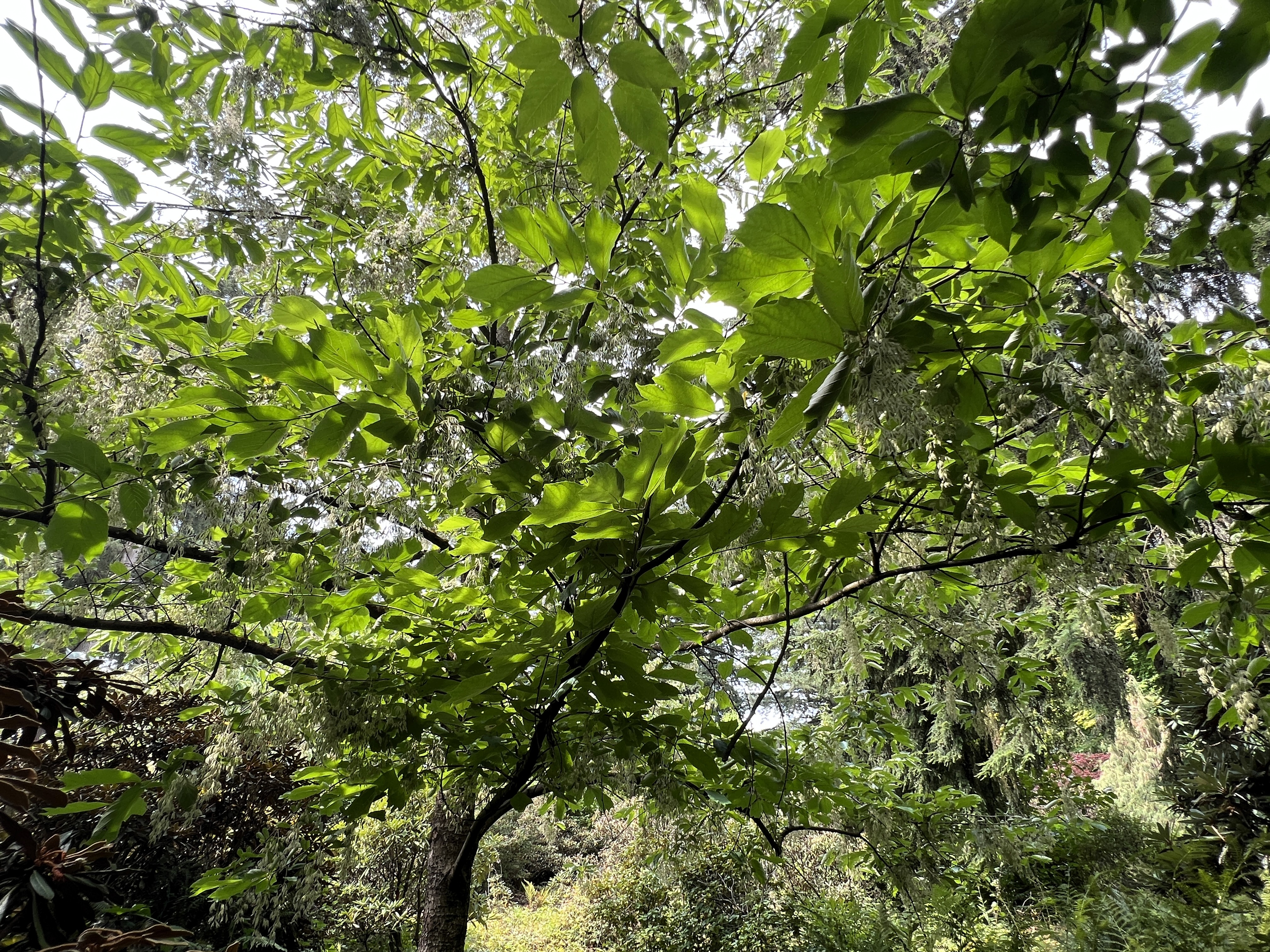
Pterostyrax psilophyllus tree

|thumb|Pterostyrax psilophyllus]]
