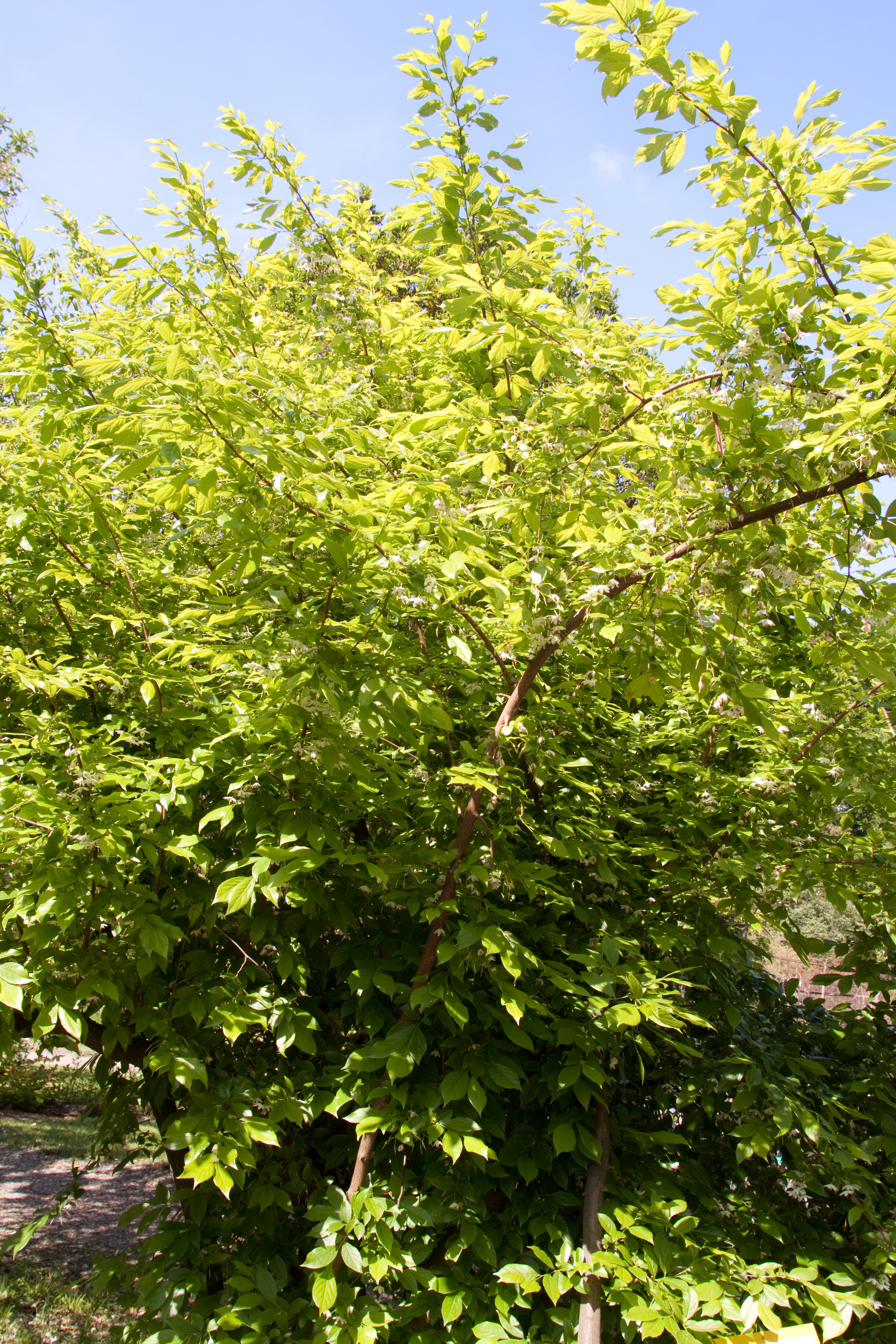

Conservation status
- Vulnerable (IUCN 2.3)

Scientific classification
- Kingdom: Plantae
- Clade: Tracheophytes
- Clade: Angiosperms
- Clade: Eudicots
- Clade: Asterids
- Order: Ericales
- Family: Styracaceae
- Genus: Sinojackia
- Species: S. xylocarpa

Binomial name
- Sinojackia xylocarpa Hu

= Sinojackia xylocarpa =

Species of flowering plant

Sinojackia xylocarpa is a species of flowering plant in the family Styracaceae. It is endemic to eastern China in Jiangsu province, where it occurs at altitudes of 500–800 m. It is threatened by habitat loss.

It is a deciduous shrub or small tree growing to 7 m tall, with a trunk up to 10 cm diameter. The leaves are alternate, simple, with a serrated margin and a 5 mm petiole; they are mostly 3–9 cm long and 2–5 cm broad and obovate to elliptic, but the leaves subtending inflorescences are smaller, 2–5 cm long and 1–2 cm broad. The inflorescences are 3–5 cm long, bearing three to five flowers with five petals.
