= Bruinsmia styracoides =

Conservation status
- Least Concern (IUCN 3.1)

Scientific classification
- Kingdom: Plantae
- Clade: Tracheophytes
- Clade: Angiosperms
- Clade: Eudicots
- Clade: Asterids
- Order: Ericales
- Family: Styracaceae
- Genus: Bruinsmia
- Species: B. styracoides

Binomial name
- Bruinsmia styracoides Boerl. & Koord.

Synonyms
- Bruinsmia celebica Koord.

Species of tree

Bruinsmia styracoides is a large tree of tropical Asia in the family Styracaceae. The specific epithet styracoides refers to the tree's resemblance to Styrax officinalis.

== Description ==
Bruinsmia styracoides grows up to 45 m (150 ft) tall with a trunk diameter of up to 2 m (7 ft) and a large, spreading crown. The grey to grey-brown bark is smooth, fissuring with age. The calyx is cup-shaped with yellow corolla lobes. The dark green fruits are pear-shaped to roundish and measure up to 1 cm (0.4 in) long.

== Distribution and habitat ==
Bruinsmia styracoides is native to Sumatra, Java, Borneo, Sulawesi, the Maluku Islands, the Philippines and New Guinea. Its habitat is forests at elevation of 450 to 2,000 m (1,500 to 6,600 ft).
