= Huodendron parviflorum =

Conservation status
- Vulnerable (IUCN 2.3)

Scientific classification
- Kingdom: Plantae
- Clade: Tracheophytes
- Clade: Angiosperms
- Clade: Eudicots
- Clade: Asterids
- Order: Ericales
- Family: Styracaceae
- Genus: Huodendron
- Species: H. parviflorum

Binomial name
- Huodendron parviflorum H.L.Li

Species of tree

Huodendron parviflorum is a species of flowering plant in the family Styracaceae. It is endemic to Vietnam.
