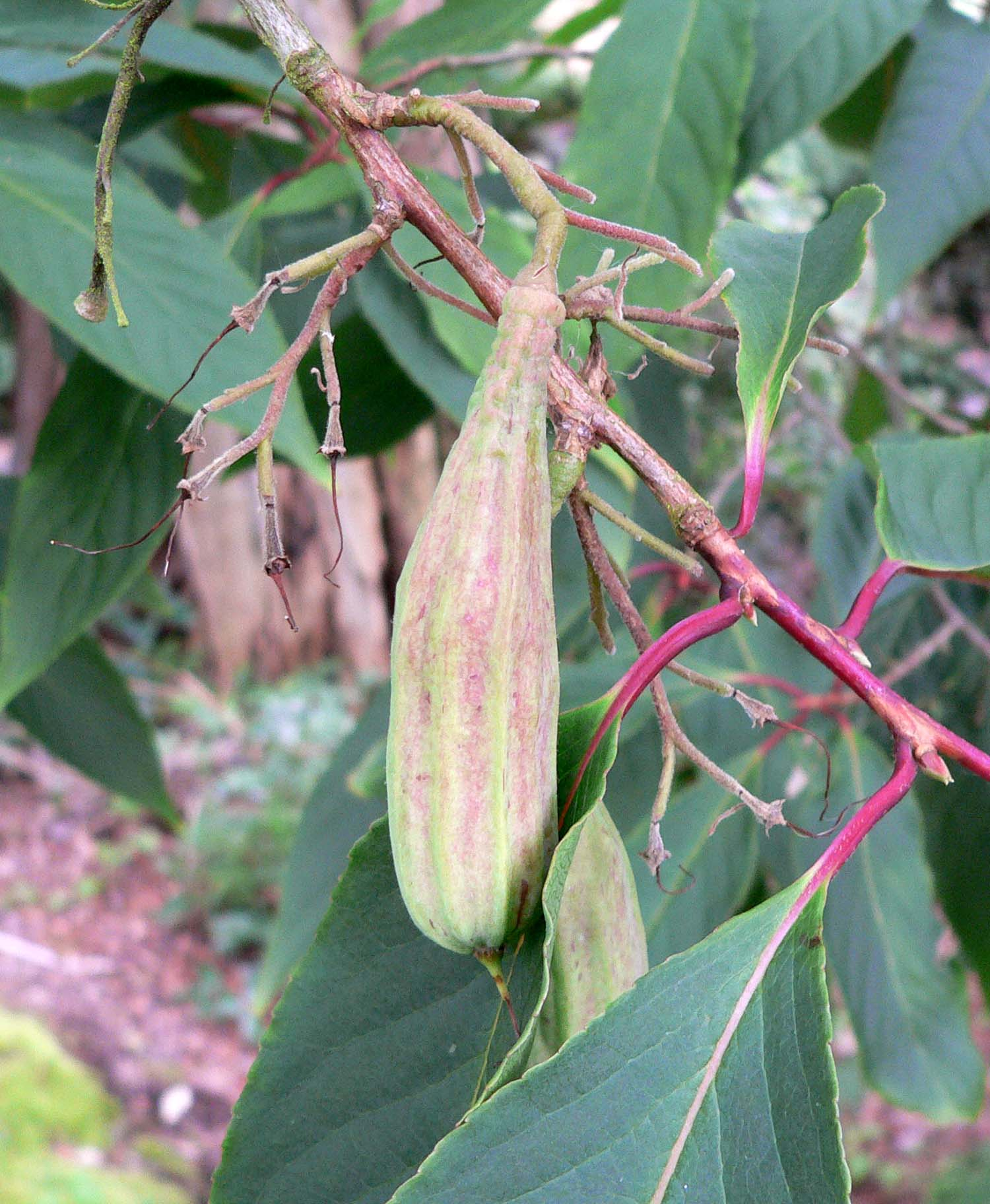
- Foliage and fruit

Conservation status
- Near Threatened (IUCN 2.3)

Scientific classification
- Kingdom: Plantae
- Clade: Embryophytes
- Clade: Tracheophytes
- Clade: Spermatophytes
- Clade: Angiosperms
- Clade: Eudicots
- Clade: Asterids
- Order: Ericales
- Family: Styracaceae
- Genus: Rehderodendron
- Species: R. macrocarpum

Binomial name
- Rehderodendron macrocarpum Hu

= Rehderodendron macrocarpum =

Species of flowering plant

Rehderodendron macrocarpum is a species of flowering plant in the family Styracaceae, native to southwestern China (Guangxi, Sichuan, Yunnan) and northern Vietnam, where it grows at altitudes of 1,000–1,500 m. It is threatened by habitat loss.

It is a deciduous small tree growing to 7–10 m tall, with a trunk up to 25 cm diameter. The leaves are alternate, simple, 7–13 cm long and 3.5–5.5 cm broad, oblong-ovate to oblong-lanceolate, with a finely serrated margin, and a reddish 7–15 mm long petiole. The flowers are 15–18 mm long, with five white petals; they are produced in cymes of four to eight together, in late spring. The fruit is a dry, woody drupe 5–7 cm long and 2.5–3 cm broad, containing a single (rarely two) seed 2–5 cm long and 5 mm broad.

It has been introduced to Europe and North America, where it is occasionally planted as an ornamental tree for its decorative flowers.
