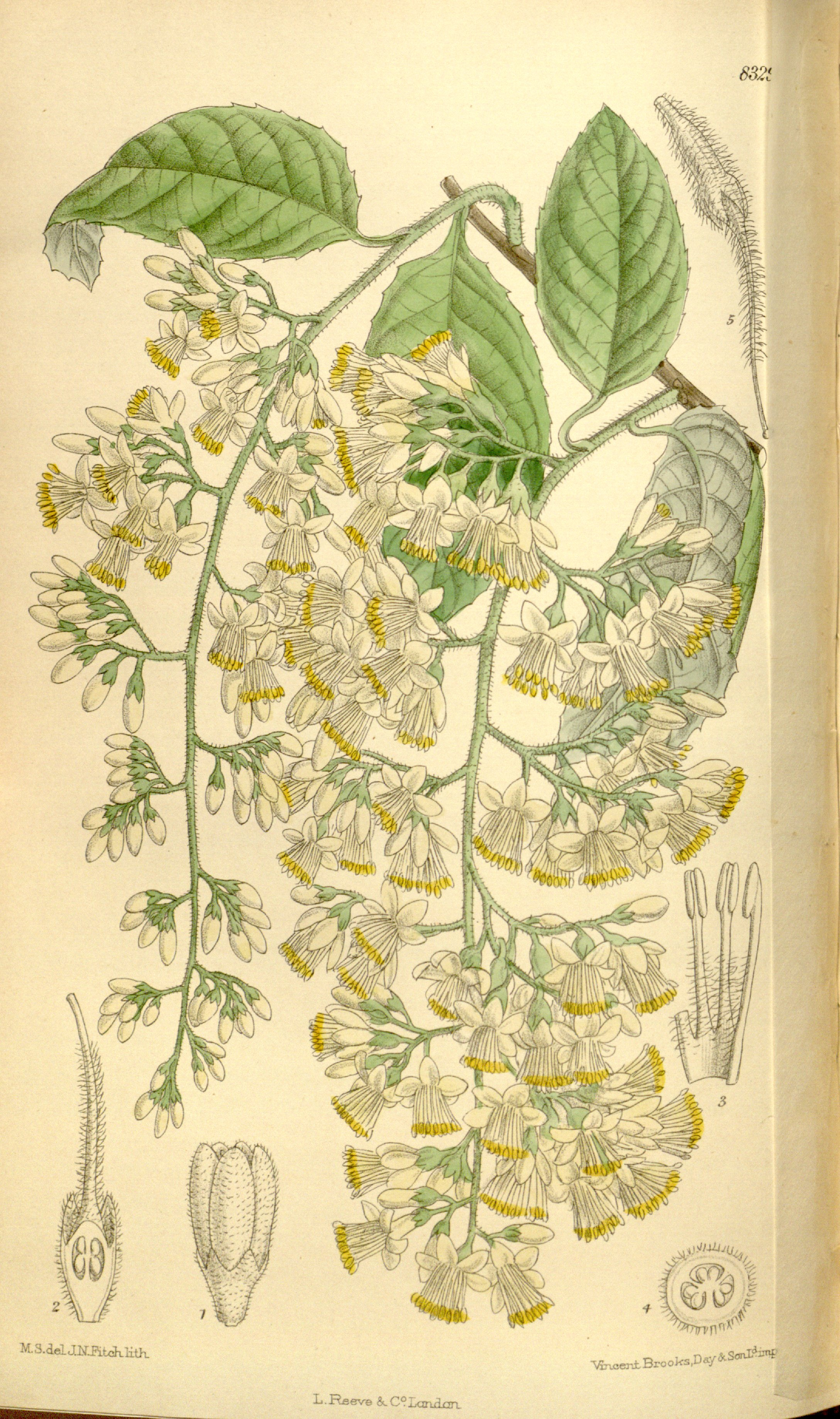
- P. hispidus, Curtis's Botanical Magazine vol.136

Scientific classification
- Kingdom: Plantae
- Clade: Tracheophytes
- Clade: Angiosperms
- Clade: Eudicots
- Clade: Asterids
- Order: Ericales
- Family: Styracaceae
- Genus: Pterostyrax
- Species: P. hispidus

Binomial name
- Pterostyrax hispidus Siebold & Zucc.

= Pterostyrax hispidus =

Species of flowering plant

Pterostyrax hispidus, the epaulette tree or fragrant epaulette tree, is a species of flowering plant in the family Styracaceae, native to China and Japan. Growing to 15 m (49 ft) tall by 12 m (39 ft) broad, it is a substantial, spreading, deciduous shrub with oval leaves up to 20 cm (8 in) long, and clusters of pure white, fragrant, pendent flowers in summer.

The Latin specific epithet hispidus (often given incorrectly as hispida or hispidum) refers to the small ribbed fruits which are covered in bristles. The common name "epaulette tree" refers to the fringed individual flowers.

In cultivation the plant has gained the Royal Horticultural Society's Award of Garden Merit.

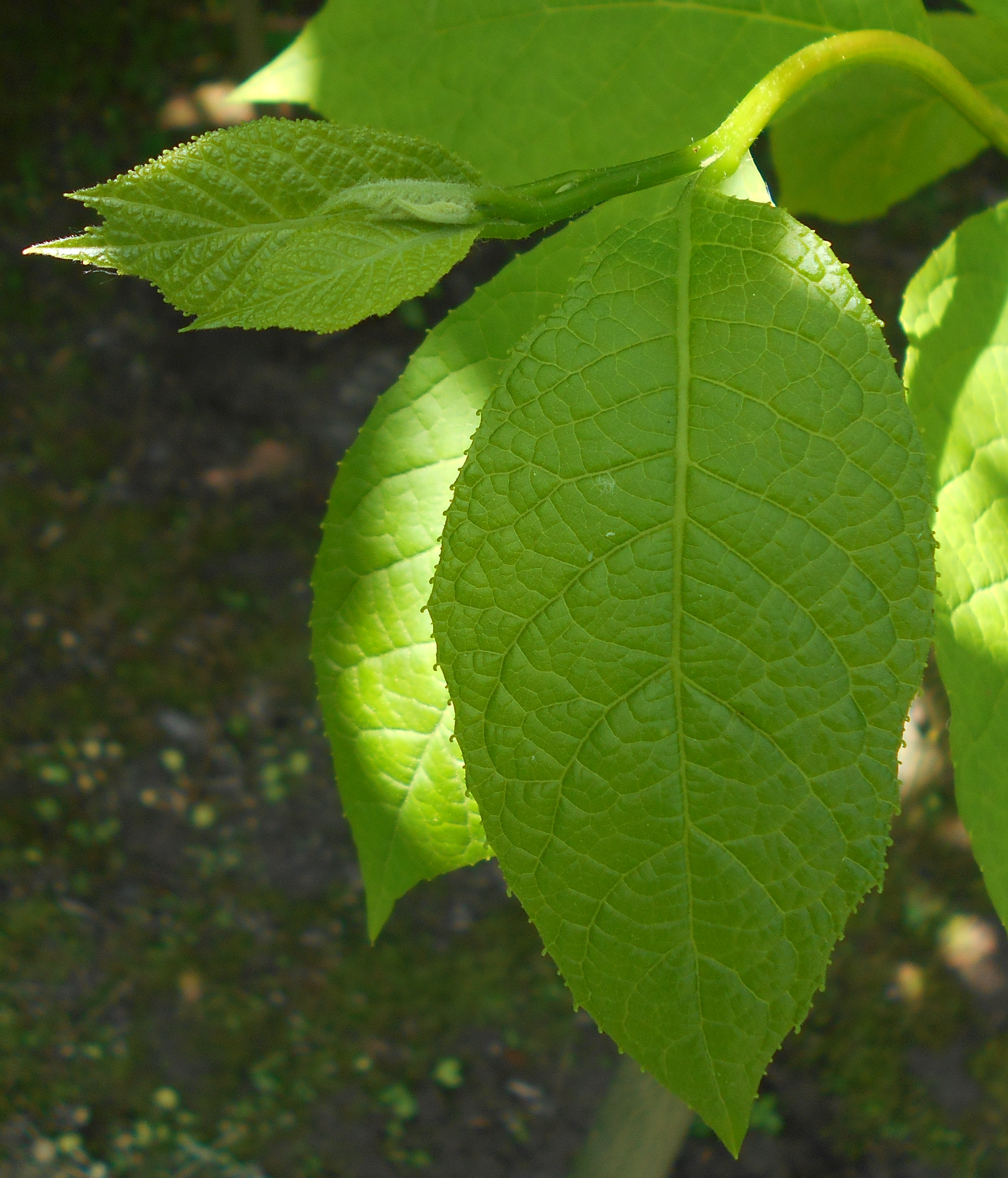

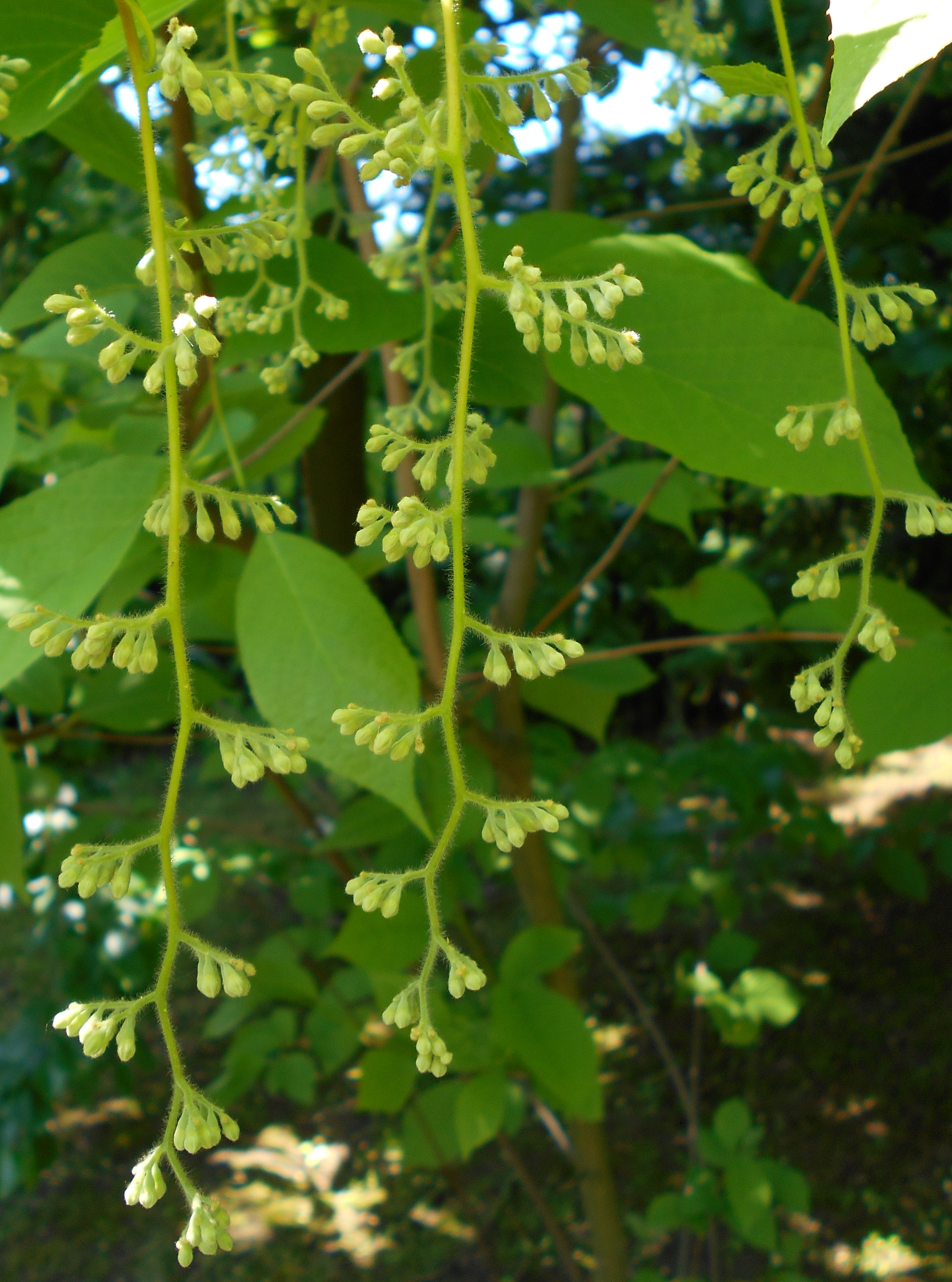

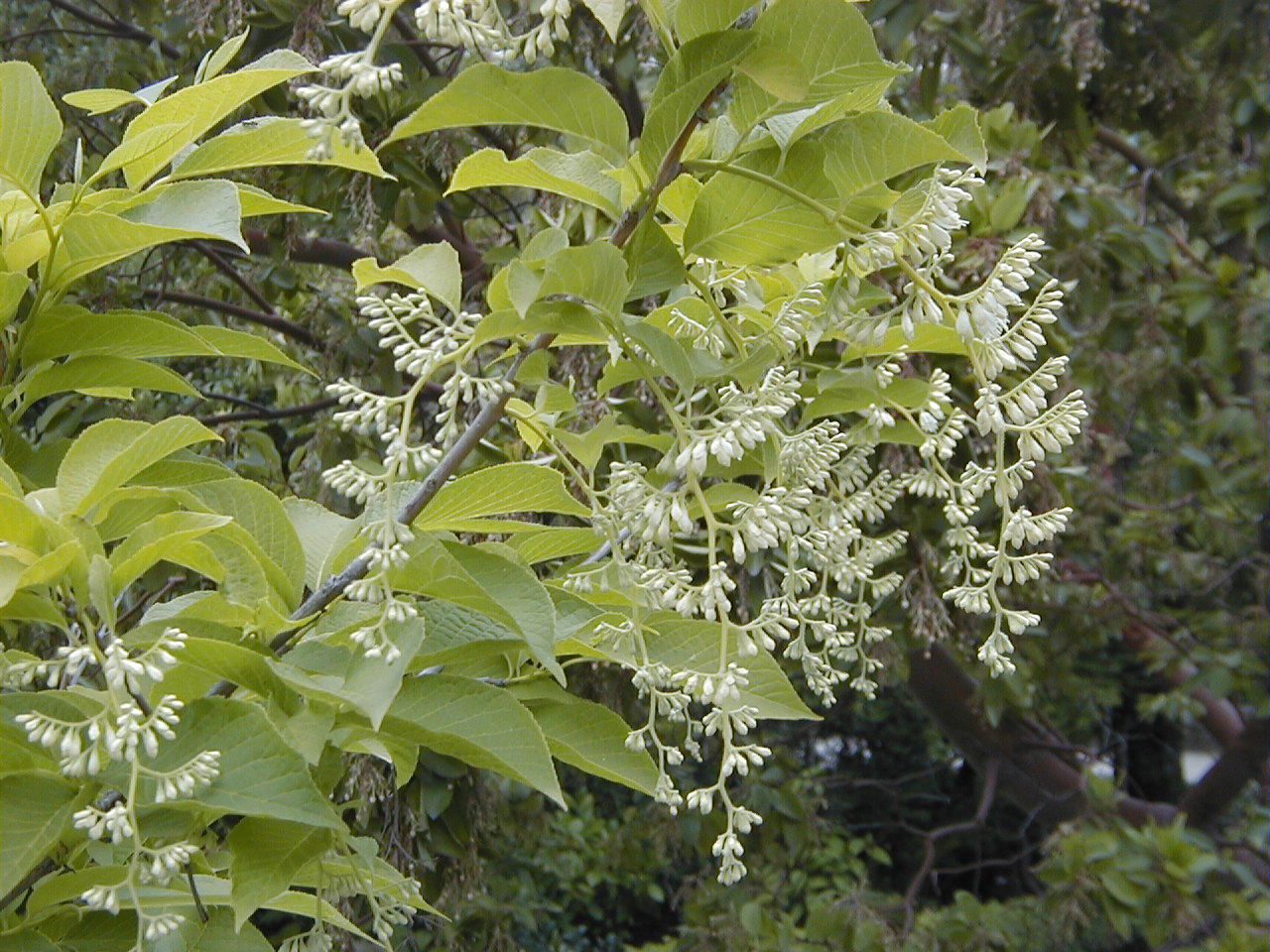

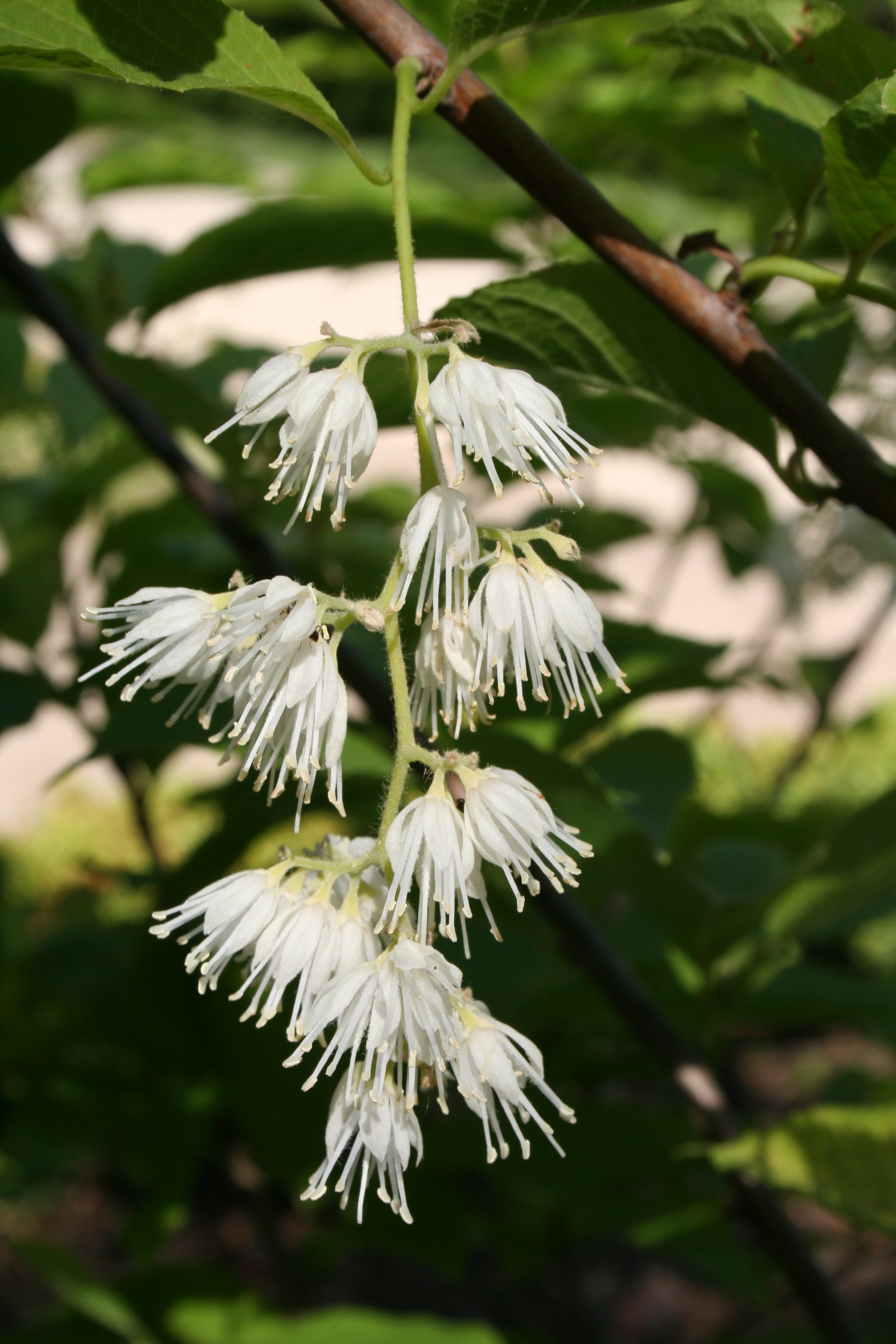

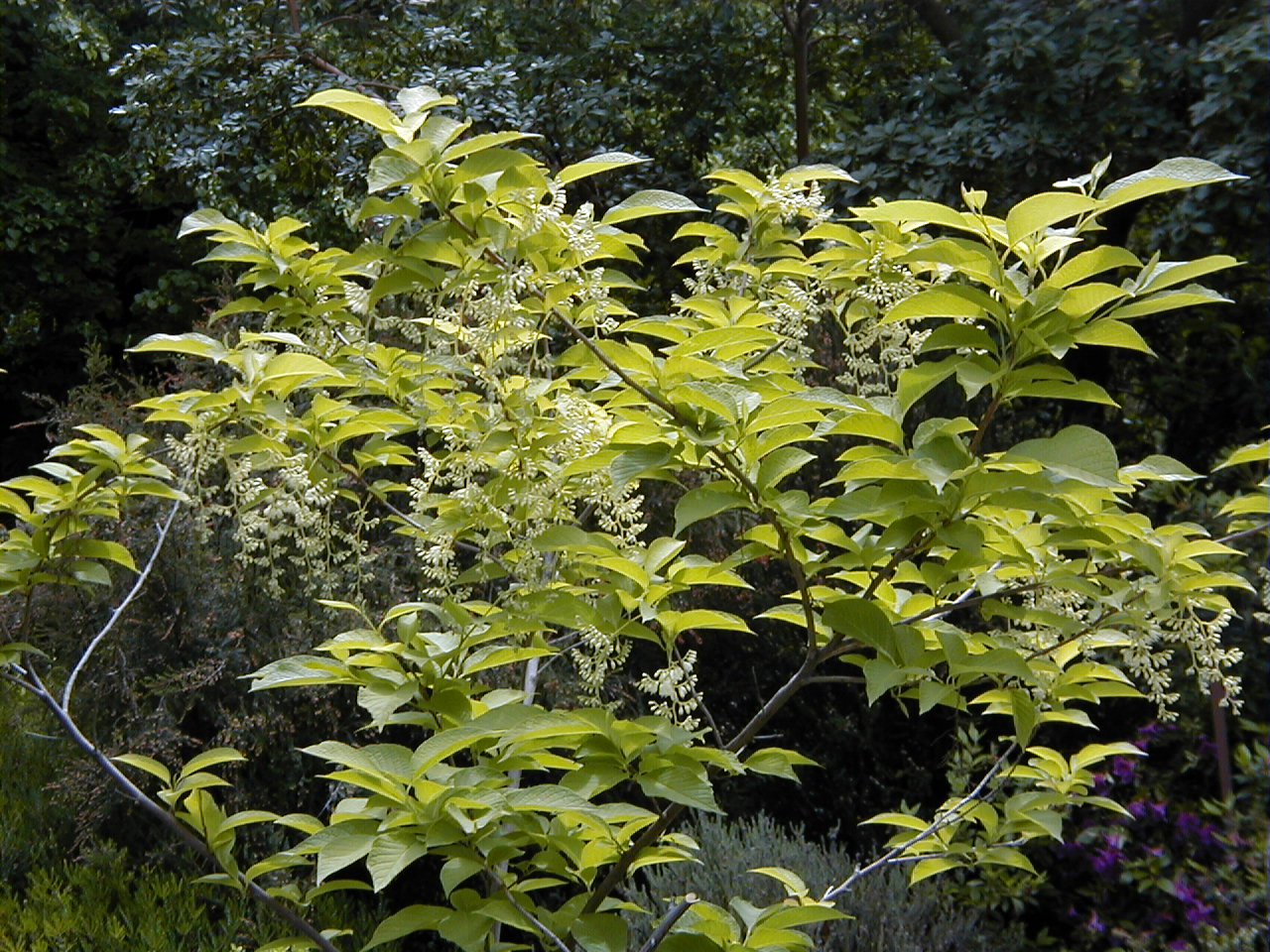

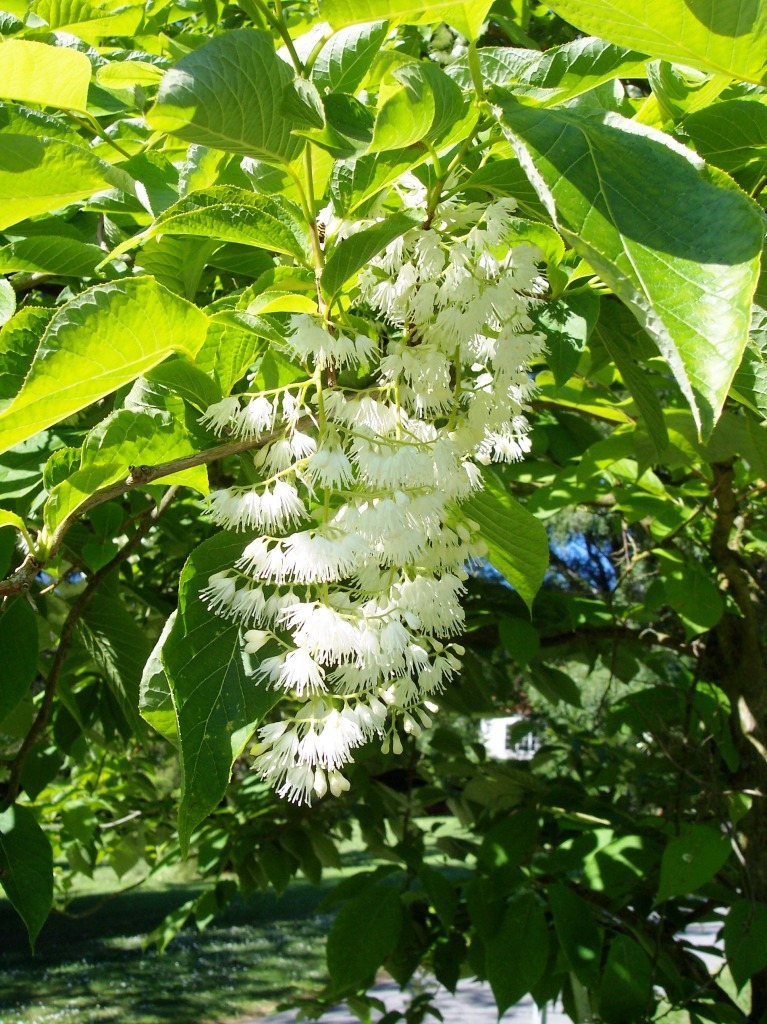

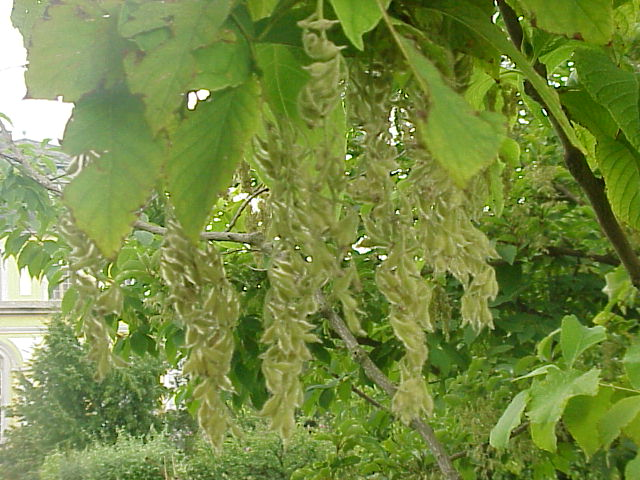

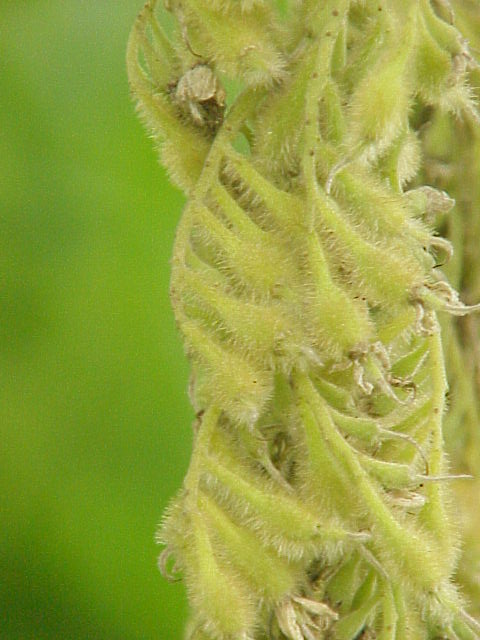

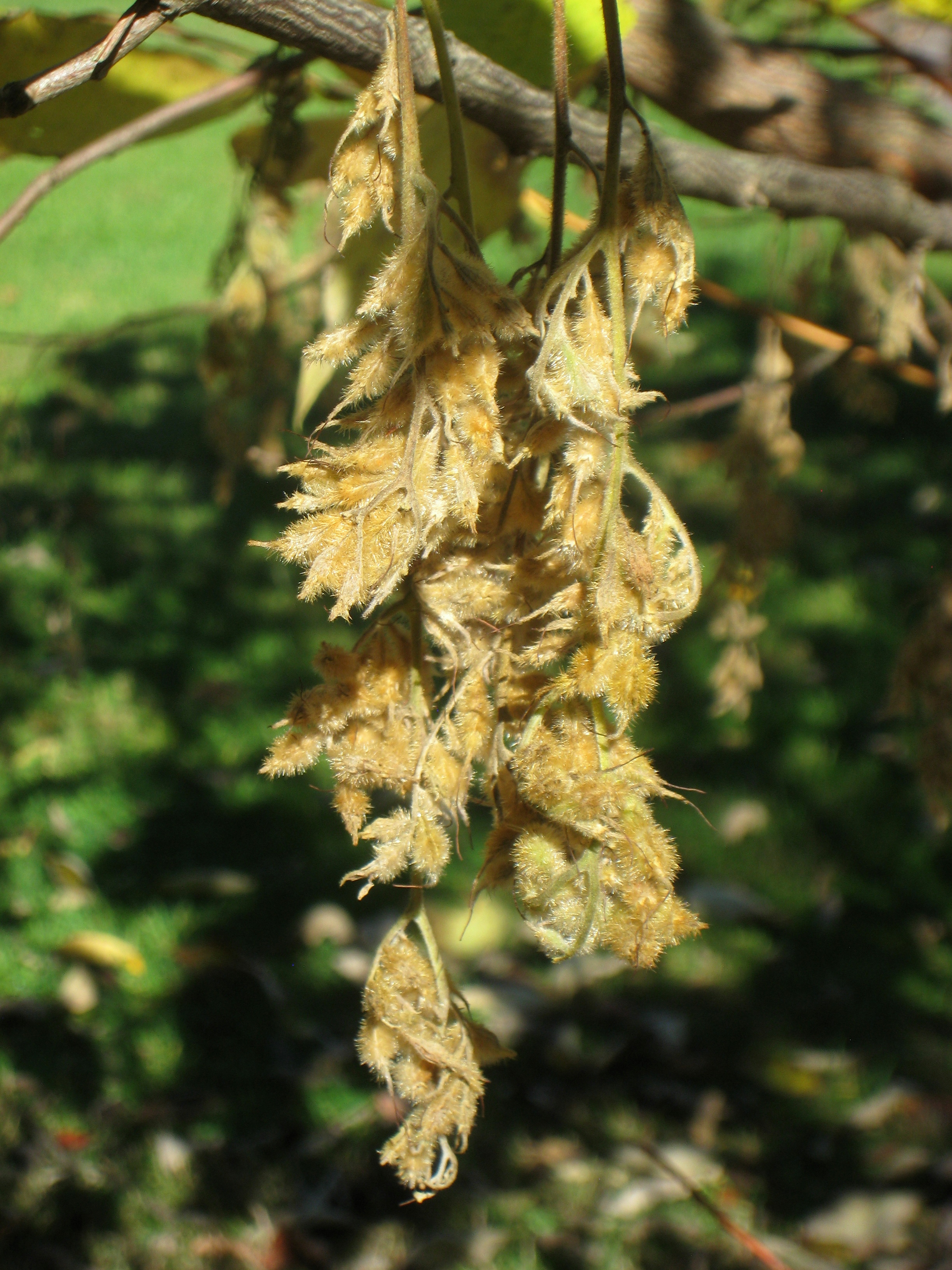
