= List of protected species in Hong Kong =

List of protected species in Hong Kong.

== Plants ==
Protected Species under Forestry Regulations Cap. 96A

	Scientific name	English common name	Chinese common name
1	Ailanthus fordii	Ailanthus	福氏臭椿
2	Amentotaxus argotaenia	Amentotaxus	穗花杉
3	Angiopteris evecta	Mules-foot fern	觀音座蓮
4	Aristolochia tagala	India birthwort	印度馬兜鈴
5	Asplenium nidus	Bird's-nest fern	雀巢芒
6	Camellia species	Camellias	各種茶花
7	Cyatheaceae species	Tree ferns	桫欏科植物
8	Dendrobenthamia hongkongensis	Hong Kong dogwood	香港四照花
9	Drosera peltata	Crescent-leaved sundew	茅膏菜
10	Enkianthus quinqueflorus	Chinese new year flower	吊鐘
11	Illicium species	Star-anises	各種八角
12	Illigera celebica	Illigera	青藤
13	Impatiens hongkongensis	Hong Kong balsam	香港鳳仙
14	Iris speculatrix	Hong Kong iris	小花鳶尾
15	Keteleeria fortunei	Keteleeria	油杉
16	Lagerstroemia species	Crape myrtles	各種紫薇
17	Lilium brownii	Chinese lily	野百合,淡紫百合
18	Magnoliaceae species	Magnolias	木蘭科植物
19	Nepenthes species	Pitcher-plants	豬籠草
20	Orchidaceae species	Orchids	各種蘭花
21	Pavetta hongkongensis	Pavetta	茜木,大沙葉
22	Platycodon grandiflorum	Balloon flower, Chinese bellflower	桔梗
23	Rehderodendron kwangtungense	Kwangtung rehdertree	廣東木瓜紅
24	Rhododendron species	Azaleas	各種杜鵑
25	Rhodoleia championi	Rhodoleia	紅苞木
26	Schoepfia chinensis	Schoepfia	青皮樹
27	Tutcheria spectabilis	Tutcheria	石筆木

== Animals ==
Protected species under Wild Animals Protection Ordinance Cap 170

	Order	Family	Scientific name	English common name	Chinese common name
			Mammalia	Mammals	哺乳類
1	Chiroptera		Chiroptera, all species of all genera and all families	Bats	蝙蝠
2	Primates		Primates, all species of all genera and all families except an individual of the family Hominidae (man)	Primates (Monkeys etc.)	靈長屬 (猴子等)
3	Pholidota	Manidae	Manis pentadactyla	Chinese pangolin	穿山甲
4	Rodentia	Hystricidae	Hystrix hodgsoni	Chinese porcupine	箭豬
5		Sciuridae	Sciuridae, all species of all genera	Squirrels	松鼠
6	Cetacea		Cetacea, all species of all genera and all families	Cetaceans (Dolphins, whales, porpoises)	鯨屬 (海豚、鯨魚、小鯨)
7	Carnivora	Canidae	Vulpes vulpes	Common red fox	紅狐
8		Viverridae	Herpestes, all species Paguma larvata Viverricula indica Viverra zibetha	Mongooses; Masked palm civet Small Indian civet Large Indian civet	獴屬 果子狸 七間狸 五間狸
8		Mustelidae	Lutra lutra Melogale moschata	Otter; Chinese ferret badger	水獺 鼬獾
9		Felidae	Felis bengalensis	Leopard cat	豹貓
10	Sirenia	Dugongidae	Dugong, all species	Dugongs	儒艮
11	Artiodactyla	Cervidae	Muntiacus reevesi	Reeves' muntjac or Barking deer	黃麂
			Aves	Birds	雀鳥類
12			Aves, all species of all genera, all families and all orders	All wild birds	所有野生雀鳥
			Reptilia	Testudines	爬蟲類
13	Testudines		Testudines, all species of all genera and all families	Chelonians (Turtles, terrapins, tortoises etc.)	龜鱉屬 (海龜、鱉、龜等)
14	Serpentes	Boidae	Python molurus bivittatus	Burmese python	緬甸蟒蛇
15	Sauria	Varanidae	Varanus salvator	Asian water monitor	水巨蜥
			Amphibia	Amphibians	兩棲類
16	Caudata	Salamandridae	Paramesotriton hongkongensis	Hong Kong newt	香港蠑螈
17	Anura	Ranidae	Amolops hongkongensis	Hong Kong cascade frog	香港瀑蛙
18		Rhacophoridae	Philautus romeri	Romer's tree frog	盧文氏蛙
			Insecta	Insects	昆蟲類
19	Lepidoptera	Papilionidae	Troides helena	Birdwing butterfly	黃扇蝶

== See also ==
- Environment of Hong Kong
