= John Lace =

John Lace may refer to:

- John Dale Lace, South African gold and diamond mining magnate
- John Henry Lace, British botanist
