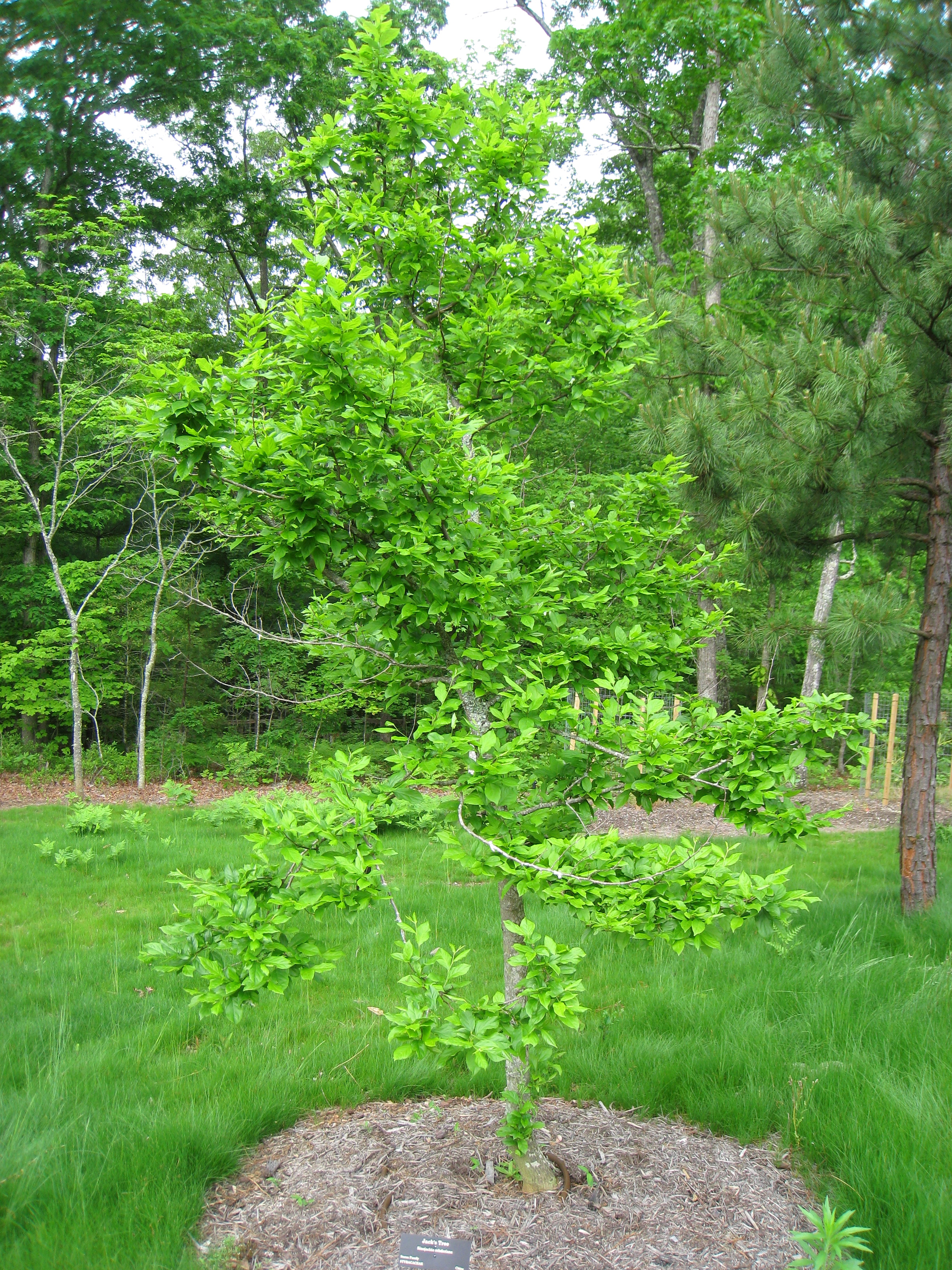
- Sinojackia rehderiana

Scientific classification
- Kingdom: Plantae
- Clade: Tracheophytes
- Clade: Angiosperms
- Clade: Eudicots
- Clade: Asterids
- Order: Ericales
- Family: Styracaceae
- Genus: Sinojackia
- Species: S. rehderiana

Binomial name
- Sinojackia rehderiana Hu

= Sinojackia rehderiana =

Species of flowering plant

Sinojackia rehderiana (狭果秤锤树, xia guo cheng chui shu) is a species of flowering plant in the genus Sinojackia.

== Endemic range ==
The plant species is endemic to Southeast China in forest thicket habitats at 500–800 metres (1,600–2,600 ft) of elevation. Populations are found in northern Guangdong, southern Hunan, and Jiangxi provinces.

== Description ==
Sinojackia rehderiana are deciduous shrubs or small multi-trunked trees growing up to 5 metres (16 ft) in height.

The species is cultivated as an ornamental plant for landscape design use in gardens.
