= Alniphyllum eberhardtii =

Conservation status
- Least Concern (IUCN 2.3)

Scientific classification
- Kingdom: Plantae
- Clade: Tracheophytes
- Clade: Angiosperms
- Clade: Eudicots
- Clade: Asterids
- Order: Ericales
- Family: Styracaceae
- Genus: Alniphyllum
- Species: A. eberhardtii

Binomial name
- Alniphyllum eberhardtii Guillaum.

Species of tree

Alniphyllum eberhardtii is a species of flowering plant in the family Styracaceae. It is found in southernmost China (southern Guangxi and southeast Yunnan), Thailand, and Vietnam.

It is a deciduous tree growing to 30 m tall. The leaves are alternate, simple, 10–18 cm long and 5–8 cm broad, oblong-lanceolate, with a serrated margin.
