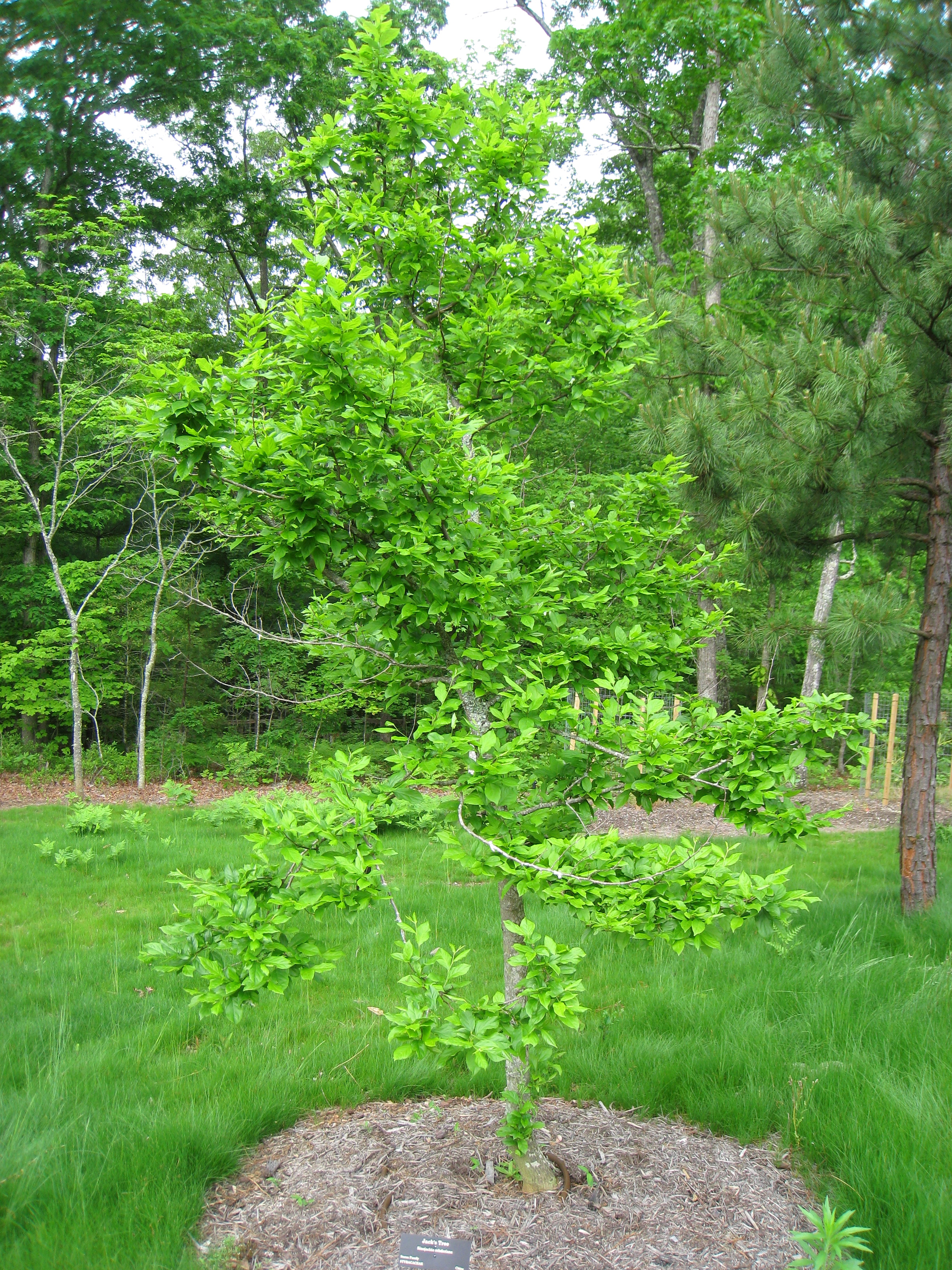
- Sinojackia rehderiana

Scientific classification
- Kingdom: Plantae
- Clade: Tracheophytes
- Clade: Angiosperms
- Clade: Eudicots
- Clade: Asterids
- Order: Ericales
- Family: Styracaceae
- Genus: Sinojackia; Hu, 1928

Species
- Sinojackia dolichocarpa C.J.Qi; Sinojackia henryi (Dummer) Merrill; Sinojackia huangmeiensis J.W.Ge & X.H.Yao; Sinojackia microcarpa C.T.Chen & G.Y.Li; Sinojackia oblongicarpa C.T.Chen & T.R.Cao; Sinojackia rehderiana Hu; Sinojackia sarcocarpa L.Q.Lou; Sinojackia xylocarpa Hu

= Sinojackia =

Genus of flowering plants

Sinojackia is a genus of five to eight species of flowering plants in the family Styracaceae, all endemic to China.

The species are deciduous shrubs or small trees growing to 4–12 m tall.

During a presentation on Chinese plant species at Chiba University's Dept. Of Horticulture on October 27, 2017, botanist Mikinori Ogisu informed the audience that less than 20 Sinojackia sarcocarpa remain in the wild. He also said he had walked in the mountains with a local and found the species.

Species

- Sinojackia dolichocarpa C.J.Qi
- Sinojackia henryi (Dummer) Merrill
- Sinojackia huangmeiensis J.W.Ge & X.H.Yao
- Sinojackia microcarpa C.T.Chen & G.Y.Li
- Sinojackia oblongicarpa C.T.Chen & T.R.Cao
- Sinojackia rehderiana Hu
- Sinojackia sarcocarpa L.Q.Lou
- Sinojackia xylocarpa Hu
