= John Henry Lace =

British botanist (1857–1918)

- Born: 17 June 1857
- Died: 9 June 1918 (aged 60); Exmouth
- Scientific career
- Fields: Botany
- Author abbrev. (botany): Lace

John Henry Lace FRS FLS (1857–1918) was a British botanist.

== Biography ==
From 1881 he worked extensively in the Forest Service of India and became its inspector-general of forests. From 1908 to 1913 he served as chief forest conservator in Burma. He made botanical collections in Afghanistan, Baluchistan, India and Burma.

While in Baluchistan he made an extensive collection of plants which resulted in the publication of "A Sketch of the Vegetation of British Baluchistan" by himself and Mr. Hemsley in Journ. Linn. Soc. xxviii. (1891) p. 288.

He married Minnie Richbell. They had three daughters, Violet Sylvia (b. 1894 in E. India), Ethel Douglas (b. 1896 in Bengal), and Dorothy Mabel (b. 1899 in Bengal). In 1920 Ethel Douglas Lace married a grandson of General Sir John Watson.

== Selected publications ==
- with W. B. Hemsley: "Sketch of Vegetation of British Baluchistan". J. Linn. Soc. 28: 288–327. 1891.
- List of trees, shrubs, and principal climbers, etc. recorded from Burma: with vernacular names (2nd ed.). 1922.
- "List of Trees, Shrubs and Principal Climbers, etc, recorded from Burma 1913". Indian For.: 369–70. 1918.
- "List of Trees, Shrubs and Principal Climbers, etc, recorded from Burma 1913". Kew Bulletin (338): 341. 1918–19.
- "List of Trees, Shrubs and Principal Climbers, etc, recorded from Burma 1913". Proc. Linn. Soc. Lond.: 56–57. 1918–19.

=== Eponyms ===
- (Acanthaceae) Thunbergia lacei Gamble
- (Apocynaceae) Aganosma lacei Raizada
- (Arecaceae) Pinanga lacei A.J.Hend.
- (Asclepiadaceae) Bidaria lacei (Craib) M.A.Rahman & Wilcock
- (Asteraceae) Uechtritzia lacei (Watt) C.Jeffrey
- (Balsaminaceae) Impatiens lacei Hook.f.
- (Clusiaceae) Hypericum lacei N.Robson
- (Cyperaceae) Fimbristylis lacei Turrill
- (Dryopteridaceae) Tectaria lacei Holttum
- (Elaeocarpaceae) Elaeocarpus lacei Craib
- (Ericaceae) Agapetes lacei Craib
- (Euphorbiaceae) Acalypha lacei Hutch.
- (Fabaceae) Paraderris lacei (Dunn) Adema
- (Gentianaceae) Swertia lacei Craib
- (Gesneriaceae) Ornithoboea lacei Craib
- (Lamiaceae) Gomphostemma lacei Mukerjee
- (Magnoliaceae) Magnolia lacei (W.W.Sm.) Figlar
- (Orchidaceae) Platanthera lacei Rolfe ex Downie
- (Poaceae) Ischaemum lacei Stapf ex Bor
- (Polygalaceae) Polygala lacei Craib
- (Primulaceae) Dionysia lacei (Hemsl. & Watt) S.Clay
- (Ranunculaceae) Delphinium lacei Munz
- (Rosaceae) Cotoneaster lacei G.Klotz
- (Rubiaceae) Ixora lacei Bremek.
- (Scrophulariaceae) Wightia lacei Craib
- (Styracaceae) Parastyrax lacei W.W.Sm.
- (Tiliaceae) Grewia lacei J.R.Drumm. & Craib
