= Alniphyllum =

Scientific classification
- Kingdom: Plantae
- Clade: Tracheophytes
- Clade: Angiosperms
- Clade: Eudicots
- Clade: Asterids
- Order: Ericales
- Family: Styracaceae
- Genus: Alniphyllum; Matsum.

Species
- See text

Genus of flowering plants

Alniphyllum is a genus of three species of flowering plants in the family Styracaceae, native to eastern Asia, from central China south to India and Vietnam.

The species are small to medium-sized deciduous trees growing to 15–30 m tall.

Species

- Alniphyllum eberhardtii Guillaum.
- Alniphyllum fortunei (Hemsl.) Makino
- Alniphyllum pterospermum Matsum.
