= Perkinsiodendron =

Scientific classification
- Kingdom: Plantae
- Clade: Tracheophytes
- Clade: Angiosperms
- Clade: Eudicots
- Clade: Asterids
- Order: Ericales
- Family: Styracaceae
- Genus: Perkinsiodendron; P.W.Fritsch

Genus of plants

Perkinsiodendron is a genus of flowering plants belonging to the family Styracaceae.

Its native range is Southern China.

Species:

- Perkinsiodendron macgregorii (Chun) P.W.Fritsch
