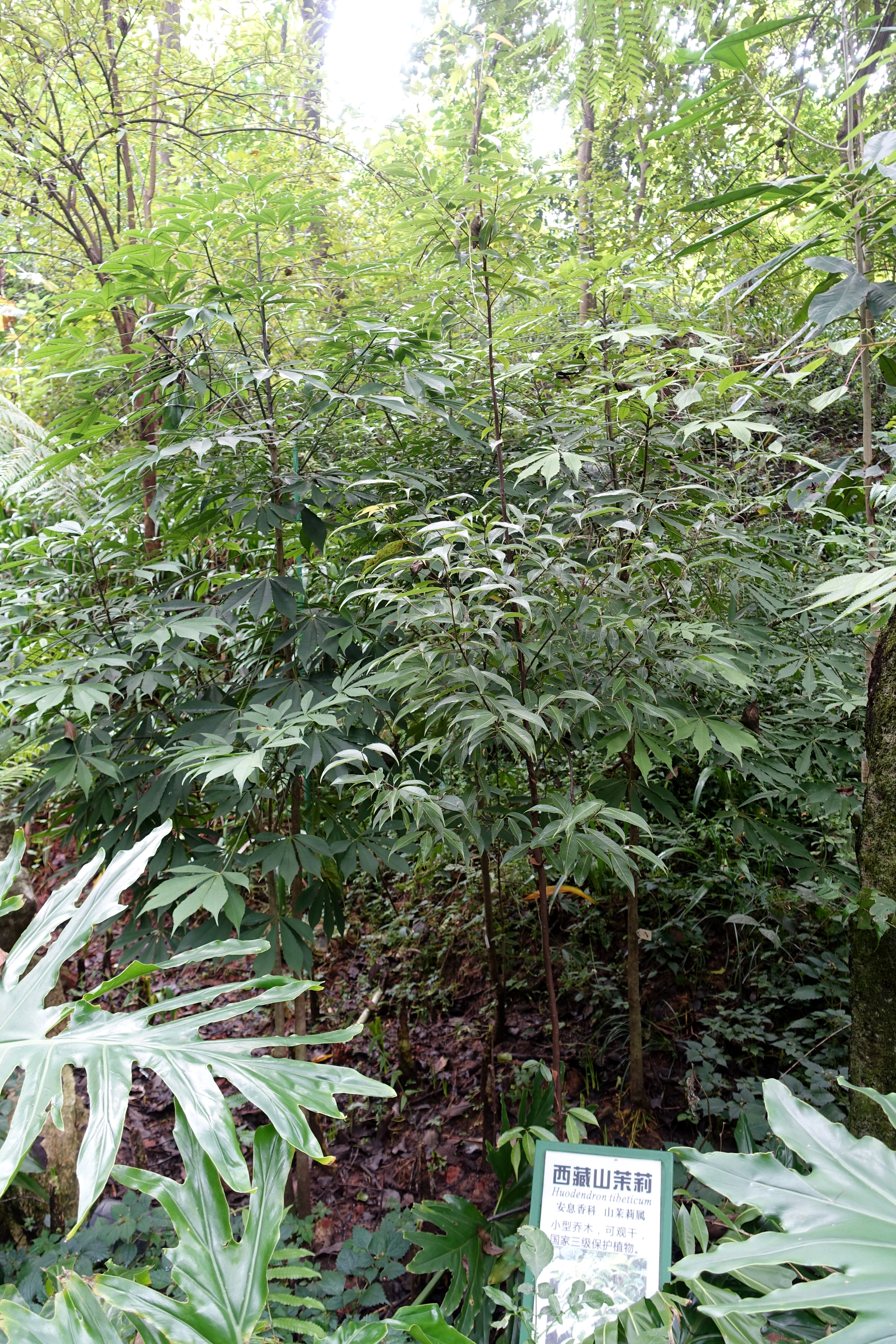
- Huodendron tibeticum

Scientific classification
- Kingdom: Plantae
- Clade: Tracheophytes
- Clade: Angiosperms
- Clade: Eudicots
- Clade: Asterids
- Order: Ericales
- Family: Styracaceae
- Genus: Huodendron; Rehder

Species
- See text

= Huodendron =

Genus of flowering plants

Huodendron is a genus of four species of flowering plants in the family Styracaceae, native to eastern Asia, from southern China south to Thailand and Vietnam.

The species are small to medium-sized deciduous trees growing to 12–25 m tall.

Species

- Huodendron biaristatum (W.W.Smith) Rehder
- Huodendron parviflorum H.L.Li
- Huodendron tibeticum (J. Anthony) Rehder
- Huodendron tomentosum Y.C.Tang ex S.M.Hwang
