= Bruinsmia =

Scientific classification
- Kingdom: Plantae
- Clade: Tracheophytes
- Clade: Angiosperms
- Clade: Eudicots
- Clade: Asterids
- Order: Ericales
- Family: Styracaceae
- Genus: Bruinsmia; Boerl. & Koord.

Species
- See text

Genus of flowering plants

Bruinsmia is a small genus of trees in the family Styracaceae.

== Description ==
Bruinsmia species grow as trees with flattened twigs. The flowers are green or white. The fruits are fleshy.

== Distribution ==
Bruinsmia species grow naturally in Nepal, India, China, Indochina, Malesia and New Guinea.

== Species ==
The Plant List and Catalogue of Life recognise 2 accepted species:

1. Bruinsmia polysperma (C.B.Clarke) Steenis
2. Bruinsmia styracoides Boerl. & Koord.
