= Pyrenaria pahangensis =

Conservation status
- Data Deficient (IUCN 3.1)

Scientific classification
- Kingdom: Plantae
- Clade: Tracheophytes
- Clade: Angiosperms
- Clade: Eudicots
- Clade: Asterids
- Order: Ericales
- Family: Theaceae
- Genus: Pyrenaria
- Species: P. pahangensis

Binomial name
- Pyrenaria pahangensis H. Keng

Species of flowering plant

Pyrenaria pahangensis is a species of plant in the family Theaceae. It is endemic to Peninsular Malaysia.
