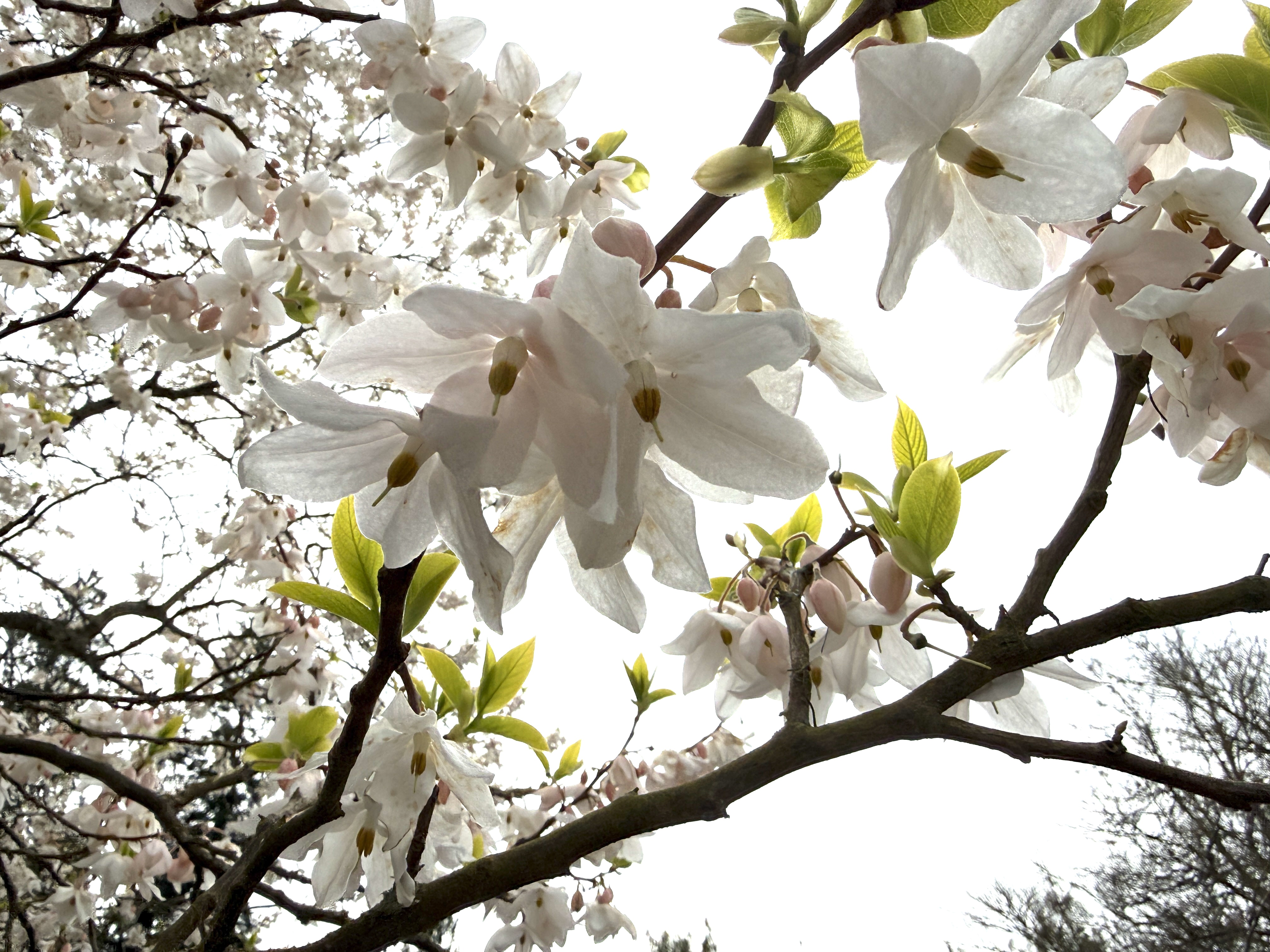
- At the UBC Botanical Garden

Scientific classification
- Kingdom: Plantae
- Clade: Tracheophytes
- Clade: Angiosperms
- Clade: Eudicots
- Clade: Asterids
- Order: Ericales
- Family: Styracaceae
- Genus: Melliodendron; Hand.-Mazz.
- Species: M. xylocarpum

Binomial name
- Melliodendron xylocarpum Hand.-Mazz.

= Melliodendron =

Genus of plants

Melliodendron is a monotypic genus of flowering plants belonging to the family Styracaceae. The only species is Melliodendron xylocarpum.

Its native range is Southern China.
