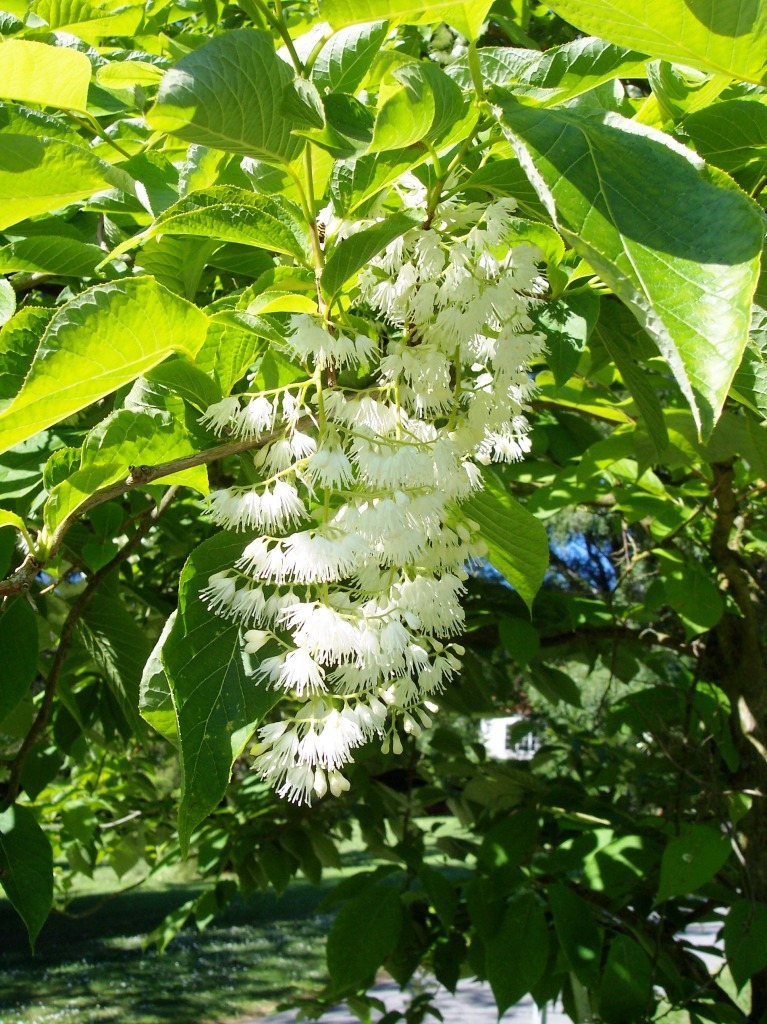
- Pterostyrax hispidus

Scientific classification
- Kingdom: Plantae
- Clade: Tracheophytes
- Clade: Angiosperms
- Clade: Eudicots
- Clade: Asterids
- Order: Ericales
- Family: Styracaceae
- Genus: Pterostyrax; Siebold & Zucc.

Species
- See text

= Pterostyrax =

Family of shrubs and trees

Pterostyrax, the epaulette tree, is a small genus of four species of deciduous large shrubs or small trees in the family Styracaceae, native to eastern Asia in China and Japan. They grow 4–12 m (13–39 ft) tall, with alternate, simple ovate leaves 6–17 cm (2–7 in) long and 4–10 cm (2–4 in) broad. The flowers are white, produced in dense panicles 8–25 cm (3–10 in) long. The fruit is an oblong dry drupe, with longitudinal ribs or narrow wings (the wings are absent in the related genus Styrax, whence the name Pterostyrax, "winged styrax").

Species

- Pterostyrax burmanicus W.Wsm.
- Pterostyrax corymbosus Siebold & Zucc. – Japan and China
- Pterostyrax hispidus – Japan
- Pterostyrax psilophyllus Diels ex Perkins – China

The species names are frequently given with feminine gender ("corymbosa", etc.); however, the genus is correctly of masculine gender.
