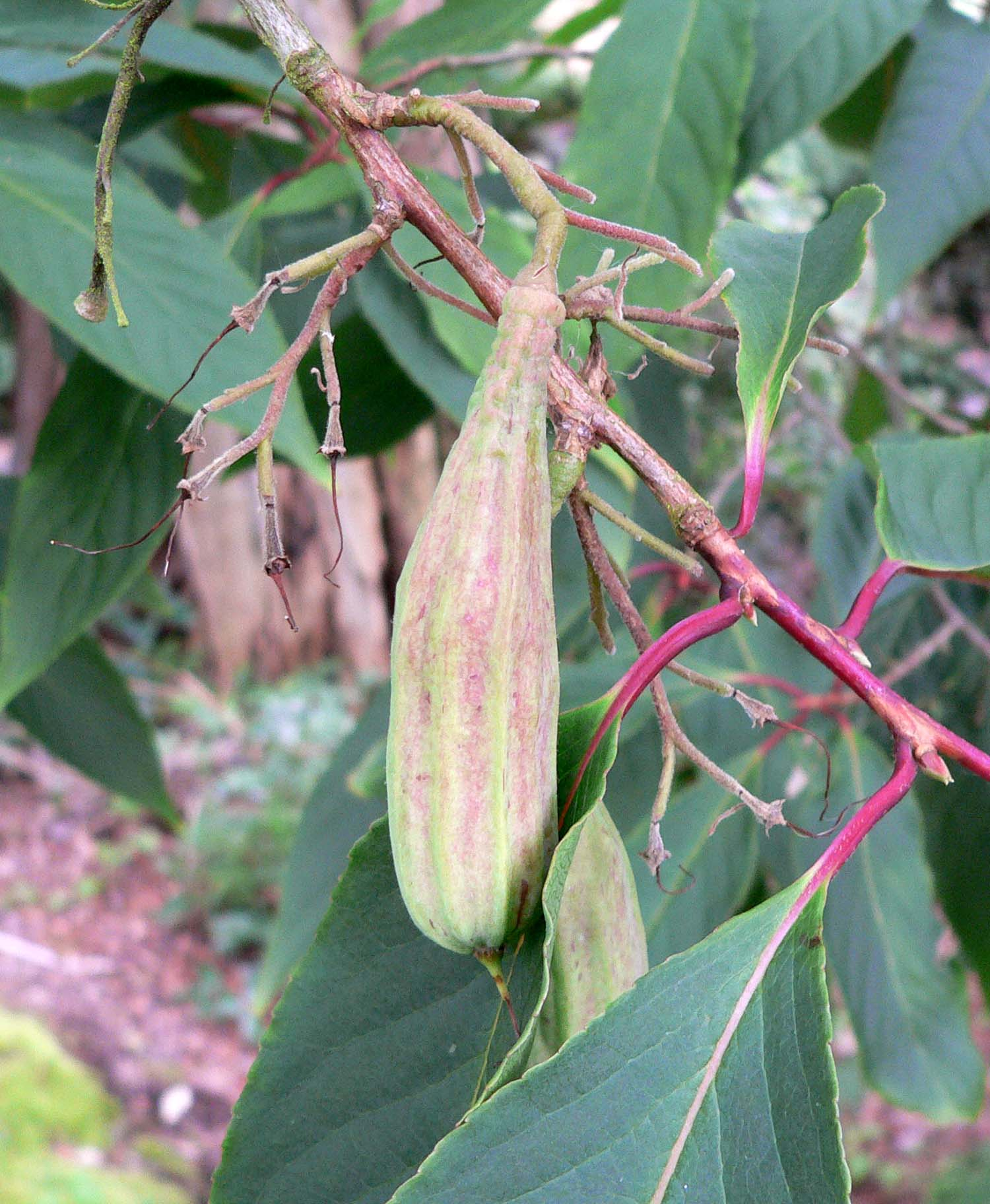
- Rehderodendron macrocarpum foliage and fruit

Scientific classification
- Kingdom: Plantae
- Clade: Tracheophytes
- Clade: Angiosperms
- Clade: Eudicots
- Clade: Asterids
- Order: Ericales
- Family: Styracaceae
- Genus: Rehderodendron; Hu

Species
- See text

= Rehderodendron =

Genus of flowering plants

Rehderodendron is a genus of five species of flowering plants in the family Styracaceae, native to southeastern Asia, from southwestern China south to Myanmar and Vietnam.

The genus name of Rehderodendron is in honour of Alfred Rehder (1863–1949), a German-American botanical taxonomist and dendrologist who worked at the Arnold Arboretum of Harvard University. It was first described and published in Sinensia Vol.2 on page 109 in 1932.

The species are small deciduous trees growing to 10–15 m tall.

Species

- Rehderodendron gongshanense Y.C.Tang
- Rehderodendron indochinense H.L.Li
- Rehderodendron kwangtungense Chun
- Rehderodendron kweichowense Hu
- Rehderodendron macrocarpum Hu
- Rehderodendron truongsonense Zhao, Wan-Yi, Fritsch, Peter W., Do, Van Truong, Fan, Qiang

== Fossil record ==
40 fossil endocarps of †Rehderodendron custodum from the early Miocene, have been found in the Kristina Mine at Hrádek nad Nisou in North Bohemia, the Czech Republic.
