= Changiostyrax =

Conservation status
- Vulnerable (IUCN 2.3)

Scientific classification
- Kingdom: Plantae
- Clade: Tracheophytes
- Clade: Angiosperms
- Clade: Eudicots
- Clade: Asterids
- Order: Ericales
- Family: Styracaceae
- Genus: Changiostyrax; C.T.Chen
- Species: C. dolichocarpus

Binomial name
- Changiostyrax dolichocarpus (C.J.Qi) C.T.Chen

Genus of flowering plants

Changiostyrax is a monotypic genus of flowering plant in the family Styracaceae. Its only member species is Changiostyrax dolichocarpus, formerly known as Sinojackia dolichocarpa.

It is endemic to central China in Hunan province, where it occurs at altitudes of 400–500 m. It is threatened by habitat loss. An exhaustive survey of its range during the decade from 1995 to 2005 revealed only six extant populations, one of which has since been destroyed.

It is a small deciduous tree growing to 10–12 m tall. The leaves are alternate, simple, 8–13 cm long and 3.5–4.8 cm broad, oblong-lanceolate, with a serrated margin and a 4–7 mm petiole.
