= Parastyrax =

Scientific classification
- Kingdom: Plantae
- Clade: Tracheophytes
- Clade: Angiosperms
- Clade: Eudicots
- Clade: Asterids
- Order: Ericales
- Family: Styracaceae
- Genus: Parastyrax; W.W.Sm.

Genus of plants

Parastyrax is a genus of flowering plants belonging to the family Styracaceae.

Its native range is Southern Central China to Myanmar.

== Species ==
Species:

- Parastyrax lacei (W.W.Sm.) W.W.Sm.
- Parastyrax macrophyllus C.Y.Wu & K.M.Feng
