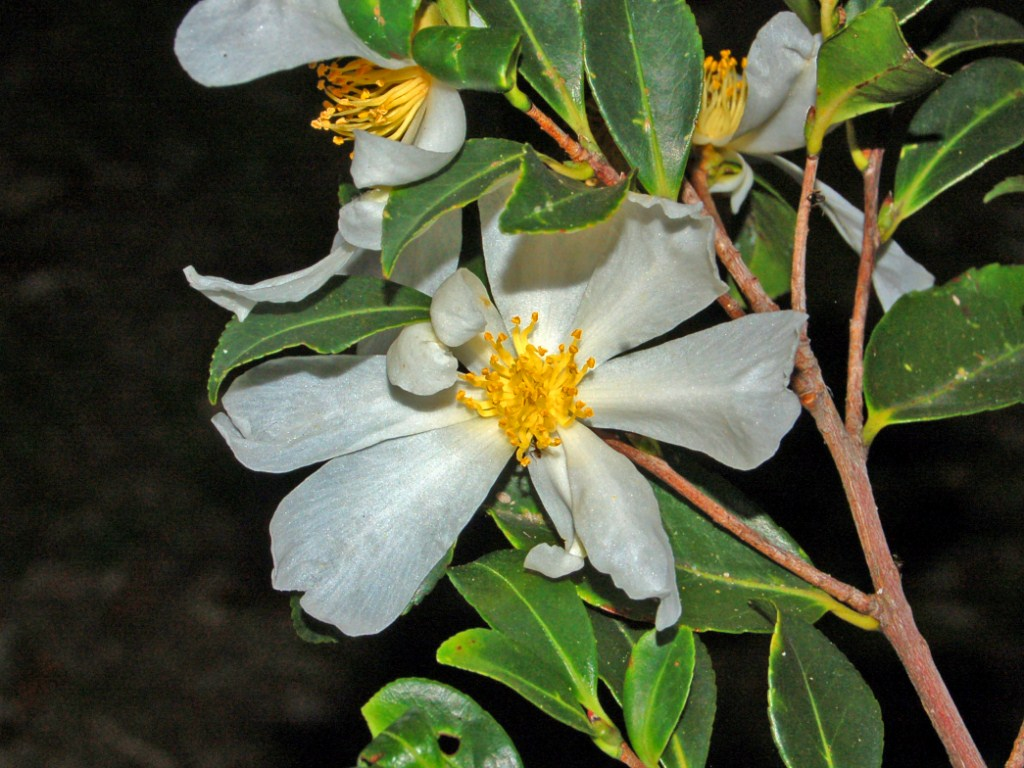

Scientific classification
- Kingdom: Plantae
- Clade: Tracheophytes
- Clade: Angiosperms
- Clade: Eudicots
- Clade: Asterids
- Order: Ericales
- Family: Theaceae
- Genus: Pyrenaria
- Species: P. microcarpa

Binomial name
- Pyrenaria microcarpa (Dunn) H.Keng

Synonyms
- Of the species: Tutcheria microcarpa Dunn; Of var. microcarpa: List: Camellia shinkoensis (Hayata) Cohen-Stuart; Camellia virgata (Koidz.) Makino & Nemoto; Pyrenaria microcarpa var. shinkoensis (Hayata) T.L.Ming & S.X.Yang; Pyrenaria microcarpa var. tenuifolia (Hung T.Chang) T.L.Ming & S.X.Yang; Pyrenaria shinkoensis (Hayata) H.Keng; Pyrenaria virgata (Koidz.) H.Keng; Thea shinkoensis Hayata; Thea virgata Koidz.; Tutcheria shinkoensis (Hayata) Nakai; Tutcheria tenuifolia Hung T.Chang; Tutcheria virgata (Koidz.) Nakai; Of var. ovalifolia: List: Camellia buisanensis Sasaki; Camellia sinensis subsp. buisanensis (Sasaki) S.Y.Lu & Y.P.Yang; Camelliastrum buisanense (Sasaki) Nakai; Pyrenaria buisanensis (Sasaki) C.F.Hsieh, Sheng Z.Yang & M.H.Su; Pyrenaria ovalifolia (H.L.Li) H.Keng; Pyrenaria symplocifolia (Merr. & F.P.Metcalf) H.Keng; Thea buisanensis (Sasaki) F.P.Metcalf; Tutcheria ovalifolia H.L.Li; Tutcheria symplocifolia Merr. & F.P.Metcalf; Tutcheria taiwanica Hung T.Chang & S.X.Ren

= Pyrenaria microcarpa =

Species of flowering plant

Pyrenaria microcarpa is an evergreen plant in the family Theaceae. It is native from southern mainland China, east to Taiwan, and south to Myanmar and Vietnam.

== Description ==
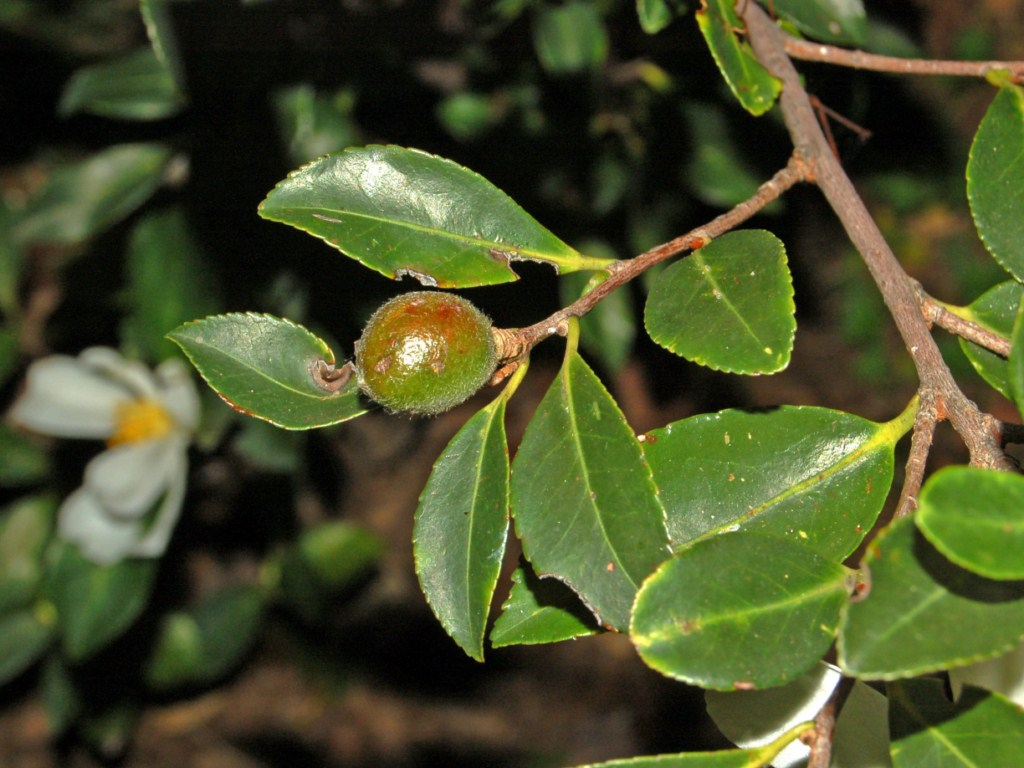
Leaves and fruit

Pyrenaria microcarpa is a shrub or medium-sized tree reaching a height of approximately 1–15 m (3–49 ft). Its leaves are leathery, elliptic, obovate or oblong-lanceolate, with a serrate margin, and are about 8–13 cm (3.1–5.1 in) long. Its flowers are axillary, solitary, with five white or pale yellow petals, about 2–2.5 cm (0.8–1.0 in) across. Its fruits are more-or-less ovoid or globose capsules about 1.5–2 cm (0.6–0.8 in) long, with three chestnut brown seeds in each of the three locules. The flowering period extends from April through July, while the fruits ripe from August up to November.

== Varieties ==
As of March 2024, Plants of the World Online accepted two varieties:

- Pyrenaria microcarpa var. microcarpa – throughout the range of the species
- Pyrenaria microcarpa var. ovalifolia (H.L.Li) T.L.Ming & S.X.Yang – Guangdong, Fujian, Hainan, north Taiwan

== Distribution and habitat ==
Pyrenaria microcarpa is native to south-central and southeast China, Hainan, Myanmar, the Ryukyu Islands (Nansei-shoto), Taiwan, and Vietnam. It grows in mountain forests or along streams, at an elevation of about 300–1,000 metres (980–3,280 ft) above sea level.
