= Forests and Countryside Ordinance =

Legislation of Hong Kong

Legislative Council of Hong Kong
- Long title: An Ordinance to consolidate and amend the law relating to forests and plants, and to provide for the protection of the countryside.
- Citation: Cap. 96
- Enacted by: Legislative Council of Hong Kong

Legislative history
- Introduced by: Attorney General C. G. Alabaster
- First reading: 23 June 1937
- Second reading: 28 July 1937
- Third reading: 28 July 1937

Amended by
- 1948, 1969, 1970, 1972, 1974, 1977, 1981, 1982, 1983, 1984, 1992, 1993, 1996, 1997, 1998, 1999, 2000, 2002, 2007
- Status: Current legislation

The Forests and Countryside Ordinance is a Hong Kong ordinance "to consolidate and amend the law relating to forests and plants, and to provide for the protection of the countryside".

== Prohibited acts ==
Under the Ordinance, no people, without lawful authority or excuse are allowed to:

- cut grass, remove turf or earth, rake pine needles;
- pluck or damage any bud, blossom, or leaf of any tree, shrub, or plant;
- trespass or pasture cattle or goats or permit cattle or goats to trespass;
- fell, cut, burn or otherwise destroy any trees or growing plants,

..in any forest (any area of Government land covered with selfgrown trees) or plantation (any area of Government land which has been planted with trees or shrubs or sown with the seeds of trees or shrubs) of Hong Kong.

== Forestry Regulations Cap. 96A ==
Forestry Regulations Cap. 96A is a part of Forests and Countryside Ordinance Cap.96. Under the regulations, it is illegal to sell, offer for sale, or have in one's possession or under one's custody or control any portion without legal excuse.

== See also ==
- List of protected species in Hong Kong
