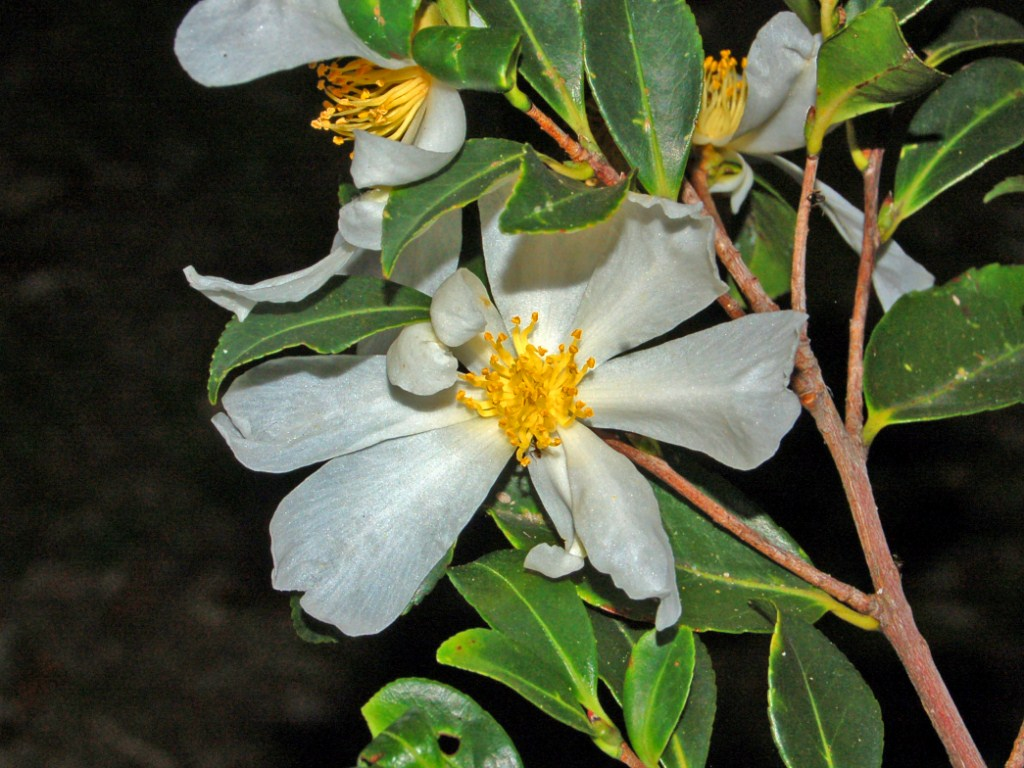
- Pyrenaria microcarpa

Scientific classification
- Kingdom: Plantae
- Clade: Embryophytes
- Clade: Tracheophytes
- Clade: Angiosperms
- Clade: Eudicots
- Clade: Asterids
- Order: Ericales
- Family: Theaceae
- Genus: Pyrenaria; Blume (1827)

Type species
- Pyrenaria serrata

Synonyms
- Dubardella H.J.Lam (1925); Eusynaxis Griff. (1854); Glyptocarpa Hu (1965); Parapyrenaria Hung T.Chang (1963); Sinopyrenaria Hu (1956); Tutcheria Dunn (1908)

= Pyrenaria =

Genus of plants

Pyrenaria is a genus of flowering plants in the family Theaceae. It includes 27 species native to tropical Asia, ranging from the eastern Indian subcontinent to Indochina, western Malesia, southern China, and Taiwan.

== Species ==
As of March 2025, the following species are accepted:

| Image | Scientific name | Distribution |
|---|---|---|
| | Pyrenaria acuminata Planch. ex Choisy 1855 | Malaya to Sumatera |
| | Pyrenaria attenuata (Blume) Seem. 1859 | Bangladesh, Myanmar |
| | Pyrenaria barringtoniifolia (Griff.) Seem. 1859 | India (Assam), Bangladesh |
| | Pyrenaria cherrapunjeana Mir 2017 | India (Assam) |
| | Pyrenaria diospyricarpa Kurz 1873 | India (Assam), Bangladesh, China (Yunnan), Laos, Malaya, Myanmar, Thailand, Vietnam |
| | Pyrenaria hirta (Hand.-Mazz.) H.Keng 1972 | China (Guangdong, Guangxi, Guizhou, Hubei, Hunan, Jiangxi, Yunnan), Vietnam |
| | Pyrenaria johorensis H.Keng 1980 | Peninsular Malaysia |
| | Pyrenaria jonquieriana Laness. 1889 | Laos, Vietnam, China (Hainan, Yunnan) |
| | Pyrenaria khasiana R.N.Paul 1979 | China (Xizang), India (Assam) |
| | Pyrenaria kinibaluensis (H.J.Lam) H.Keng 1976 | Borneo |
| | Pyrenaria kwangsiensis Hung T.Chang 1983 | China (Guangxi) |
| | Pyrenaria laotica Gagnep. 1942 | Laos |
| | Pyrenaria maculatoclada (Y.K.Li) S.X.Yang 2005 | China (Guizhou, Guangxi) |
| | Pyrenaria menglaensis G.D.Tao 1983 | China (Yunnan) |
| | Pyrenaria microcarpa (Dunn) H.Keng | China (Anhui, Fujian, Guangdong, Guangxi, Guizhou, Hainan, Jiangxi, Taiwan, Zhejiang), Japan (Ryukyu Islands), Vietnam |
| | Pyrenaria microphylla Pit. 1910 | Laos |
| | Pyrenaria mindanaensis Merr. 1922 | Philippines (Mindano) |
| | Pyrenaria oblongicarpa Hung T.Chang 1983 | China (Yunnan) |
| | Pyrenaria pahangensis H.Keng 1972 | Peninsular Malaysia |
| | Pyrenaria pingpienensis (Hung T.Chang) S.X.Yang & T.L.Ming 1997 | China (Yunnan, Guizhou) |
| | Pyrenaria serrata Blume 1827 | Bangladesh, Borneo, Jawa, Malaya, Myanmar, Sulawesi, Sumatera, Vietnam |
| | Pyrenaria sophiae (Hu) S.X.Yang & T.L.Ming 1997 | China (Yunnan) |
| | Pyrenaria spectabilis (Champ.) C.Y.Wu & S.X.Yang 2005 | China (Guangxi, Guangdong, Fujian), Vietnam |
| | Pyrenaria tawauensis H.Keng 1972 | Borneo (Sabah) |
| | Pyrenaria villosula Miq. 1861 | Sumatera |
| | Pyrenaria viridifolia Symington ex H.Keng 1980 | Peninsular Malaysia |
| | Pyrenaria wuana (Hung T.Chang) S.X.Yang 2005 | China (Guangxi, Guangdong) |
