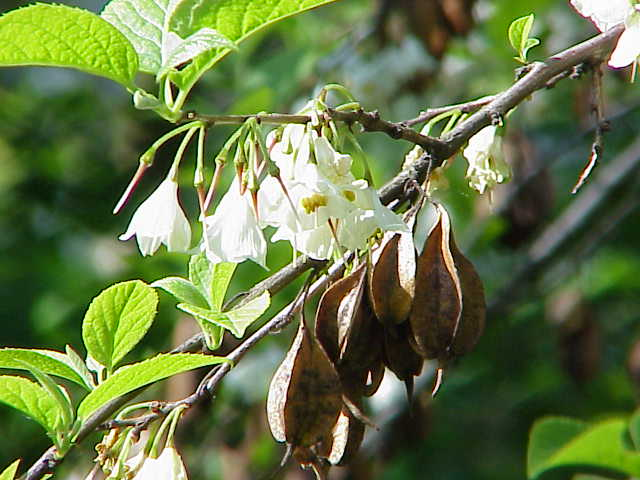
- Halesia carolina

Scientific classification
- Kingdom: Plantae
- Clade: Tracheophytes
- Clade: Angiosperms
- Clade: Eudicots
- Clade: Asterids
- Order: Ericales
- Family: Styracaceae; Dumortier

Genera
- See text

= Styracaceae =

Family of flowering plants

The Styracaceae are a small family of flowering plants in the order Ericales, containing 12 genera and about 160 species of trees and shrubs. The family occurs in warm temperate and subtropical regions of the Northern Hemisphere.

The family is characterised by spirally arranged simple leaves with no stipules; symmetrical white flowers with a corolla of two to five (sometimes seven) fused petals; and the fruit usually is a dry capsule, sometimes winged, less often a fleshy drupe, with one or two seeds.

Most are large shrubs to small trees 3–15 m tall, but Halesia monticola (H. carolina var. monticola) is larger, with trees 39 m tall known in the Great Smoky Mountains National Park in North Carolina.

== Genera ==
Several genera include species popular as ornamental trees valued for their decorative white flowers. Benzoin resin, used in herbal medicine and perfumes, is extracted from the bark of Styrax species.

- Styracaceae
  - - - - - - - - Sinojackia
                - Pterostyrax
              - Changiostyrax
            - - Perkinsiodendron
              - Rehderodendron
          - Melliodendron
        - - Halesia
          - Parastyrax
      - - Alniphyllum
        - Bruinsmia
    - Huodendron
  - Styrax

List of Genera

- Alniphyllum Matsum. (three species)
- Bruinsmia Boer. & Koord. (two species)
- Changiostyrax C.T.Chen (one species)
- Halesia J.Ellis ex L. (three to five species)
- Huodendron Rehder (four species)
- Melliodendron Hand.-Mazz. (one species)
- Parastyrax W.W.Sm. (two species)
- Perkinsiodendron P.W.Fritsch (one species)
- Pterostyrax Siebold & Zucc. (four species)
- Rehderodendron Hu (five species)
- Sinojackia Hu (five species)
- Styrax L. (about 130 species)

The genus Pamphilia, sometimes regarded as distinct, is now included within Styrax on genetic data. Phylogenetic studies suggest Halesia is not monophyletic and one species has now been transferred to the new genus Perkinsiodendron.

== Gallery ==
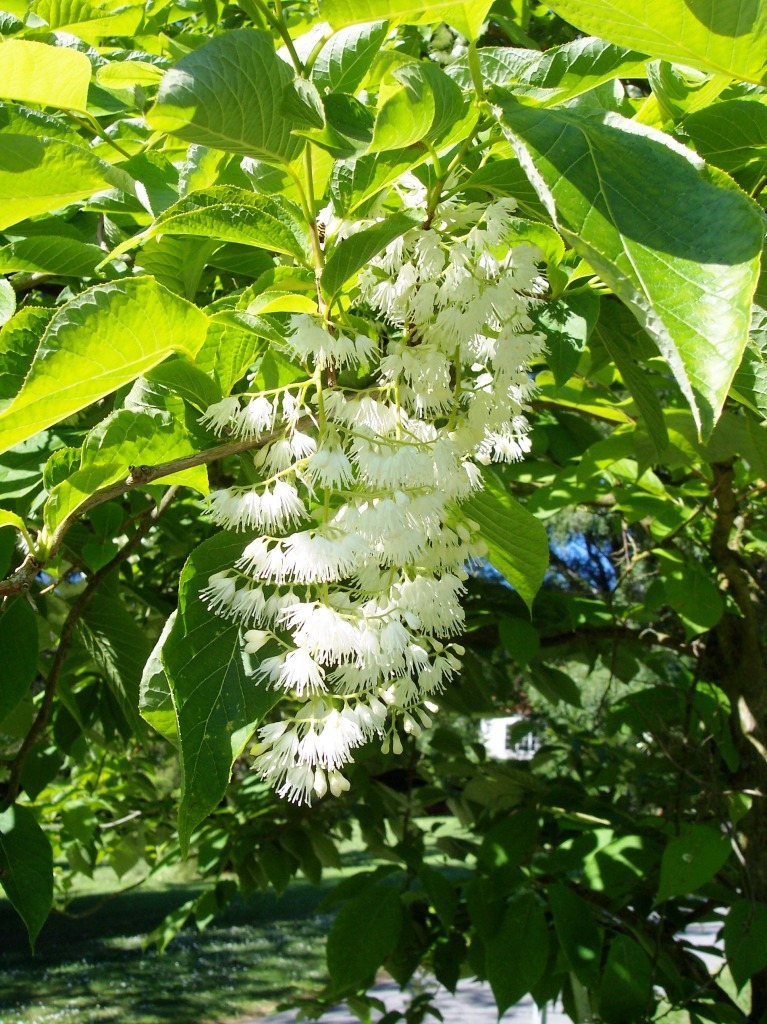
Pterostyrax hispida

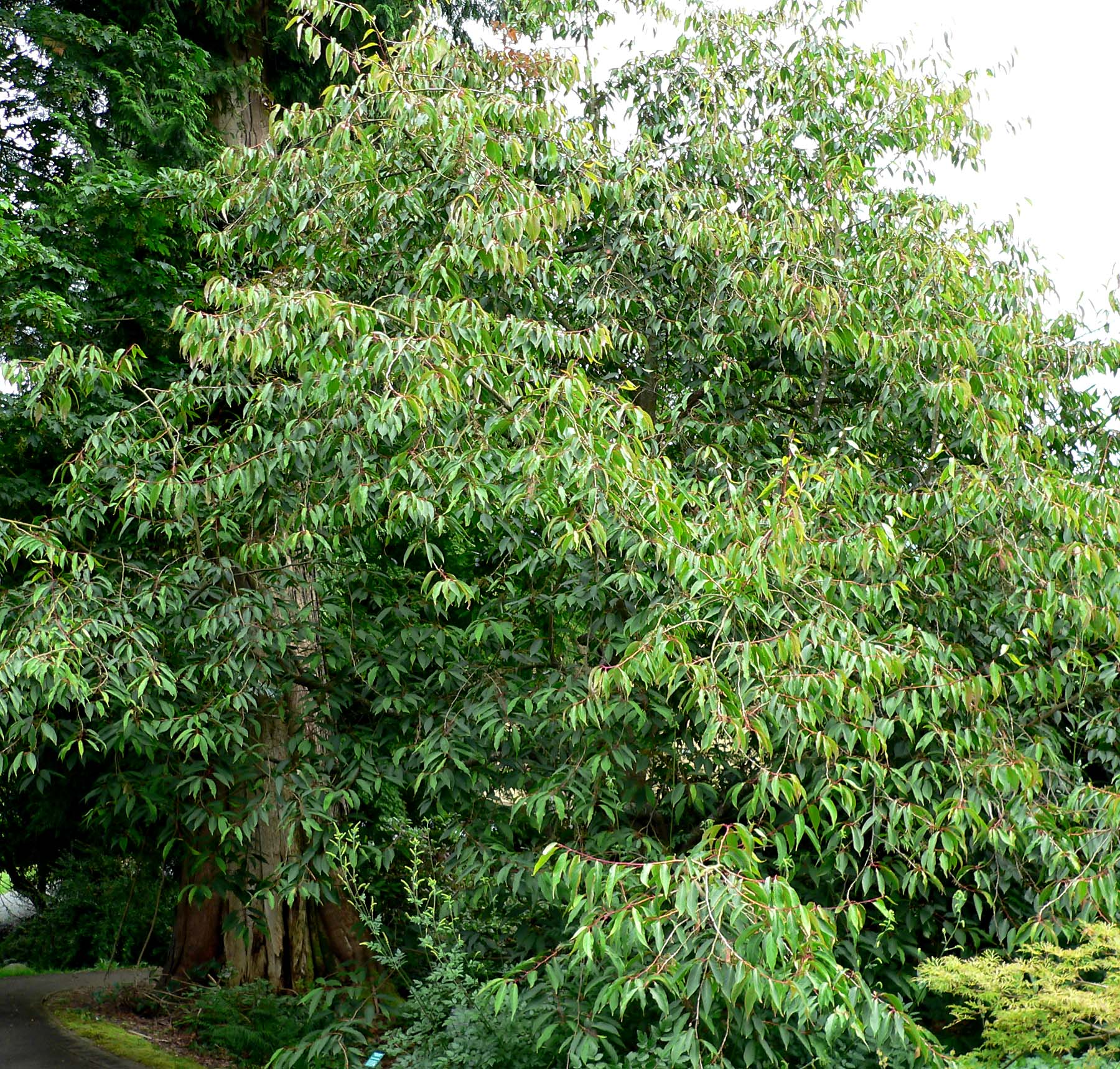
Rehderodendron macrocarpum

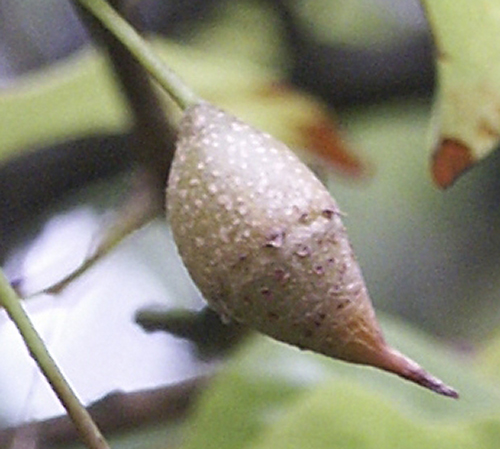
Sinojackia rehderiana

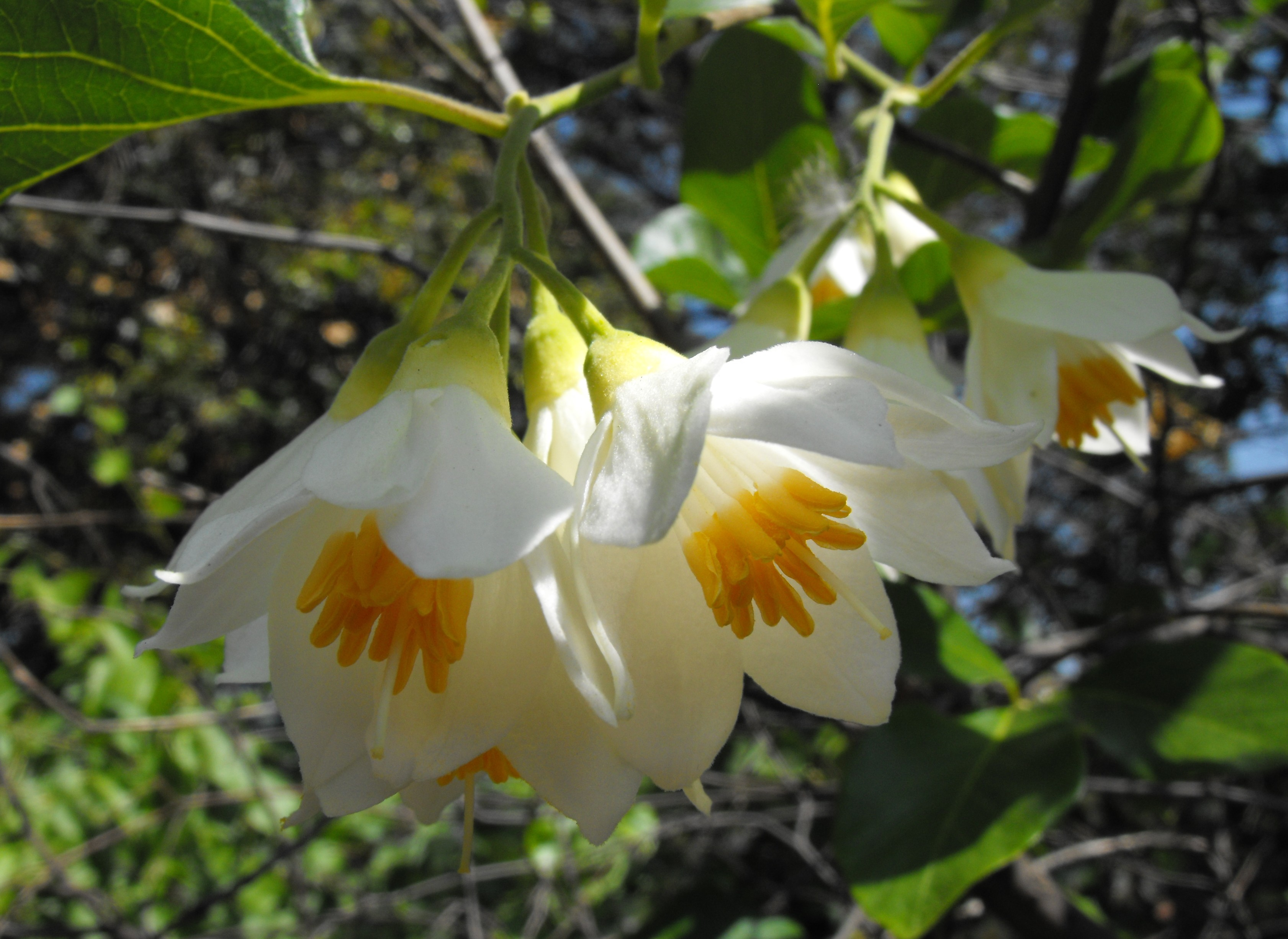
Styrax officinalis
