= Papier d'Armenie =

Perfume coated paper

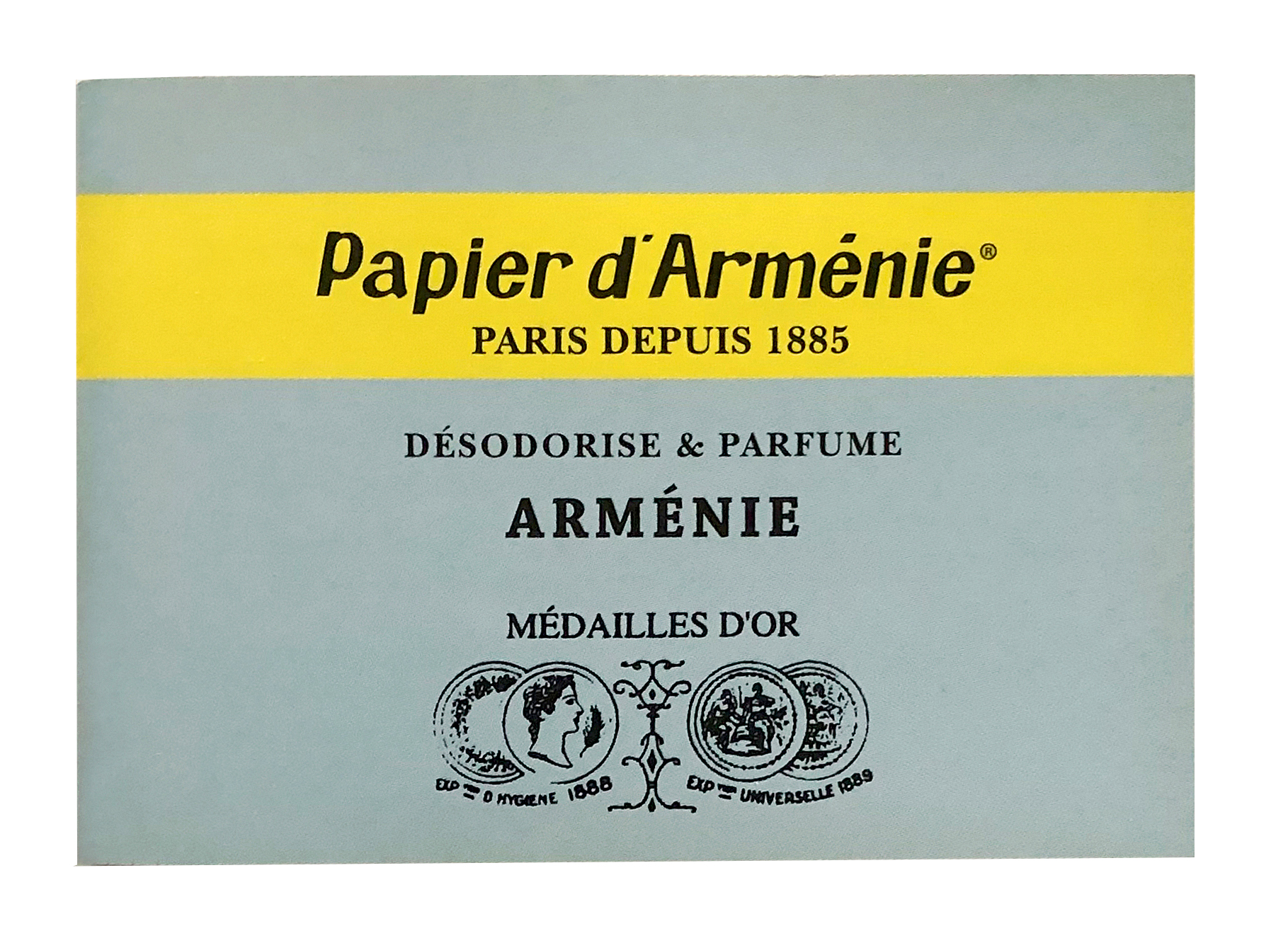
Booklet of genuine Papier d'Arménie, a registered trademark.

Papier d'Arménie (Armenian paper) is a type of paper incense or room deodorizer that has been produced in France since 1885. The paper is soaked in a solution of benzoin resin that has been dissolved in alcohol; with varieties, such as Rose, which have additional fragrances or essential oils. It was developed in the late 19th century by a French chemist, Auguste Ponsot, who, after visiting Armenia where he saw the locals burning benzoin resin to refresh and cleanse their homes, created the incense paper with pharmacist Henri Rivier. The recipe and method of production is a trade secret.

Papier d'Arménie brand is a registered trademark throughout the world and does not constitute a generic name for burning paper. There are variations though, such as Carta d'Armenia which is sold by Santa Maria Novella in Italy, and Carta Aromatica Eritrea.

== History ==
At the end of the 19th century, Auguste Ponsot discovered that Armenian households would burn plants in the genus Styrax as a fragrance. Ponsot adopted this habit, and, with the help of the pharmacist Henri Rivier, created his own recipe wherein benzoin (resin) was dissolved in alcohol then let to soak into blotting paper. The product has been steadily produced in Montrouge, France since 1885. In 2006, during the Year of Armenia in France (Année de l'Arménie en France), the celebrated French perfumer of Armenian origin Francis Kurkdjian gave his own recreation of the historical recipe.

The company Papier d'Arménie, based in Montrouge in the suburbs of Paris, has been managed by the co-founder's great grand-daughter, Mireille Schvartz, since 1991. By 2023, the company was producing 3.5 million booklets a year and exporting 15% of its production.

== Use ==
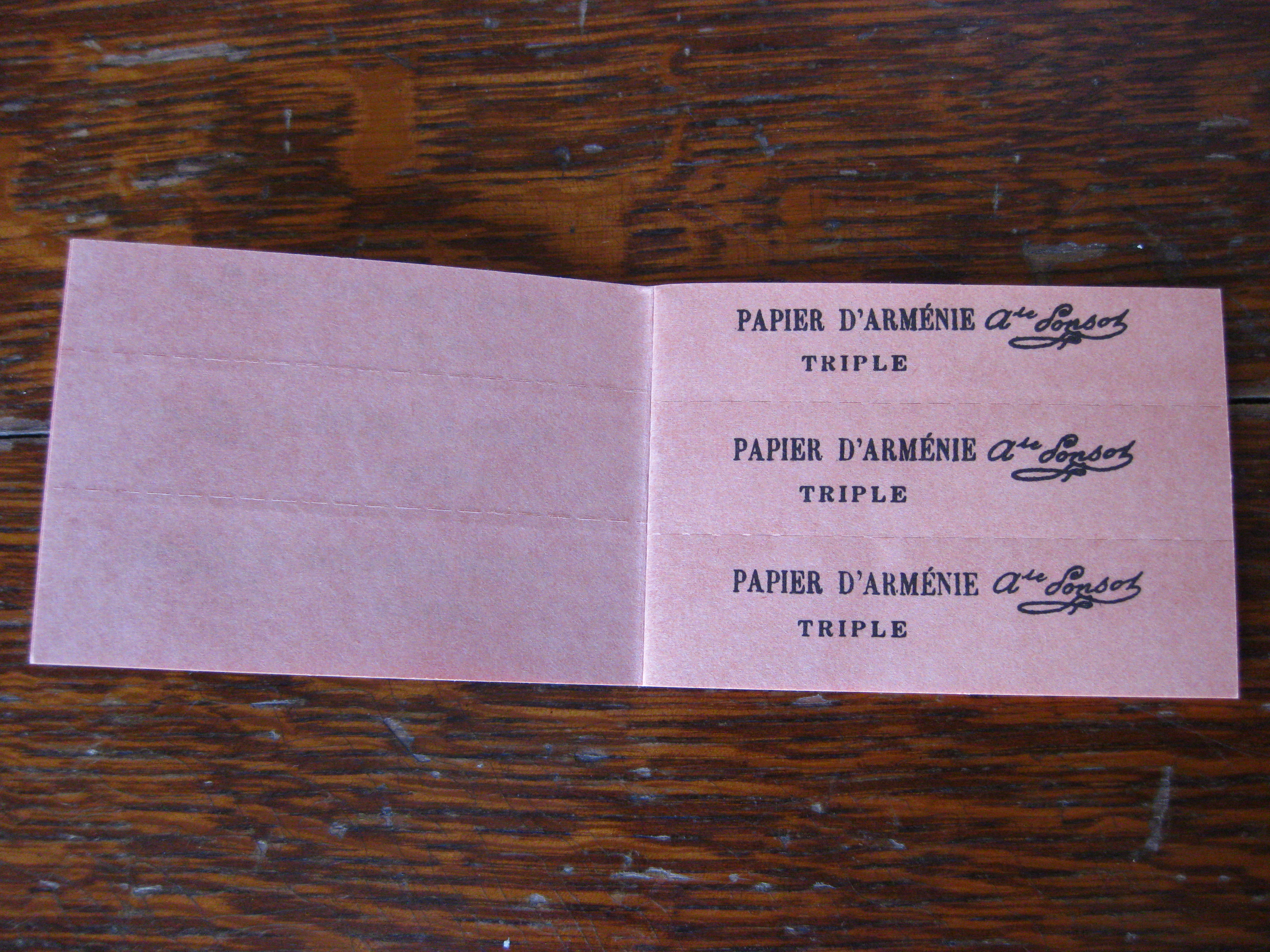
Sheets can be torn out for individual use

Typically, a strip of Papier d'Arménie is torn from the booklet, folded accordion-style, and placed on a heat-resistant support. The strip is lit and blown on until the paper begins to glow and release the vanilla scent characteristic of resin compounds. The smell is pleasant and subtle. Traditionally, the product was sold as a disinfectant, though it has no such properties. This belief began with a demonstration in 1889 of burning Papier d'Arménie in a closed cylinder above a piece of raw meat, which spoiled less than a comparable untreated piece of meat after a week. Today Papier d'Arménie is sold primarily as a form of incense or perfume, as a form of candle, or as a form of air freshener.

It is typical to burn 3 or 4 strips per week, and to air the area regularly.

== Safety ==
Multiple studies show that burning incense in closed areas poses a significant health risk.
