= Benzoin resin =

Balsamic resin from trees in genus Styrax

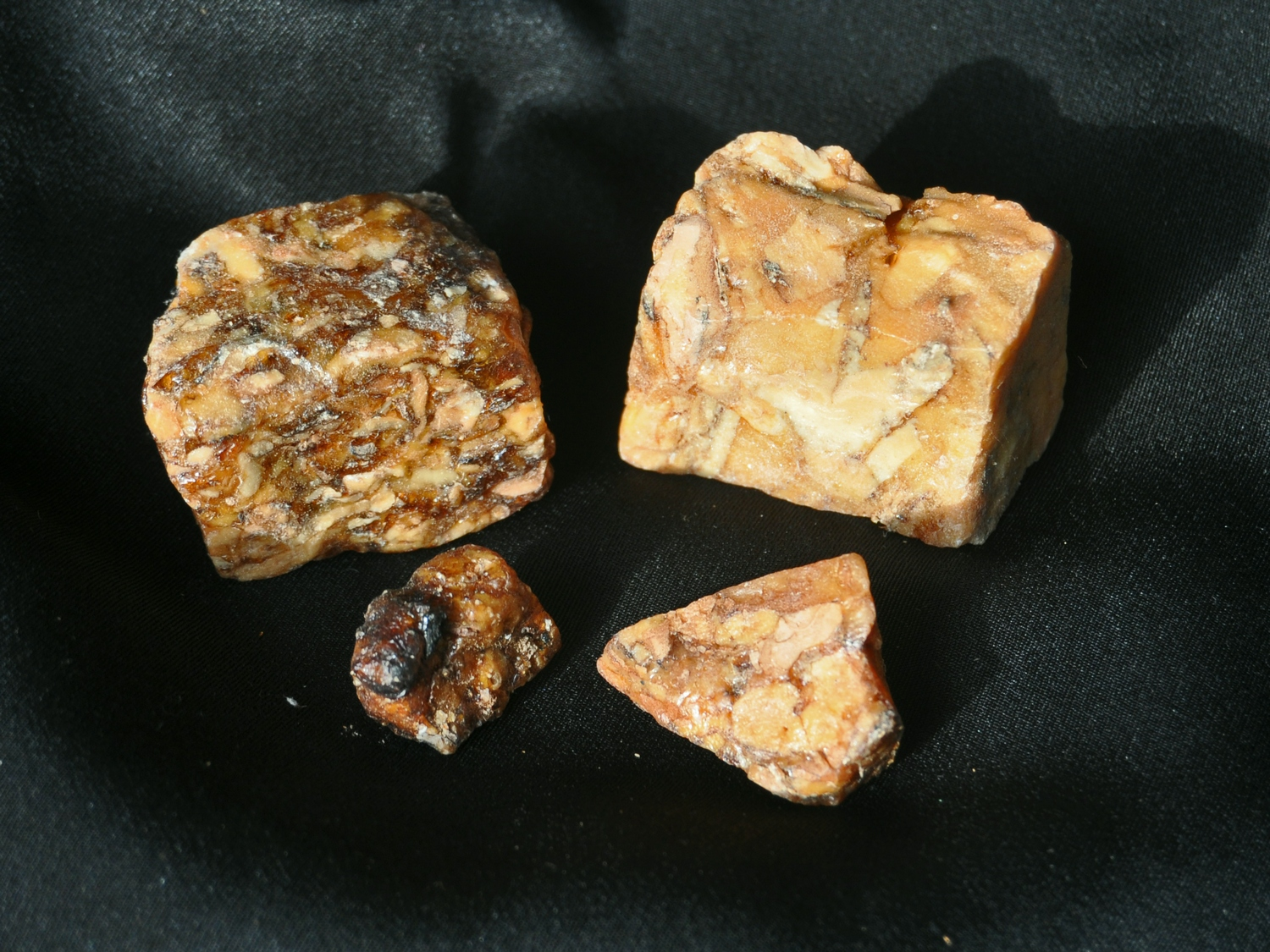
Benzoin, known as kemenyan, from Gombong, Central Java

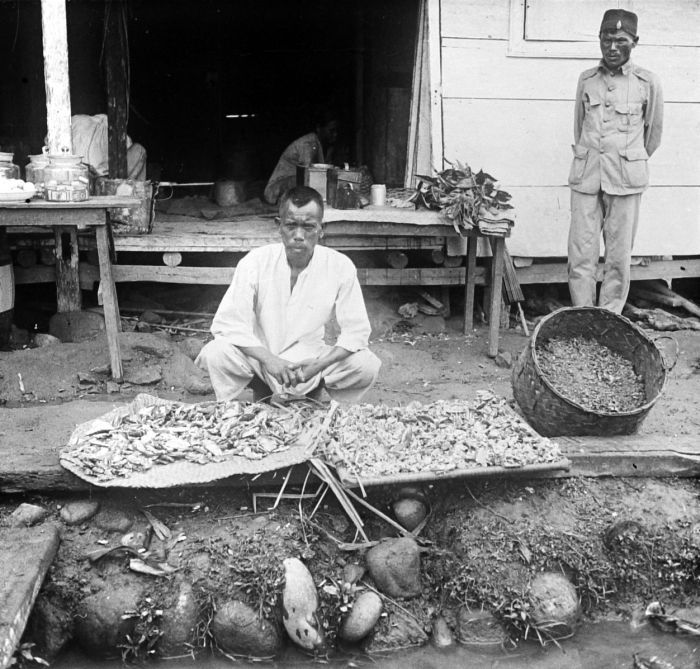
Benzoin street vendor in Tapanoeli Residency, North Sumatra

Benzoin resin /ˈbɛnzoʊ.ɪn/ or benzoin, or benjamin (corrupted pronunciation) is a balsamic resin obtained from the bark of several species of trees in the genus Styrax. It is used in perfumes and some kinds of incense and as a flavoring and medicine (see tincture of benzoin). It is distinct from the chemical compound benzoin, which is ultimately derived chemically from benzoin resin; the primary active ingredient of benzoin resin is actually benzoic acid, not benzoin.

Benzoin is sometimes called gum benzoin or gum benjamin, and in India Sambrani or loban, though loban is, via Arabic lubān, a generic term for frankincense-type incense, e.g., fragrant tree resin. The syllable "benz" ultimately derives from the Arabic lubān jāwī (لبان جاوي, "frankincense from Java"). (mid 16th century: from French benjoin, based on Arabic lubānjāwī ‘incense of Java’.)

Benzoin is also called storax, not to be confused with the balsam of the same name obtained from the Altingiaceae family.

Benzoin resin is a common ingredient in incense-making and perfumery because of its sweet vanilla-like aroma and fixative properties. Gum benzoin is a major component of the type of church incense used in Russia and some other Eastern Orthodox Christian societies, as well as Latin Catholic churches. Benzoin is used in the Arabian Peninsula and Hindu temples of India, where it is burned on charcoal as an incense. It is also used in the production of Bakhoor (Arabic بخور - scented wood chips) as well as various mixed resin incense in the Arab countries and the Horn of Africa. Benzoin is also used in blended types of Japanese incense, Indian incense, Chinese incense (known as Anxi xiang; 安息香), and Papier d'Arménie as well as incense sticks.

There are two common kinds of benzoin, benzoin Siam and benzoin Sumatra. Benzoin Siam is obtained from Styrax tonkinensis, found across Thailand, Laos, Cambodia, and Vietnam. The aroma of benzoin Siam is described as sweet, vanilla, balsamic, woody, and powdery. Benzoin Sumatra is obtained from Styrax paralleloneurus (syn. Styrax sumatranus) and Styrax benzoin, which grows predominantly on the island of Sumatra. Unlike Siamese benzoin, Sumatran benzoin contains cinnamic acid in addition to benzoic acid. The aroma of benzoin Sumatra is described as sweet, spicy, vanilla, and balsamic. In the United States, Sumatra benzoin is used in pharmaceuticals and Siam benzoin is used as a flavouring agent and fragrance.

In perfumery, benzoin is used as a fixative, slowing the dispersion of essential oils and other fragrance materials into the air. Benzoin is used in cosmetics, veterinary medicine, and scented candles. It is used as a flavoring in alcoholic and nonalcoholic beverages, baked goods, chewing gum, frozen dairy, gelatins, puddings, and soft candy.

In anesthesia and surgery, it is used as an adhesive to secure wound and catheter dressing and is available as a sterile preparation.

== See also ==
- Friar's balsam – Pungent solution of benzoin resin in ethanol
