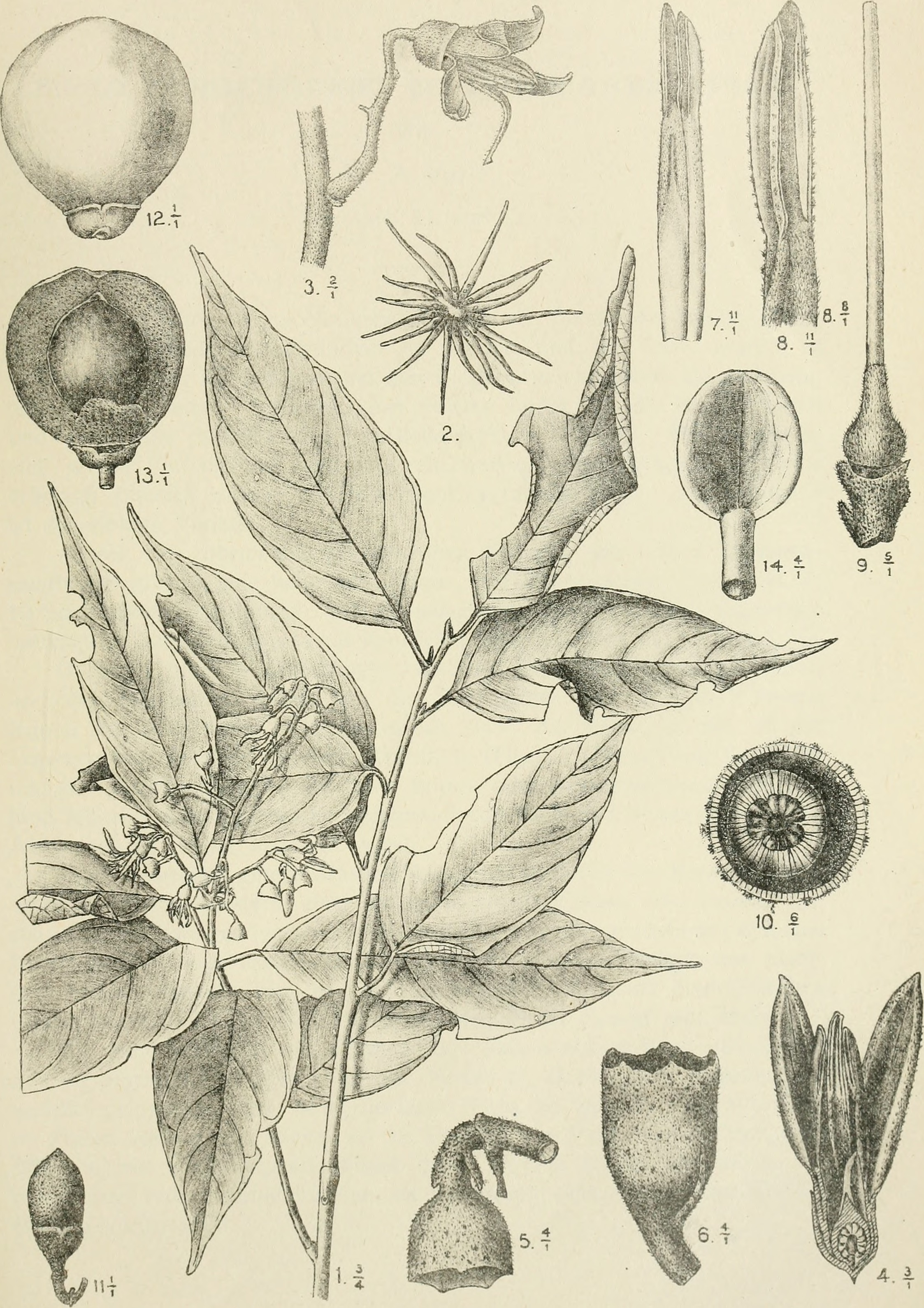

Scientific classification
- Kingdom: Plantae
- Clade: Tracheophytes
- Clade: Angiosperms
- Clade: Eudicots
- Clade: Asterids
- Order: Ericales
- Family: Styracaceae
- Genus: Styrax
- Species: S. paralleloneurus

Binomial name
- Styrax paralleloneurus Perkins

Synonyms
- Styrax paralleloneurus f. inutilis Steenis; Styrax siamensis Rordorf; Styrax sumatranus J.J.Sm.

= Styrax paralleloneurus =

Species of plant

Styrax paralleloneurus (syn. Styrax sumatranus) is a species of Styrax native to Sumatra and Peninsular Malaysia. It is the main source of benzoin in Sumatra. Its balsamic resin is superior to that of Styrax benzoin, another source of benzoin Sumatra, as the latter dries slowly and remains sticky, hence more inpurities. It can have the largest galls of any known plant; up to 20 cm long, and about half as wide.
