= H. diptera =

H. diptera may refer to:

- Halesia diptera, a silverbell, a shrub native to southeast North America
- Hoya diptera (Seemann, 1896), a waxplant species in the genus Hoya native to the Fiji Islands
- Diptera Americae Septentrionalis indigena, a book written by American author Loew, H. (Hermann), 1807-1879

== See also ==
- Diptera
