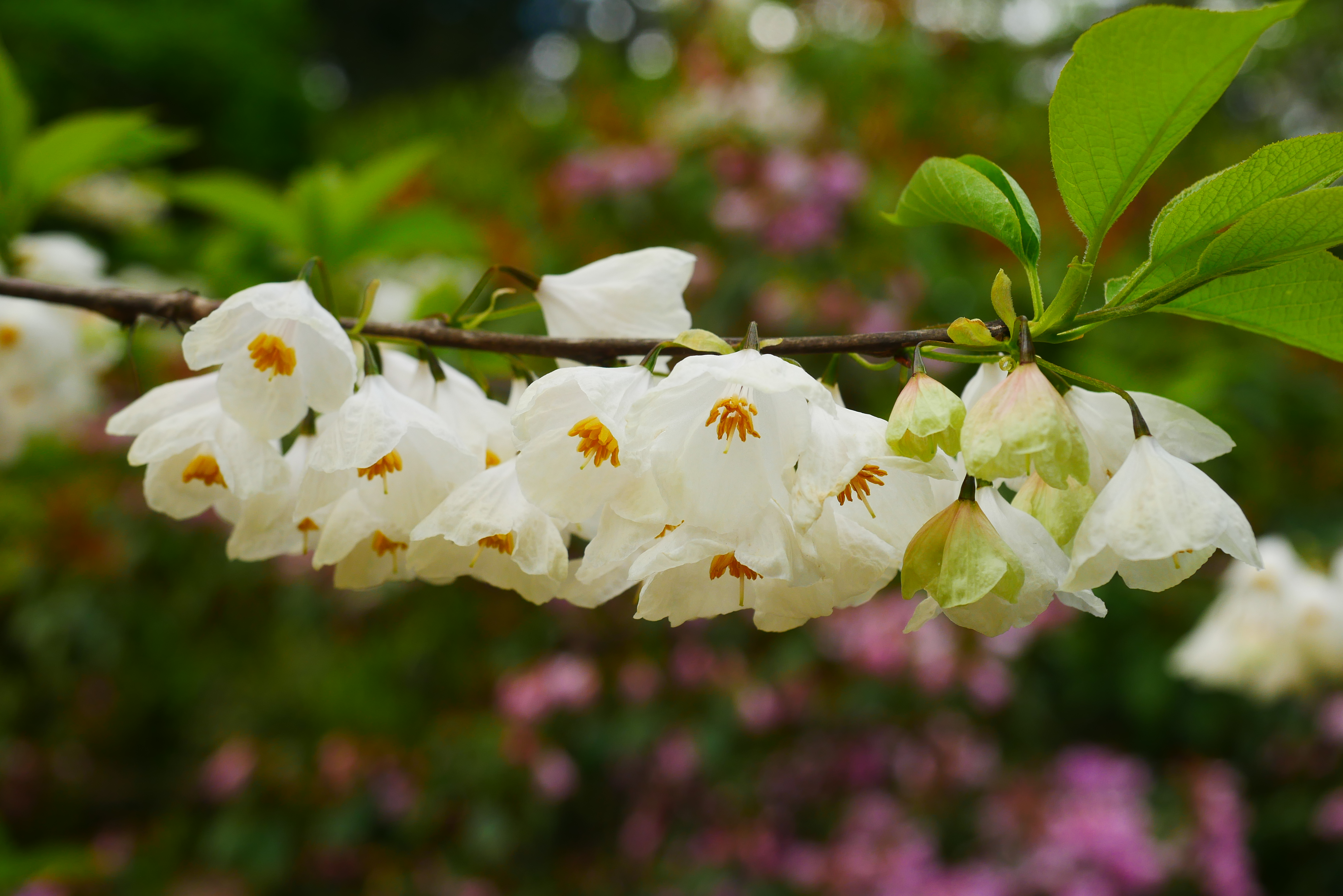

Conservation status
- Least Concern (IUCN 3.1)

- Apparently Secure (NatureServe)

Scientific classification
- Kingdom: Plantae
- Clade: Tracheophytes
- Clade: Angiosperms
- Clade: Eudicots
- Clade: Asterids
- Order: Ericales
- Family: Styracaceae
- Genus: Halesia
- Species: H. carolina

Binomial name
- Halesia carolina L.

Synonyms
- Carlomohria carolina (L.) Greene; Carlomohria parviflora (Michx.) Greene; Halesia parviflora Michx.

= Halesia carolina =

Species of flowering plant

Halesia carolina, commonly called Carolina silverbells or little silverbells, is a species of flowering plant in the family Styracaceae, native to the southeastern United States.

== Description ==
It is a vigorous, fast-growing deciduous shrub or tree growing to 8 m (26 ft) tall by 10 m (33 ft) broad, bearing masses of pendent, bell-shaped white flowers which appear in spring before the leaves. The flowers are followed by green, four-winged fruit. The leaves turn yellow in autumn.

== Range ==
The natural range of little silverbells is very restricted. It is principally in the panhandle of Florida, with isolated smaller outlier populations in South Carolina, Georgia, Alabama, Mississippi. (In the cited reference, this species is referred to as Halesia parviflora.) However, it can grow much farther north, up to USDA hardiness zone 4; the "champion" Halesia carolina on the 2015 American Forests' National Register of Champion Trees is quite removed from its natural range, being situated in Roxbury, New Hampshire.

== Taxonomy ==
There is a great deal of confusion in the four-winged American silverbells. Four principal species names have been used: H. carolina, H. parviflora, H. monticola, and H. tetraptera. The taxon being described here is the one that has also been described as H. parviflora. Some botanists have discarded the name H. carolina because the original material is viewed as ambiguous; others maintain that the original material is this species, so carolina is here being used instead of parviflora, since H. carolina L. has clear precedence.

== Cultivation ==
In cultivation in the United Kingdom, H. carolina Vestita Group has gained the Royal Horticultural Society's Award of Garden Merit. It requires an acid or neutral soil, in a partially shaded position.

The fruits may be collected in late fall and early winter to collect the seeds.

This tree is recommended for food forests (also called edible forests) as its immature fruits can be eaten in May/June and have a cucumber taste.

== Gallery ==
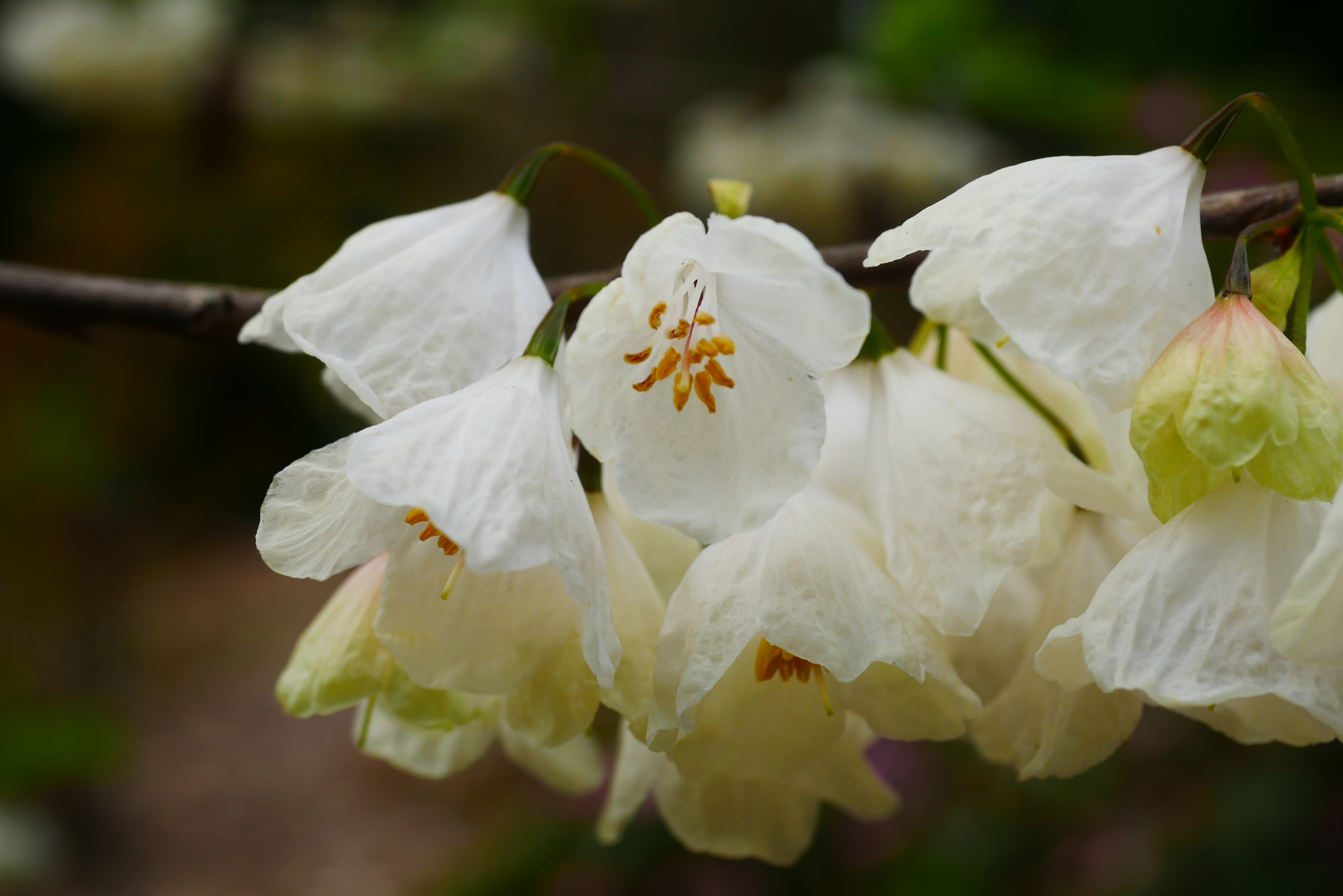

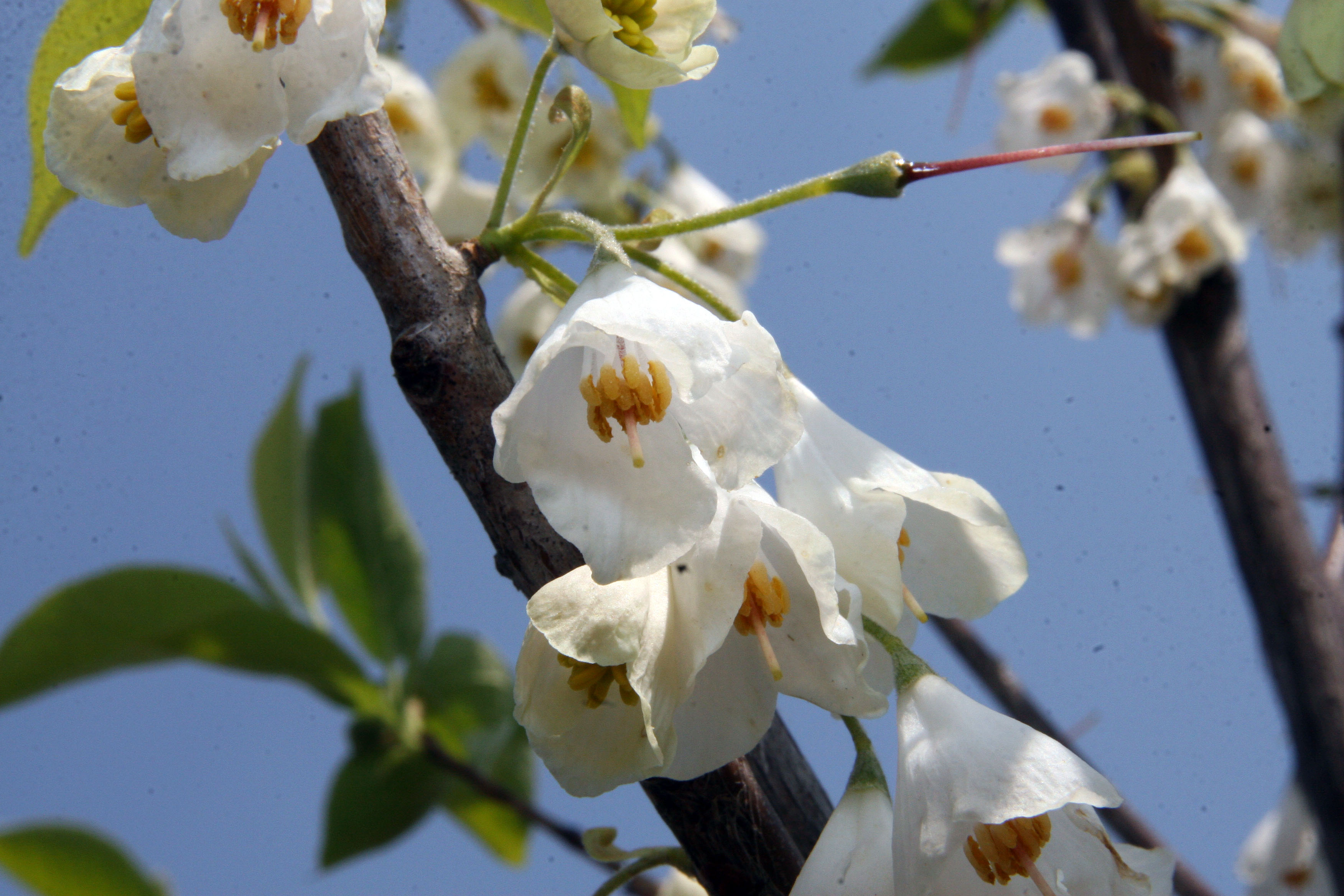

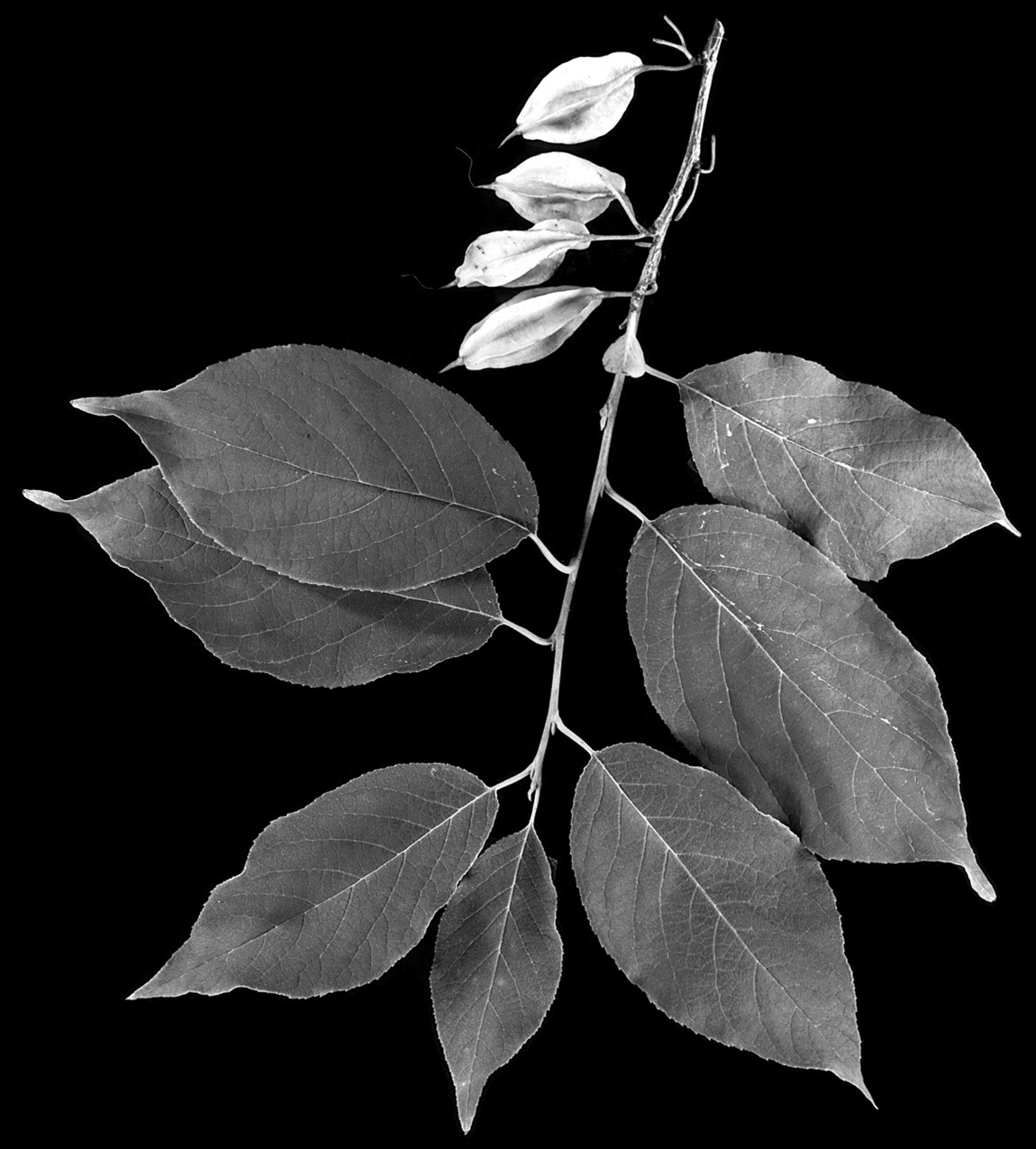
Leaves and fruit

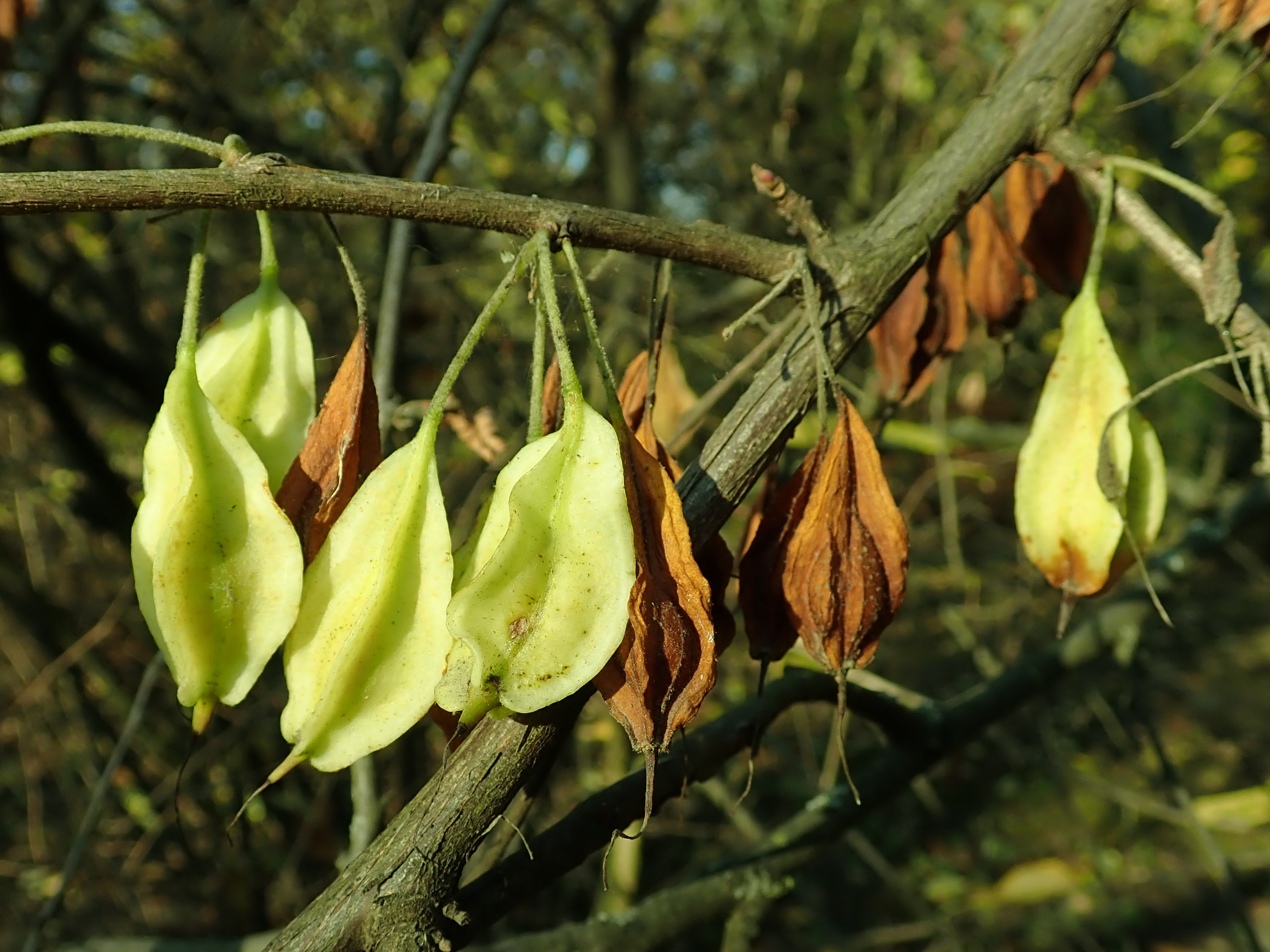
Fruit

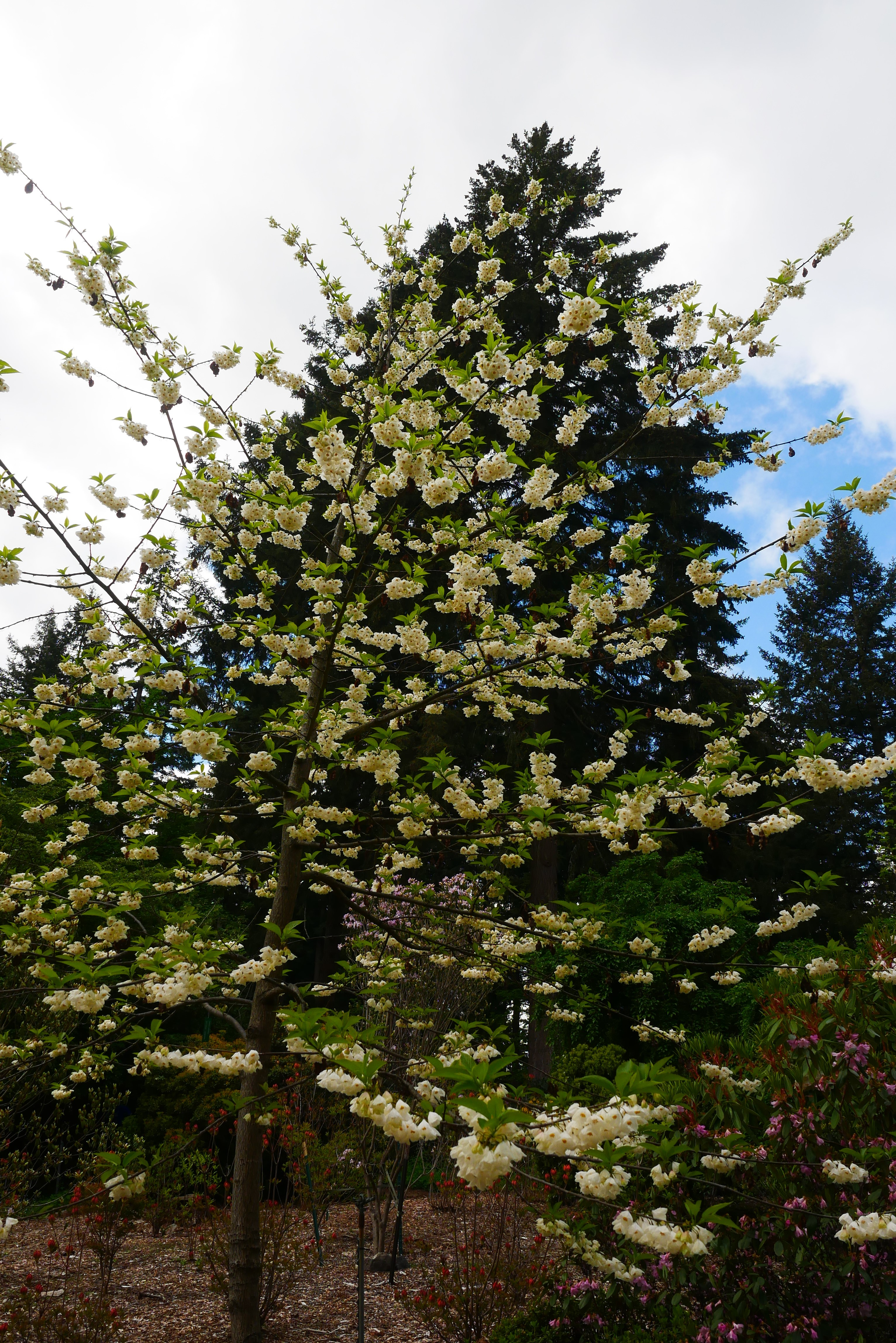
Full plant in bloom
