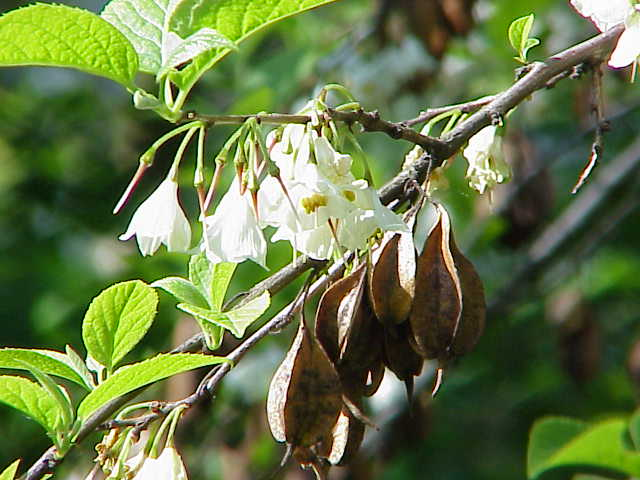
- Halesia carolina

Scientific classification
- Kingdom: Plantae
- Clade: Tracheophytes
- Clade: Angiosperms
- Clade: Eudicots
- Clade: Asterids
- Order: Ericales
- Family: Styracaceae
- Genus: Halesia; J.Ellis ex L.

Species
- See text

= Halesia =

Genus of trees

Halesia, also known as silverbell or snowdrop tree, is a small genus of four or five species of deciduous large shrubs or small trees in the family Styracaceae.

== Range ==
They are native to eastern Asia (southeast China) and eastern North America (southern Ontario, Canada south through Florida and eastern Texas, United States).

== Description ==
They grow to 5–20 m (16–66 ft) tall (rarely to 39 m (128 ft)), and have alternate, simple ovate leaves 5–16 cm long and 3–8 cm broad. The flowers are pendulous, white or pale pink, produced in open clusters of 2–6 flowers, each flower being 1–3 cm long. The fruit is a distinctive, oblong dry drupe 2–4 cm long. All species except H. diptera have four narrow longitudinal ribs or wings on fruit; diptera only has two, making it the most distinctive of the group.

=== Species ===
- Halesia carolina L.; little silverbell – eastern North America (syn. H. parviflora Michx. or H. tetraptera var. parviflora (Michx.) Schelle)
- Halesia diptera Ellis; two-wing silverbell – southeastern North America
- Halesia macgregorii Chun; Chinese silverbell or Macgregor's silverbell – eastern China
- Halesia tetraptera L.; common silverbell – eastern North America;
  which includes a variety treated by some as a full species:
- Halesia monticola (Rehd.) Sarg.; mountain silverbell – southern Appalachians and southwards (syn. H. carolina var. monticola Rehder; H. carolina subsp. monticola (Rehder) A.E.Murray; H. tetraptera var. monticola (Rehder) Reveal & Seldin)^{cf.}

Halesia monticola is the largest of the genus, with specimens up to 39 m (128 ft) tall known in the Great Smoky Mountains National Park in North Carolina; the second-largest is H. macgregorii, reaching 24 m (79 ft) in China. The others rarely exceed 10 m (33 ft) tall. H. monticola is considered by some to be a subspecies of H. carolina (a.k.a. H. tetraptera). However, there appears to be a consistent size difference between the two taxa.

== Taxonomy ==
The taxonomy and naming of the American species is confused and extensively disputed. The first dispute is over the exact identity of the specimen first named by Linnaeus as H. carolina; some contend that it is the same as H. parviflora, while others say it is the same as H. tetraptera. The second dispute is over whether H. monticola is sufficiently distinct from the other species to merit specific recognition or not (with its varietal placing depending on the above question, too). Neither question has yet been conclusively answered. The treatment here includes both H. carolina (small) and H. monticola (large).

A phylogenetic study suggests that Halesia is not monophyletic and as a result, the Chinese species Halesia macgregorii has been transferred into a new genus Perkinsiodendron, named after American botanist and Styracaceae expert Janet Russell Perkins.

The genus was named after Stephen Hales by John Ellis, publishing the name in the tenth edition of Linnaeus's Systema Naturae in 1759. The name is conserved as the same name had been used in an obscure earlier publication in 1756 for a different plant.

== Fossil record ==
One fossil endocarp of †Halesia crassa has been described from a middle Miocene stratum of the Fasterholt area near Silkeborg in Central Jutland, Denmark.

== Cultivation and uses ==
Silverbells are popular ornamental plants in large gardens, grown for their delicate pendant flowers in late spring.
