= Halesia macgregorii =

Conservation status
- Vulnerable (IUCN 2.3)

Scientific classification
- Kingdom: Plantae
- Clade: Tracheophytes
- Clade: Angiosperms
- Clade: Eudicots
- Clade: Asterids
- Order: Ericales
- Family: Styracaceae
- Genus: Halesia
- Species: H. macgregorii

Binomial name
- Halesia macgregorii Chun

Species of flowering plant

Halesia macgregorii is a species of flowering plant in the family Styracaceae. It is endemic to southeastern China, where it grows at moderate altitudes of 700–1,200 m. It is threatened by habitat loss. Recent genetic evidence suggests it is probably more closely related to the genus Rehderodendron than to other species of Halesia; it may be transferred to that genus in the future.

It is a deciduous tree growing to 24 m tall, with a trunk up to 45 cm diameter. The leaves are 5–13 cm long and 3–4.5 cm broad, with a petiole 5–10 cm long. The flowers are pendulous, 1.5 cm long, with four white petals. The fruit is a dry drupe 2.5–4 cm long and 2–3 cm diameter.
