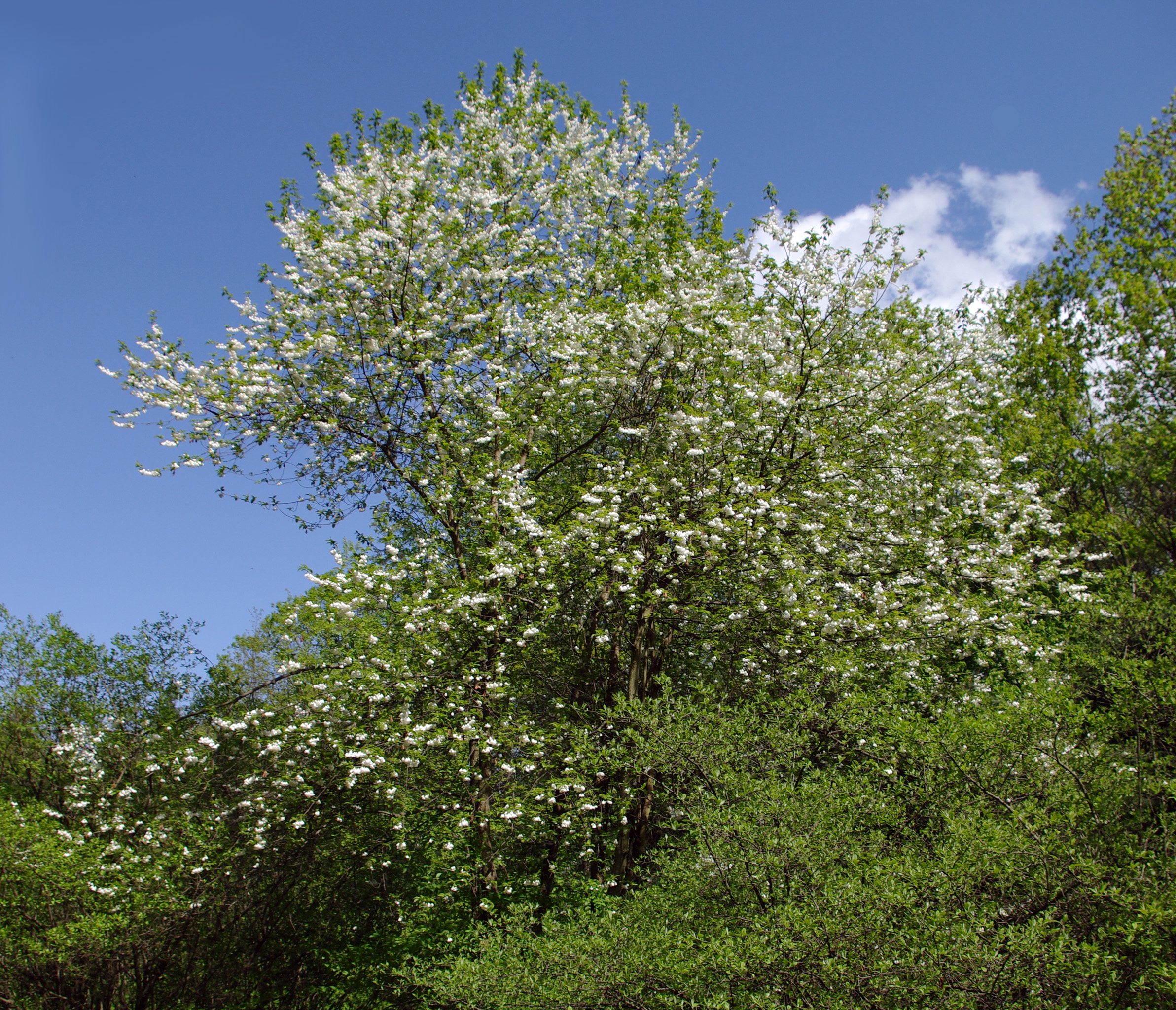

Conservation status
- Secure (NatureServe)

Scientific classification
- Kingdom: Plantae
- Clade: Tracheophytes
- Clade: Angiosperms
- Clade: Eudicots
- Clade: Asterids
- Order: Ericales
- Family: Styracaceae
- Genus: Halesia
- Species: H. monticola

Binomial name
- Halesia monticola (Rehder) Sargent

Synonyms
- H. carolina var. monticola Rehder; H. carolina subsp. monticola (Rehder) A.E.Murray; H. tetraptera var. monticola (Rehder) Reveal & Seldin ^{cf.}

= Halesia monticola =

Species of tree

Halesia (tetraptera var.) monticola, the mountain silverbell, is a species of flowering plant in the small family Styracaceae. This large deciduous shrub was originally included in H. carolina, but was identified first as a subspecies by Rehder in 1914 and then as a species by Sargent in 1921. More recently, some authoritative sources regard it only as a subspecies or variety, while other authoritative sources regard it as a species, as it is treated here.

== Description ==
Halesia monticola is much larger than either the little silverbell or common silverbell (var. tetraptera) and is the largest member of the genus. It is known to grow 34 m (112 ft) tall in the Great Smoky Mountains. Another important difference is that monticola has significantly larger flowers than either H. carolina or H. tetraptera.

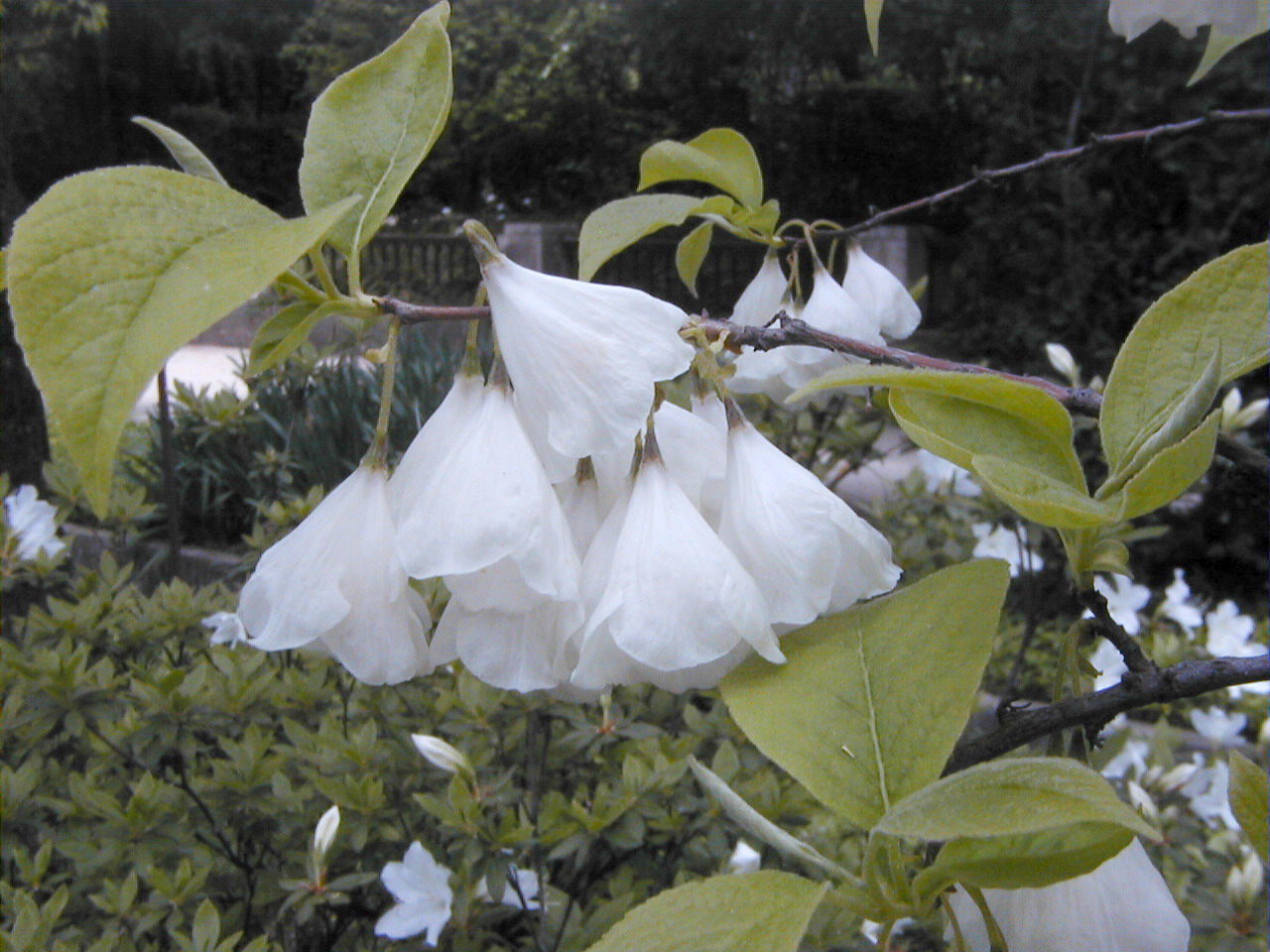
Flowers

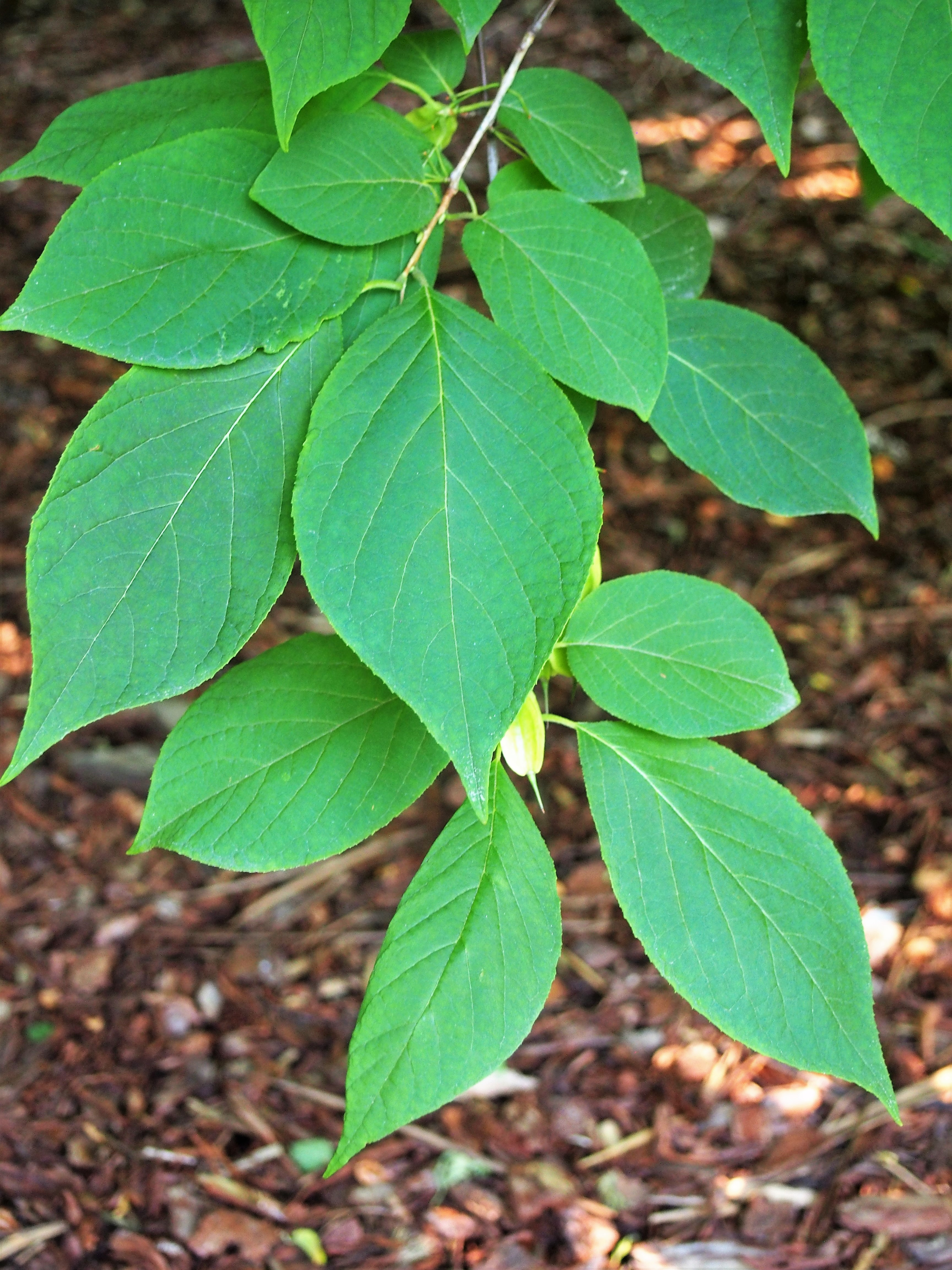
Leaves

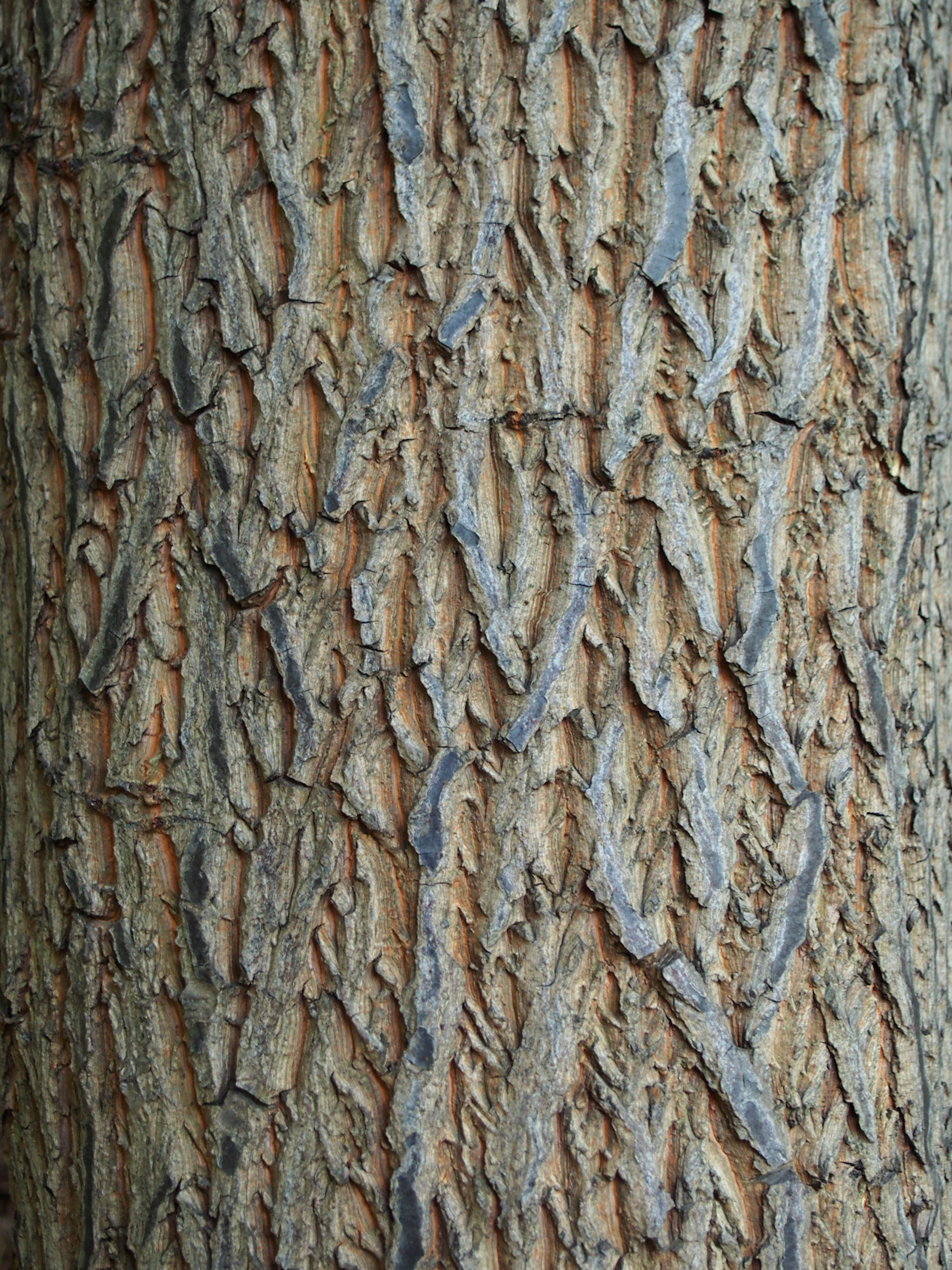
Bark

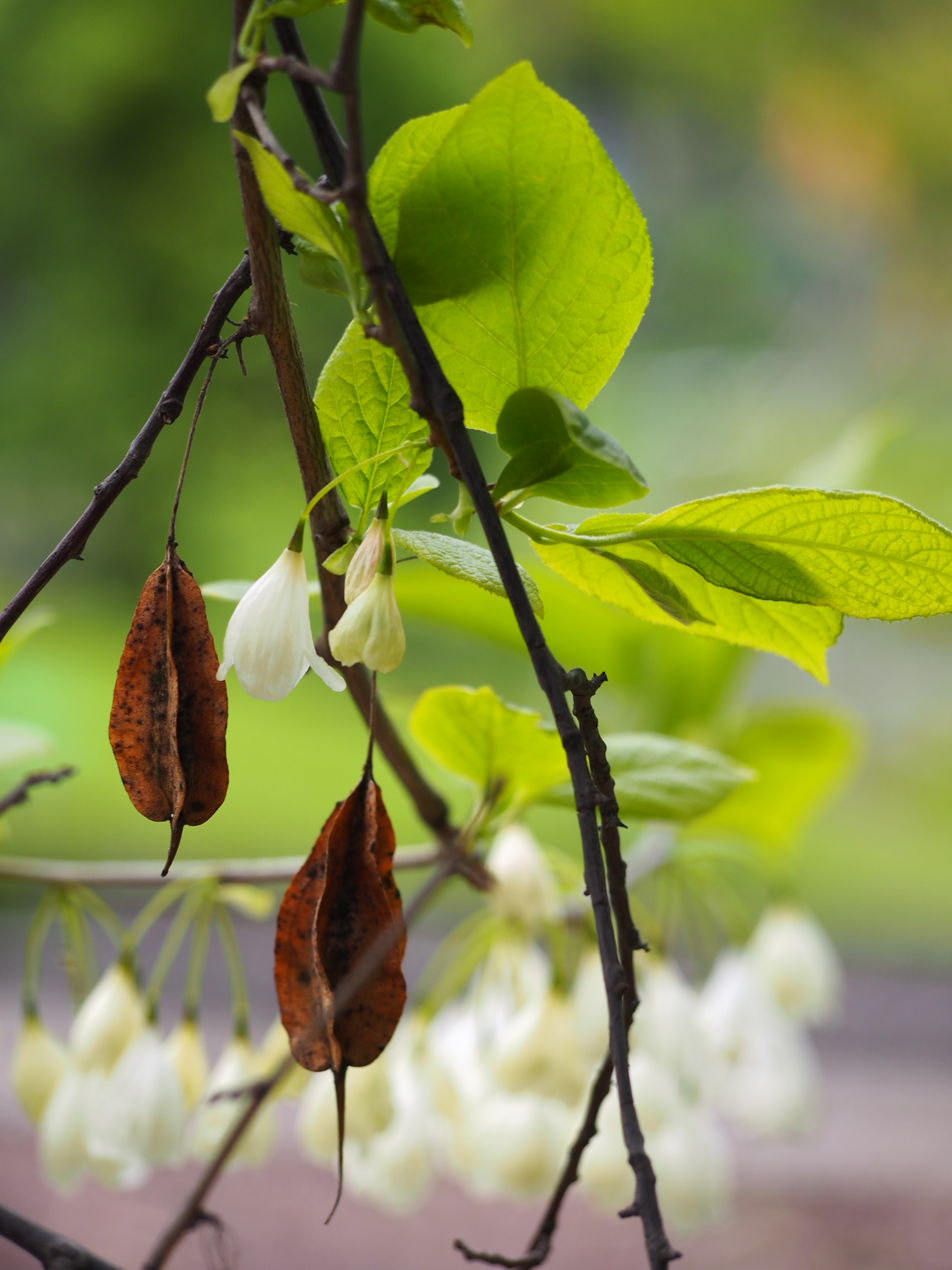
Dry fruit

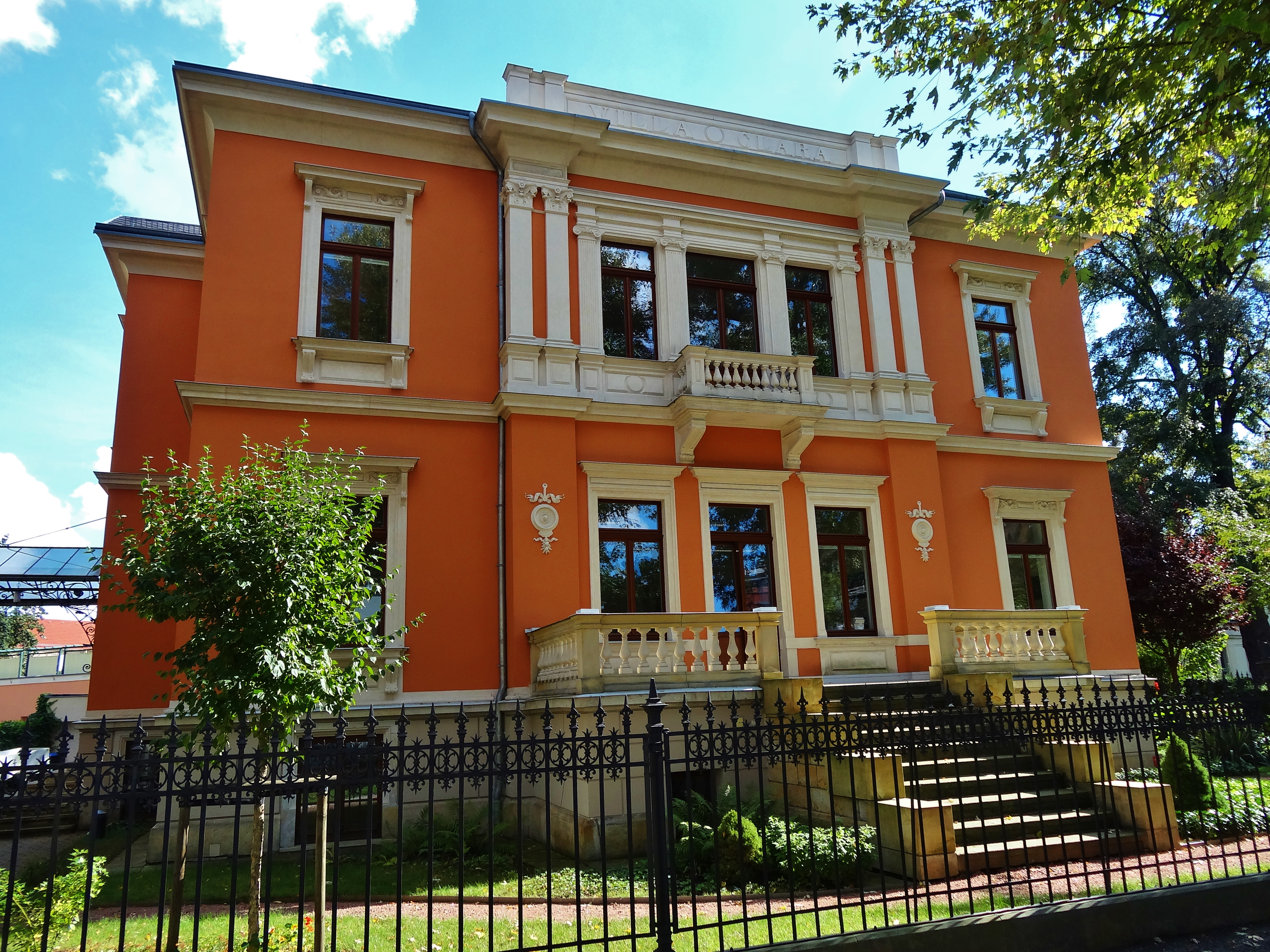
Overall shape of sapling (at left)

== Range ==
The silverbell tree grows mostly in the southern Appalachian Mountains and into southern Alabama and Georgia, with small outlying populations up to and barely north of the Ohio River, and along the Oklahoma-Arkansas border. It is apparently absent from Mississippi and Louisiana. In the cited reference, this species is referred to as Halesia carolina.

== Cultivation ==
The mountain silverbell is cultivated in many places around the world. Although it may be difficult to transplant, once established, it is easy to grow. It blooms while still quite small, only about 4 m (13 ft) tall.
