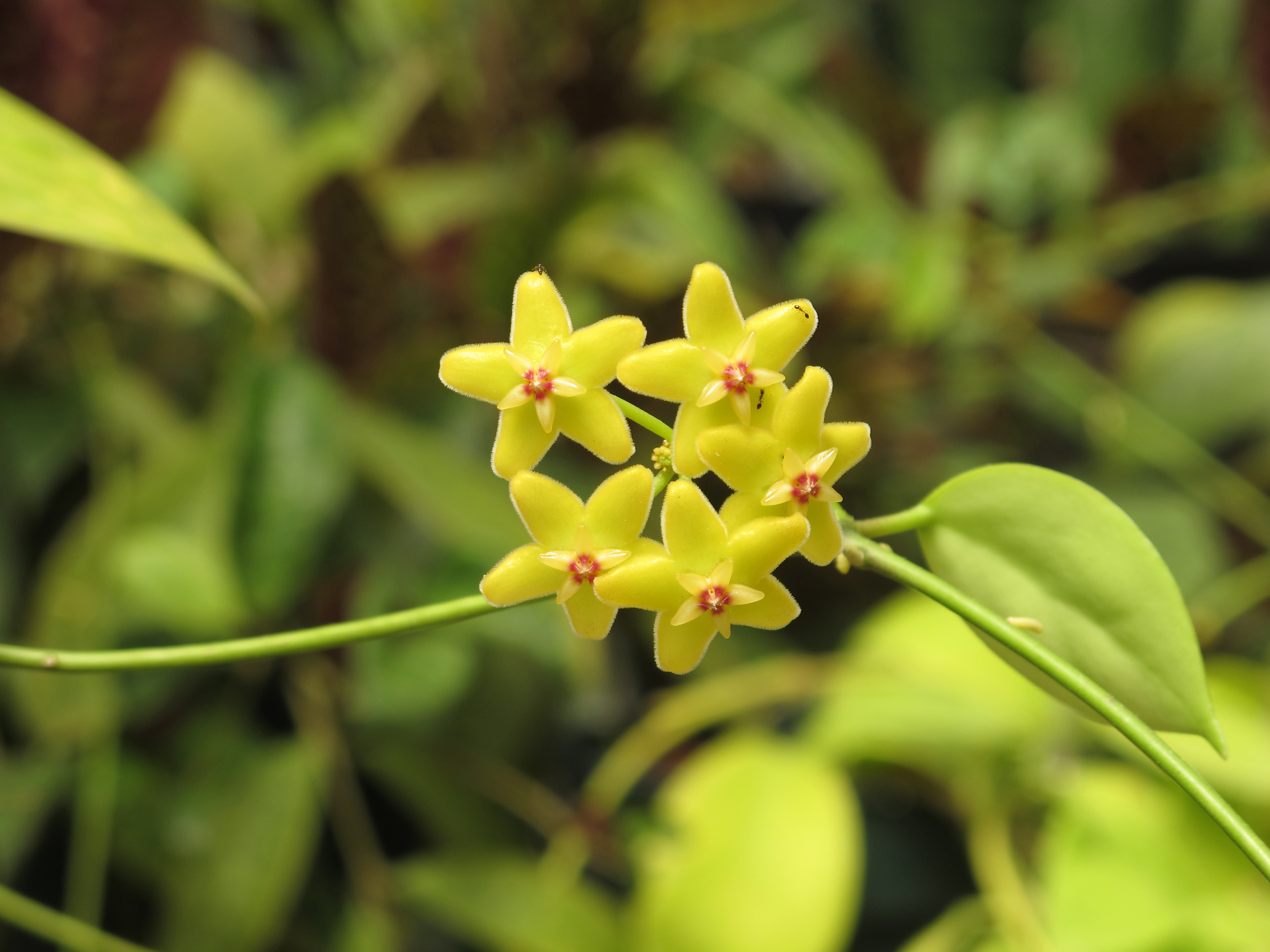

Scientific classification
- Kingdom: Plantae
- Clade: Tracheophytes
- Clade: Angiosperms
- Clade: Eudicots
- Clade: Asterids
- Order: Gentianales
- Family: Apocynaceae
- Genus: Hoya
- Species: H. diptera

Binomial name
- Hoya diptera Seem.

= Hoya diptera =

Species of plant

Hoya diptera is a species of Hoya native to Vanuatu and Fiji.

== See also ==
- List of Hoya species
