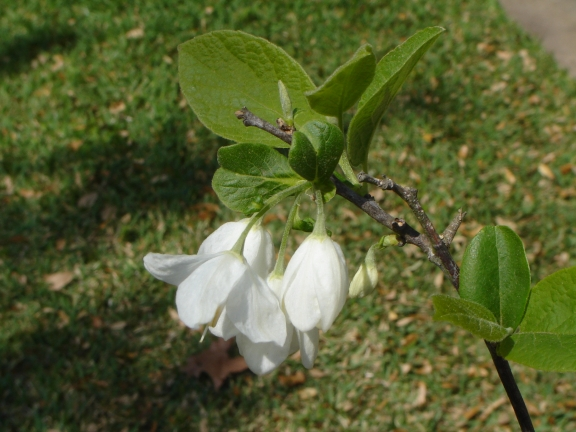

Conservation status
- Least Concern (IUCN 3.1)

- Secure (NatureServe)

Scientific classification
- Kingdom: Plantae
- Clade: Tracheophytes
- Clade: Angiosperms
- Clade: Eudicots
- Clade: Asterids
- Order: Ericales
- Family: Styracaceae
- Genus: Halesia
- Species: H. diptera

Binomial name
- Halesia diptera J.Ellis

= Halesia diptera =

Two-wing silverbell

Species of tree

Halesia diptera, the two-wing silverbell or two-winged snowdrop tree, is a species in the family Styracaceae, native to the southeastern United States from South Carolina and Florida west to eastern Texas. It is cultivated as an ornamental tree.

== Description ==
It is a large shrub or small tree reaching 4–8 m tall. The leaves are deciduous, 6–12 cm long and 4–7 cm broad. The flowers are white, 2-2.5 cm long, produced in clusters of 3–6 together. The fruit is a dry (non-fleshy) drupe with two wings down the sides; this distinguishes it from the other species of Halesia, which have four wings on the fruit.

Wildlife, including squirrels, eat the unripe sour green fruit.

== Varieties ==
There are two varieties:

- Halesia diptera var. diptera
- Halesia diptera var. magniflora R.K.Godfrey

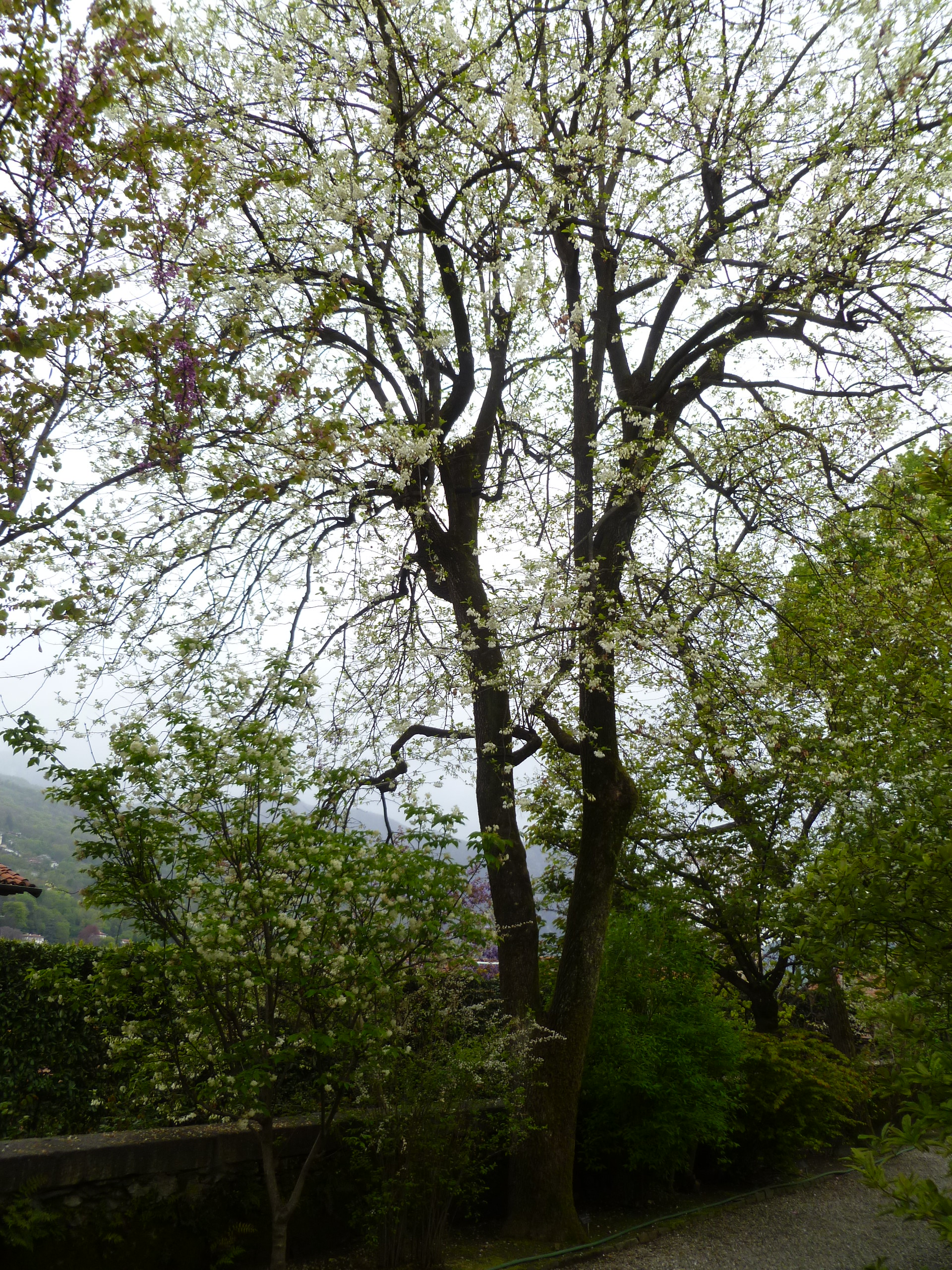
Mature tree in flower
