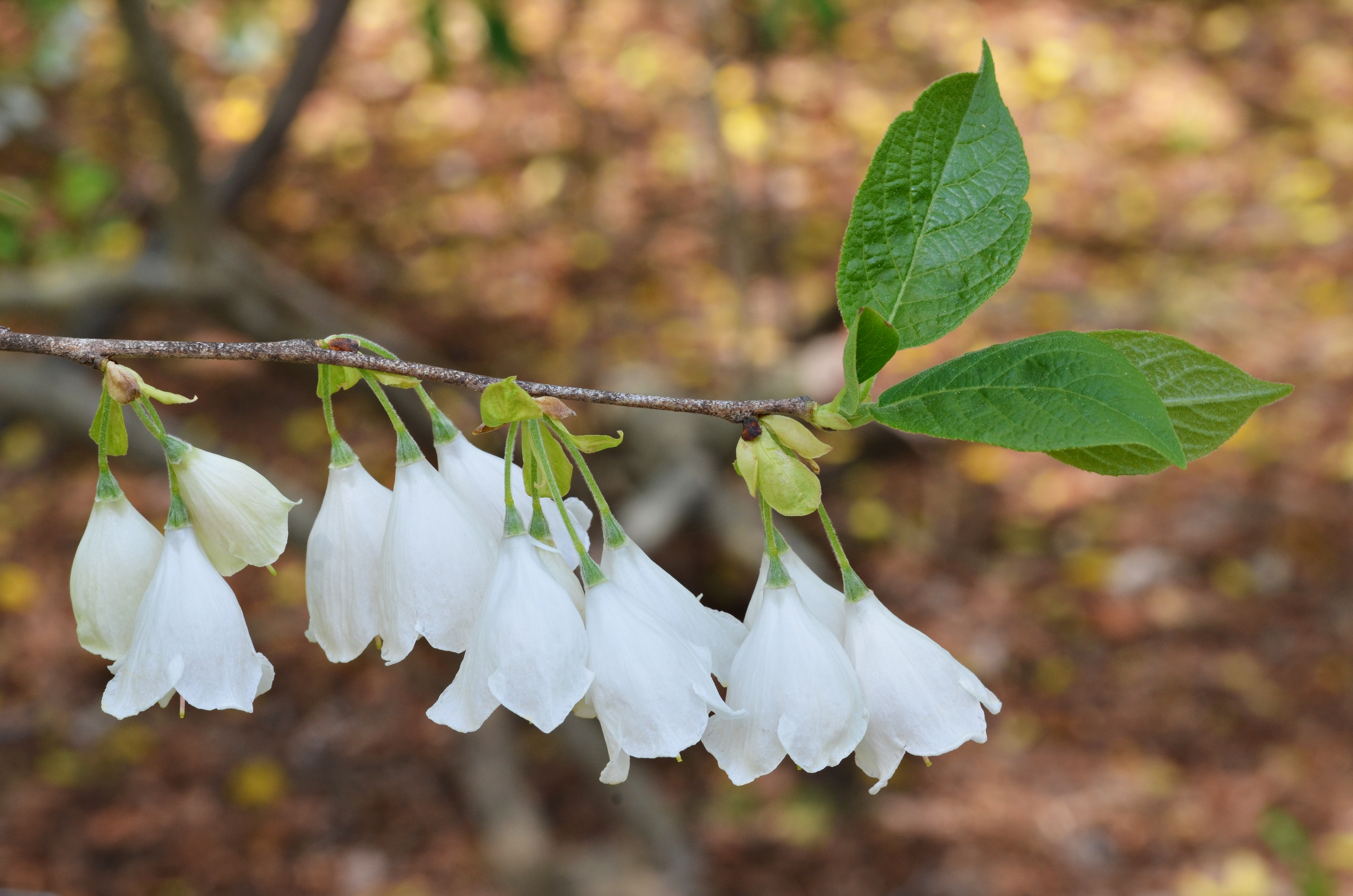

Conservation status
- Secure (NatureServe)

Scientific classification
- Kingdom: Plantae
- Clade: Tracheophytes
- Clade: Angiosperms
- Clade: Eudicots
- Clade: Asterids
- Order: Ericales
- Family: Styracaceae
- Genus: Halesia
- Species: H. tetraptera

Binomial name
- Halesia tetraptera L.

= Halesia tetraptera =

Common silverbell

Species of tree

Halesia tetraptera, commonly known as the common silverbell or mountain silverbell (or Carolina silverbell; syn. Halesia carolina auct. non L.), is a species in the family Styracaceae, native to the southeastern United States. It is cultivated as an ornamental tree.

== Description ==
It is a small deciduous tree growing to 10 m (33 ft) tall. The leaves are ovate to lanceolate, 5–16 cm (2.0–6.3 in) long and 4–7 cm (1.6–2.8 in) broad. The flowers are 1–2.5 cm (0.39–0.98 in) long, with a four-lobed white corolla. The fruit is a dry drupe 4 cm (1.6 in) long, with four wings running along its length.

== Range ==
The species is found in scattered populations over much of the eastern United States, as far north as West Virginia, south to northern Florida, and west to Oklahoma. But it is thinly distributed over much of its native range, and is becoming rare in many areas.

== Varieties ==
There are two varieties of H. tetraptera:

- Halesia tetraptera var. tetraptera – Common silverbell
- Halesia tetraptera var. monticola (Rehder) Reveal & Seldin – Mountain silverbell

The last taxon is much larger, up to 20–39 m (66–128 ft) tall, with larger leaves up to 20 cm (7.9 in) long and flowers up to 3 cm (1.2 in) long.

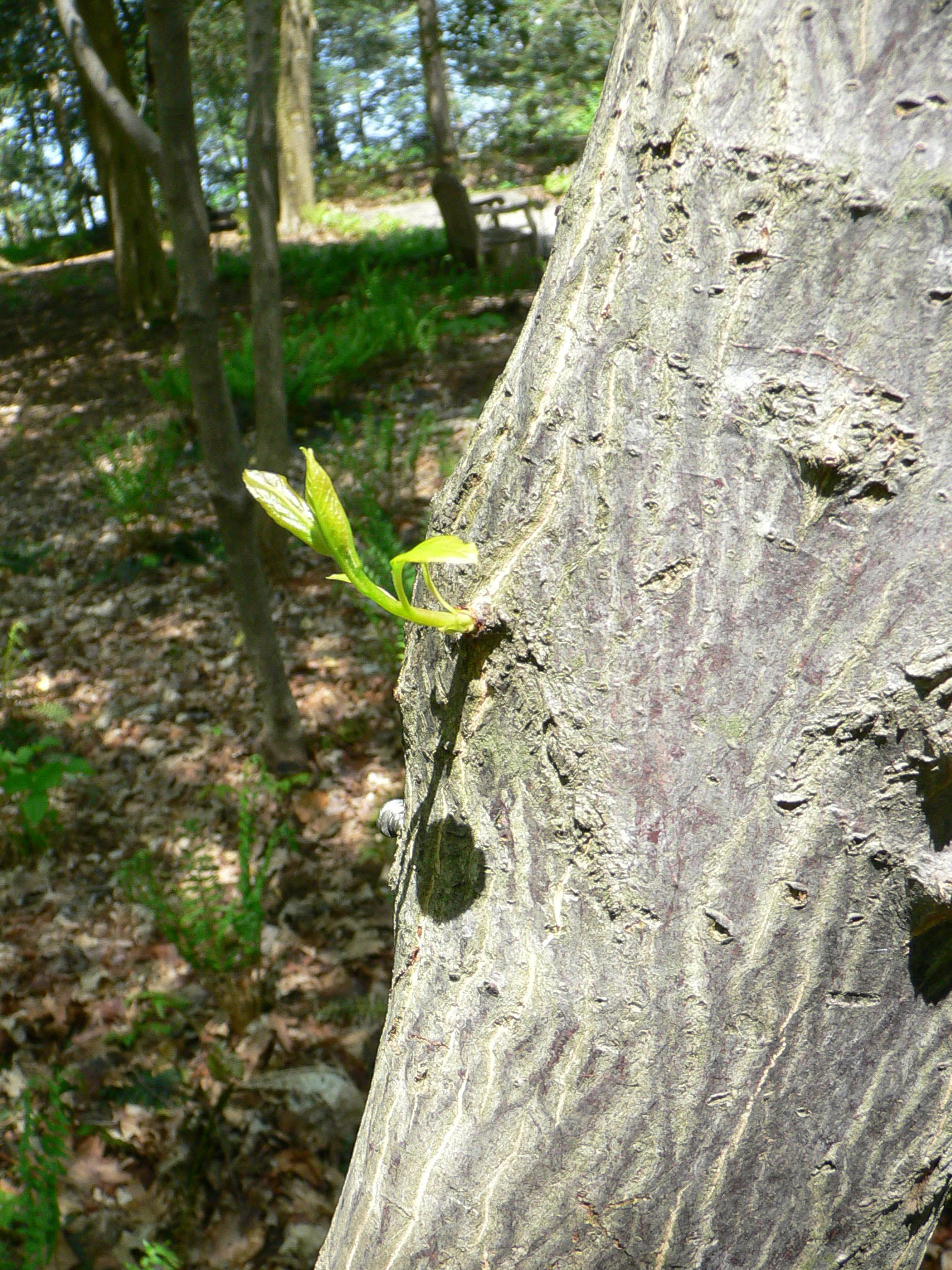
Trunk

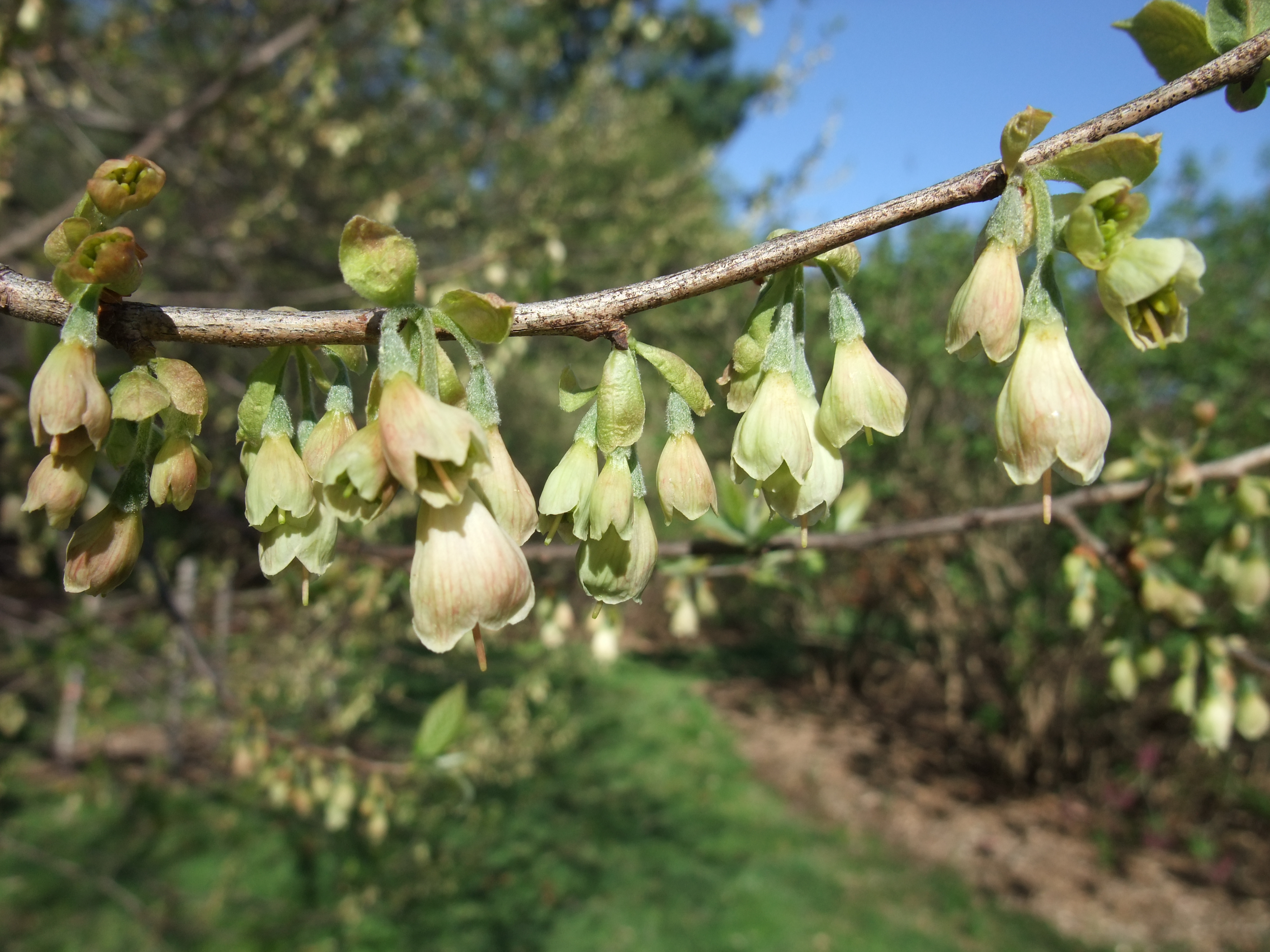
Flowers

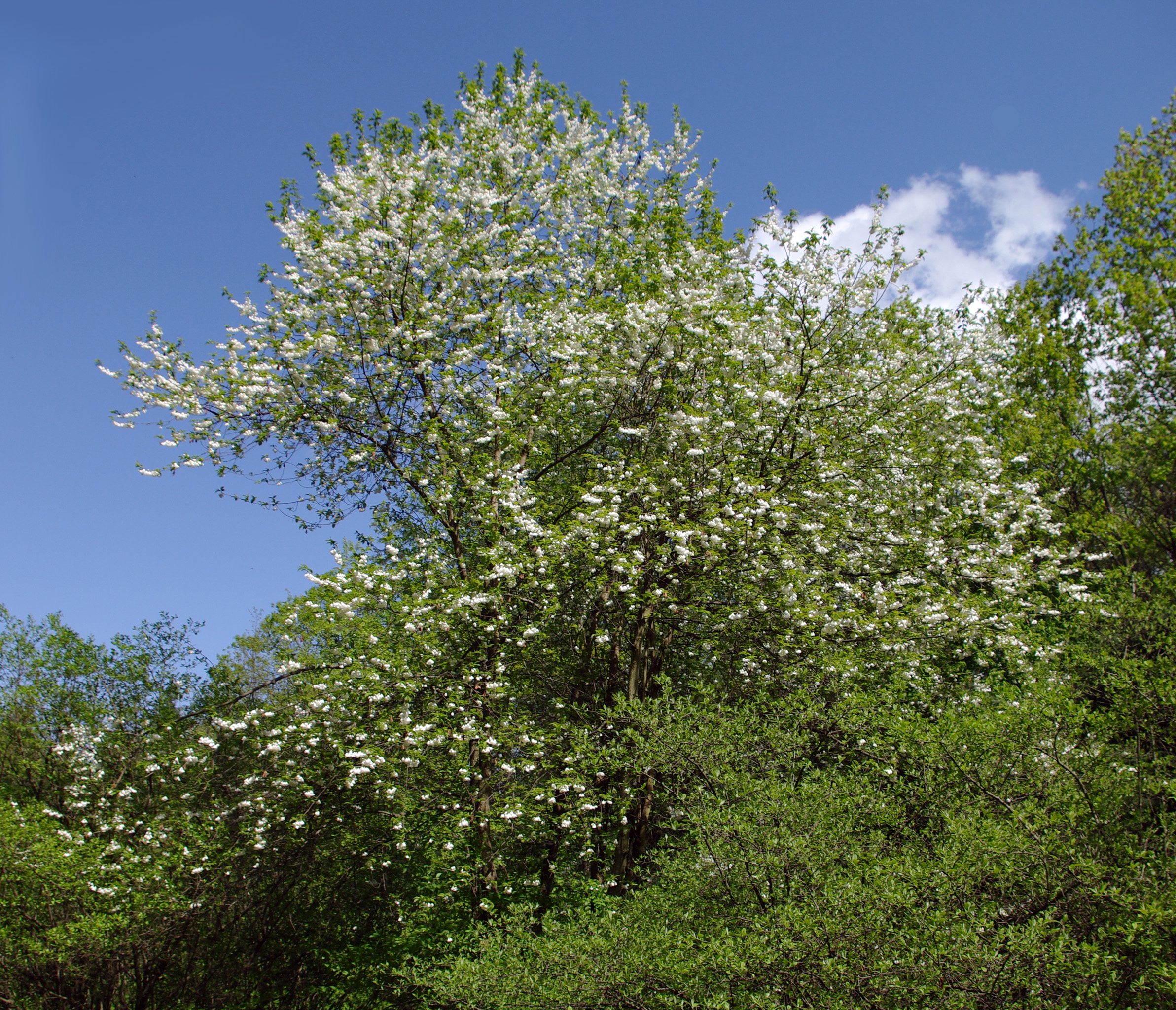
H. tetraptera var. monticola

== Ecology ==
H. tetraptera var. tetraptera has been marked as a pollinator plant, supporting and attracting butterflies and bees.
