= Salisbury University Arboretum =

Arboretum in Salisbury, Maryland

Coordinates: 38°20′39″N 75°36′26″W

The Pergola at Salisbury University

The Salisbury University Arboretum, also known as The Glenda Chatham Clarke Arboretum, (50 ha / 125 acres) is an arboretum on the campus of Salisbury University in Salisbury, Maryland.

The collection was begun in 1985. In 1988, the entire university campus was declared an arboretum by the American Association of Botanical Gardens and Arboreta and now contains over 2000 plant species. The arboretum is still under active development with indigenous and exotic plant species added yearly. It is located on the Delmarva Peninsula, an area known as Maryland's Eastern Shore. Midway between the Atlantic Ocean and the Chesapeake Bay, at a latitude of approximately 38 degrees, the climate is suitable for mild-temperate zone plants.

In May 2025, the arboretum was named after alumna Glenda Chatham Clarke.

== Plant species ==
Its collection includes:

- Acer griseum
- Acer palmatum
- Acer platanoides
- Acer rubrum
- Acer saccharinum
- Acer saccharum
- Acer triflorum
- Aesculus × carnea
- Aesculus pavia
- Castanea dentata
- Catalpa speciosa
- Cedrus libani
- Cedrus libani var. atlantica
- Cercidiphyllum japonicum
- Cercis canadensis
- Chamaecyparis lawsoniana
- Chionanthus retusus
- Chionanthus virginicus
- Cladrastis lutea
- Clethra barbinervis
- Cornus florida
- Cornus kousa
- Crataegus phaenopyrum
- Cunninghamia lanceolata
- Diospyros virginiana
- Ginkgo biloba
- Gymnocladus dioicus
- Halesia carolina
- Idesia polycarpa
- Ilex opaca
- Koelreuteria paniculata
- Lagerstroemia indica
- Liquidambar styraciflua
- Liriodendron tulipifera
- Magnolia grandiflora
- Magnolia kobus
- Magnolia denudata
- Magnolia × loebneri
- Magnolia macrophylla
- Magnolia salicifolia
- Magnolia × soulangeana
- Magnolia stellata
- Magnolia virginiana
- Malus 'Red Jade'
- Malus × zumi var. calocarpa
- Nyssa sylvatica
- Paulownia tomentosa
- Picea abies
- Picea pungens
- Pinus wallichiana
- Poliothyrsis sinensis
- Prunus mume
- Prunus yedoensis
- Ptelea trifoliata
- Punica granatum
- Pyrus calleryana
- Quercus acutissima
- Quercus phellos
- Quercus rubra
- Sassafras albidum
- Sciadopitys verticillata
- Sorbus rufoferoginnea
- Stuartia pseudocamellia
- Styrax japonicus
- Styrax obassia
- Syringa reticulata
- Taxodium distichum
- Taxodium ascendens
- Tetradium daniellii
- Tilia cordata
- Tsuga canadensis
- Vitex agnus-castus

== Sculpture collection ==
The Arboretum is also notable for its collection of figurative sculpture, notably in the Beaux Arts style. Notable works include:

- Diana (1886) by Augustus Saint-Gaudens
- Coquelin Cadet (1912) by Auguste Rodin (a study for Burghers of Calais)
- Ralph Waldo Emerson (1879) by Daniel Chester French
- Harriet Tubman (2009) by Jim Hill
- Fallen Angel (1995) by Benson Selzer
- The Prodigal Son (1976) by Leonard Baskin
- Panther of India (c.1870) by Antoine-Louis Barye
- Ishmael (1995) by Bart Walter
- Henry David Thoreau (1945) by Jo Davidson
- Brotherly Love (1886) by George Grey Barnard

Many of these sculptures can be found on campus in the Link of Nations, connecting the Commons building to the Guerrieri Student Union.

== See also ==
- List of botanical gardens in the United States
