= List of Award of Garden Merit magnolias =

Below is a list of magnolia species and cultivars which currently (2016) hold the Royal Horticultural Society's Award of Garden Merit. Magnolias are shrubs or trees which put on a showy display of tulip-like flowers, often scented, in early to late spring. Many are slow-growing and may take several years to start flowering. They are suitable for cultivation in parks or gardens in temperate regions. M. stellata is suitable for smaller gardens. All are deciduous except for M. grandiflora, which is evergreen. The AGM citation includes a hardiness rating: all of the plants listed here are rated H6 (hardy down to -20 °C to -15 °C) or H5 (hardy down to -15 °C to -10 °C). This is indicated in the column marked H. Nevertheless, magnolias prefer a sheltered spot, and flower buds may be damaged by late frosts. The maximum size (height and spread) is shown in metres.

== Listing ==
Name	AGM	H	Colour	Scent	Max size h×w	Image
M. 'Athene'	2012	H5	white/pink	yes	8 × 8	
M. 'Caerhays Belle'	2012	H5	pink	no	12+ × 8+	
M. 'Caerhays Surprise'	2012	H5	pink	no	8 × 8	
M. campbellii 'Darjeeling'	2012	H4	deep pink/wine	no	10 × 4	
M. 'Daphne'	2012	H6	pale yellow	no	8 × 8	
M. David Clulow'	2012	H5	white/pale pink	no	8 × 8	
M. 'Daybreak'	2012	H6	pink/red	yes	10 × 3	
M. denudata (yulan)	1993	H6	white	yes	12 × 12	
M. 'Elizabeth'	1993	H6	pale yellow	yes	12 × 8	
M. 'Galaxy'	1993	H6	rose-pink	no	12 × 8	
M. 'George Henry Kern'	2012	H6	pale pink/purple	no	4 × 2.5	
M. 'Gold Star'	2012	H6	creamy yellow	no	8 × 4	
M. grandiflora 'Kay Parris'	2012	H5	creamy white	yes	8 × 4	
M. grandiflora 'Victoria'	2002	H5	white	yes	10 × 8	
M. 'Heaven Scent'	1993	H6	rose pink	yes	12 × 12	
M. liliiflora 'Nigra'	1993	H6	red/purple	no	4 × 2.5	
M. × loebneri 'Donna'	2012	H6	white	yes	8 × 8	
M. × loebneri 'Leonard Messel'	1993	H6	lilac/pale pink	yes	8 × 8	
M. × loebneri 'Mag's Pirouette'	2012	H6	white	yes	4 × 3	
M. × loebneri 'Merrill'	1993	H6	white	no	8 × 8	
M. × loebneri 'Wildcat'	2012	H6	white	no	4 × 3	
M. 'Lois'	2012	H6	primrose yellow	yes	12 × 8	
M. 'Milky Way'	2002	H5	white/pale pink	no	8 × 4	
M. 'Pegasus'	2012	H6	white/purple	no	6 × 6	
M. salicifolia 'Wada's Memory'	1993	H6	white	yes	12 × 8	
M. 'Sayonara'	1993	H5	white/purple	no	8 × 4	
M. sieboldii 'Colossus'	2012	H6	white/red	yes	8 × 8+	
M. × soulangeana 'Brozzonii'	1993	H5	white/purple	no	8 × 8	
M. × soulangeana 'Pickard's Schmetterling'	2012	H5	white/purple	no	8+ × 8	
M. 'Spectrum'	2012	H6	pale pink/purple	no	8 × 8	
M. sprengeri var. diva 'Burncoose'	2012	H6	purple/white	no	12 × 8	
M. sprengeri var. diva 'Copeland Court'	2012	H6	bright pink	no	8 × 8	
M. sprengeri var. diva 'Eric Savill'	2012	H6	bright pink/pale pink	no	12 × 8	
M. 'Star Wars'	2002	H5	rose pink, double	yes	8 × 4	
M. stellata 'Centennial'	2012	H6	white/pink	yes	2.5 × 4	
M. stellata 'Jane Platt'	2012	H6	pale pink	yes	2.5 × 4	
M. stellata 'Royal Star'	2012	H6	white	yes	4 × 4	
M. 'Susan'	1993	H6	purple/pink	yes	4 × 4	
M. 'Sweetheart'	2012	H5	pink	yes	6 × 4	
M. wilsonii	1993	H6	white/crimson	yes	8 × 8	
M. 'Yellow Lantern'	2012	H6	pale yellow	no	5 × 5	

== Withdrawn ==
Name	Type	Flower colour	Dimensions h × w
M. grandiflora 'Exmouth'	tree f	double white	8–12 m (26–39 ft) × 8–12 m (26–39 ft)
'Lennei'	shrub f	purple/white	4–8 m (13–26 ft) × 2.5–4 m (8–13 ft)
M. obovata	tree	cream	12–15 m (39–49 ft) × 8–12 m (26–39 ft)
'Rustica Rubra'	shrub f	rose-pink	4–8 m (13–26 ft) × 4–8 m (13–26 ft)
M. salicifolia	tree	white, fragrant	8–12 m (26–39 ft) × 4–8 m (13–26 ft)
M. stellata	shrub	white	1.5–2.5 m (5–8 ft) × 2.5–4 m (8–13 ft)
M. stellata 'Water Lily'	shrub	white	1.5–2.5 m (5–8 ft) × 2.5–4 m (8–13 ft)
