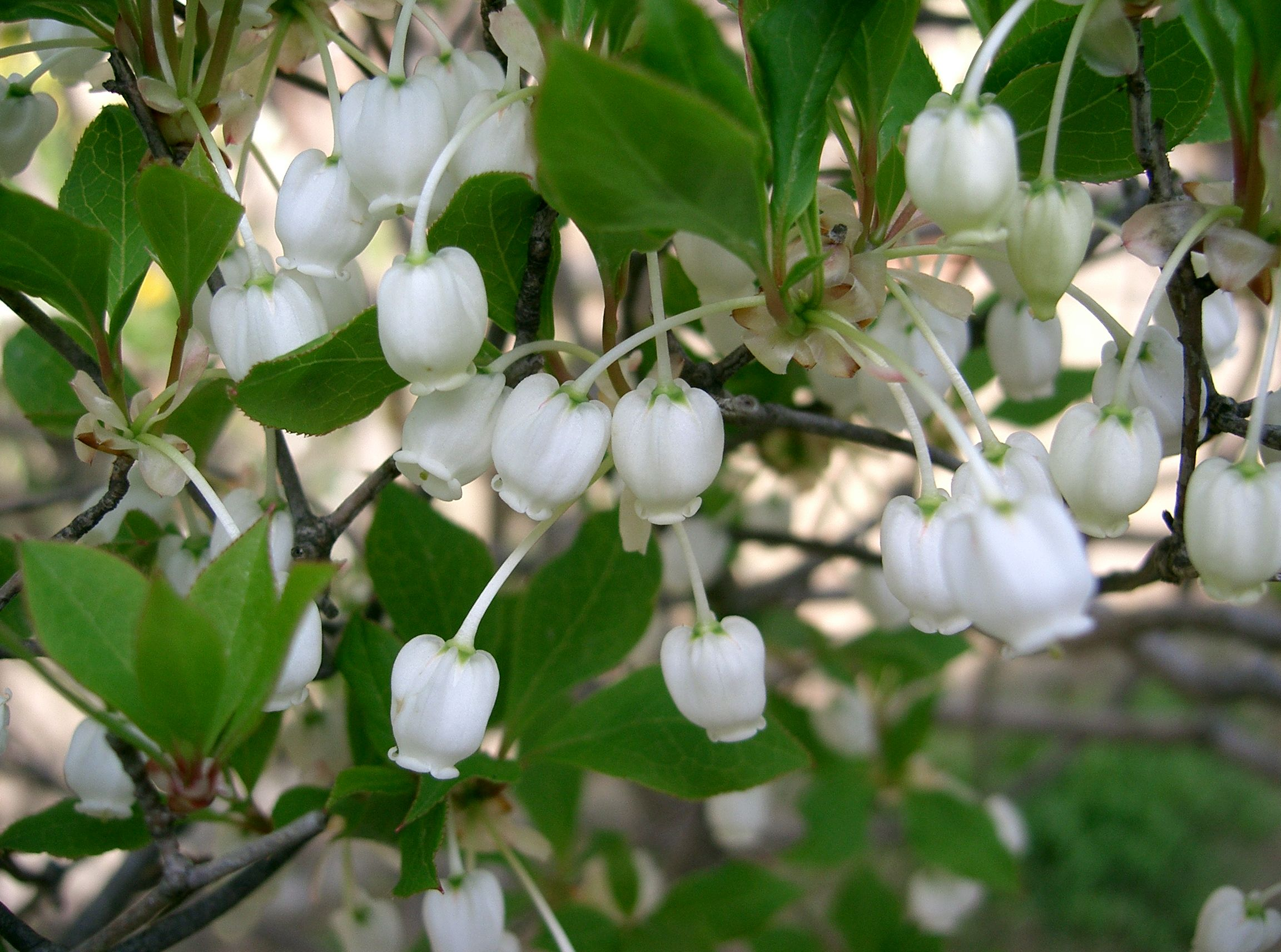
- Enkianthus perulatus

Scientific classification
- Kingdom: Plantae
- Clade: Embryophytes
- Clade: Tracheophytes
- Clade: Angiosperms
- Clade: Eudicots
- Clade: Asterids
- Order: Ericales
- Family: Ericaceae
- Subfamily: Enkianthoideae; Kron & al.
- Genus: Enkianthus; Lour.

Species
- 12-15, see text

Synonyms
- Bodinieriella H.Lév.; Enkyanthus DC.; Meisteria Siebold & Zucc.; Melidora Noronha ex Salisb.; Tritomodon Turcz.

= Enkianthus =

Genus of flowering plants in the heather family

Enkianthus is a genus of shrubs or small trees in the heath family, Ericaceae. Its native range is in Asia, as far west as the eastern Himalayas, as far south as Indochina, and as far north and east as China and Japan.

This genus is considered cladistically the most basal member of the Ericaceae, that is, the descendant of the common ancestor of that Ericaceae that branched earliest from the rest of that family. It is classified as the sole member of the subfamily Enkianthoideae.

== Species ==
Twelve to fifteen species are included in the genus by various authors. Species include:

Image	Name	Common name	Distribution
	Enkianthus campanulatus (Miq.) G. Nicholson	redvein enkianthus	Japan
	Enkianthus cernuus (Sieb. & Zucc.) Benth. & Hook. f. ex Makino		Japan
	Enkianthus chinensis Franch.		China
	Enkianthus deflexus (Griff.) C.K.Schneid.		China, Himalaya, Nepal
	Enkianthus nudipes (Honda) Ohwi		
	Enkianthus pallidiflorus Craib		
	Enkianthus pauciflorus E.H.Wilson		China
	Enkianthus perulatus C.K.Schneid.		China, Japan
	Enkianthus quinqueflorus Lour.		China
	Enkianthus recurvus Craib		
	Enkianthus ruber Dop		Vietnam
	Enkianthus sikokianus (Palib.) Ohwi		
	Enkianthus subsessilis (Miq.) Makino		
	Enkianthus serotinus Chun & W.P.Fang		China
	Enkianthus serrulatus (E.H.Wilson) C.K.Schneid.		China
	Enkianthus taiwanianus T.S.Ying		Taiwan
	Enkianthus tectus Craib		
	Enkianthus tubulatus P. C. Tam.		

== Cultivation ==
Several species are found in cultivation, notably E. campanulatus, E. cernuus and E. perulatus. E. cernuus f. rubens (drooping red enkianthus) has gained the Royal Horticultural Society's Award of Garden Merit.
