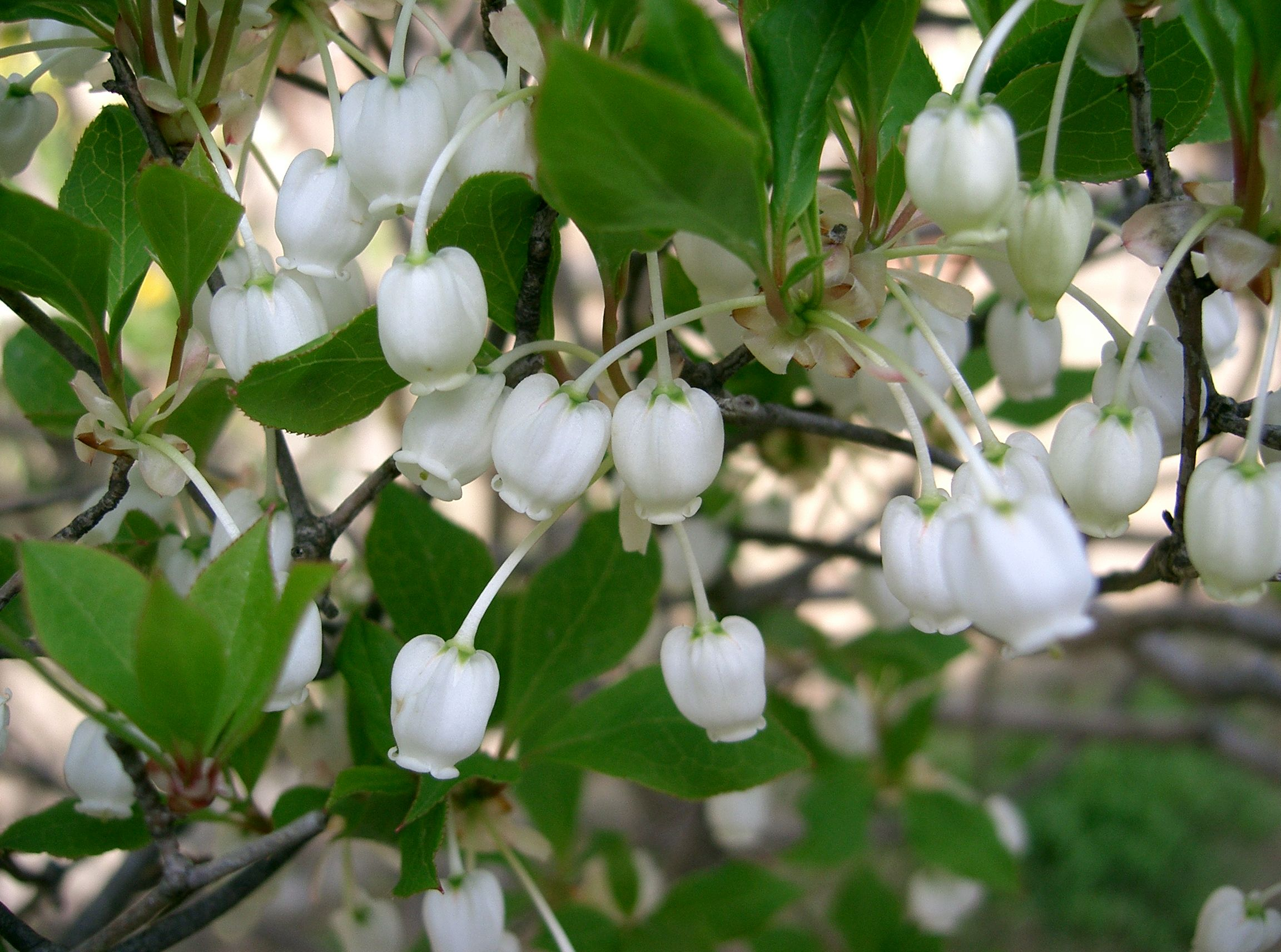

Scientific classification
- Kingdom: Plantae
- Clade: Tracheophytes
- Clade: Angiosperms
- Clade: Eudicots
- Clade: Asterids
- Order: Ericales
- Family: Ericaceae
- Genus: Enkianthus
- Species: E. perulatus

Binomial name
- Enkianthus perulatus C.K.Schneid.

= Enkianthus perulatus =

Species of flowering plant

Enkianthus perulatus (dodan-tsutsuji) is a species of flowering plant in the family Ericaceae, native to Japan. It is a compact, slow-growing, deciduous shrub eventually growing to 2 m (6 ft 7 in) tall and wide. Pendent umbels of pure white, bell-shaped flowers in spring are followed in autumn by brilliant red and yellow leaf colours. Its leaves are ovate and medium to bright green in colour. It grows in sunny woodland areas.

In cultivation this plant has gained the Royal Horticultural Society's Award of Garden Merit.

It is the flower of Chizu, Tottori, where a doudan tsutsuji festival is held in May.

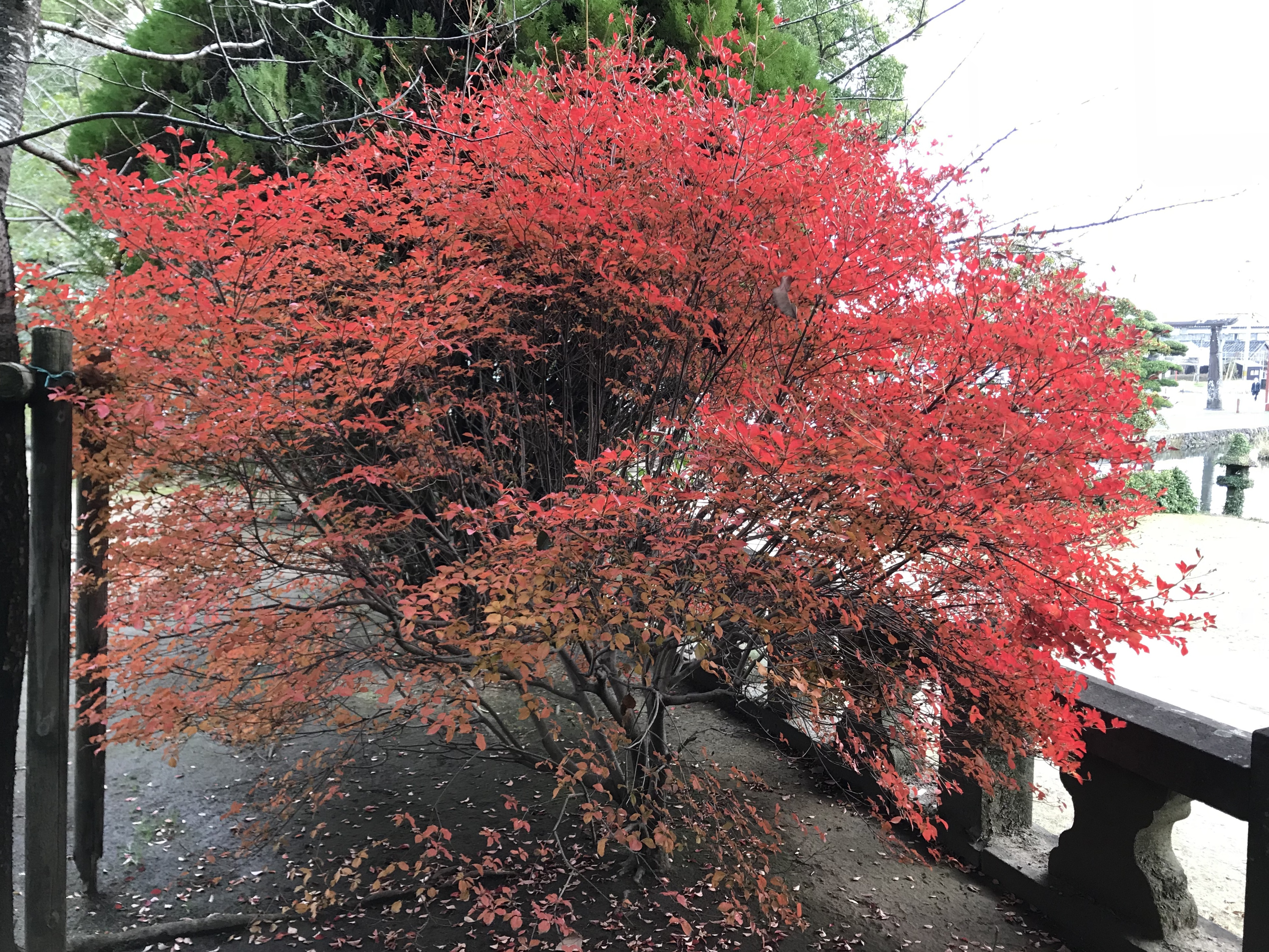
Okayama Shrine, Ogi Park
