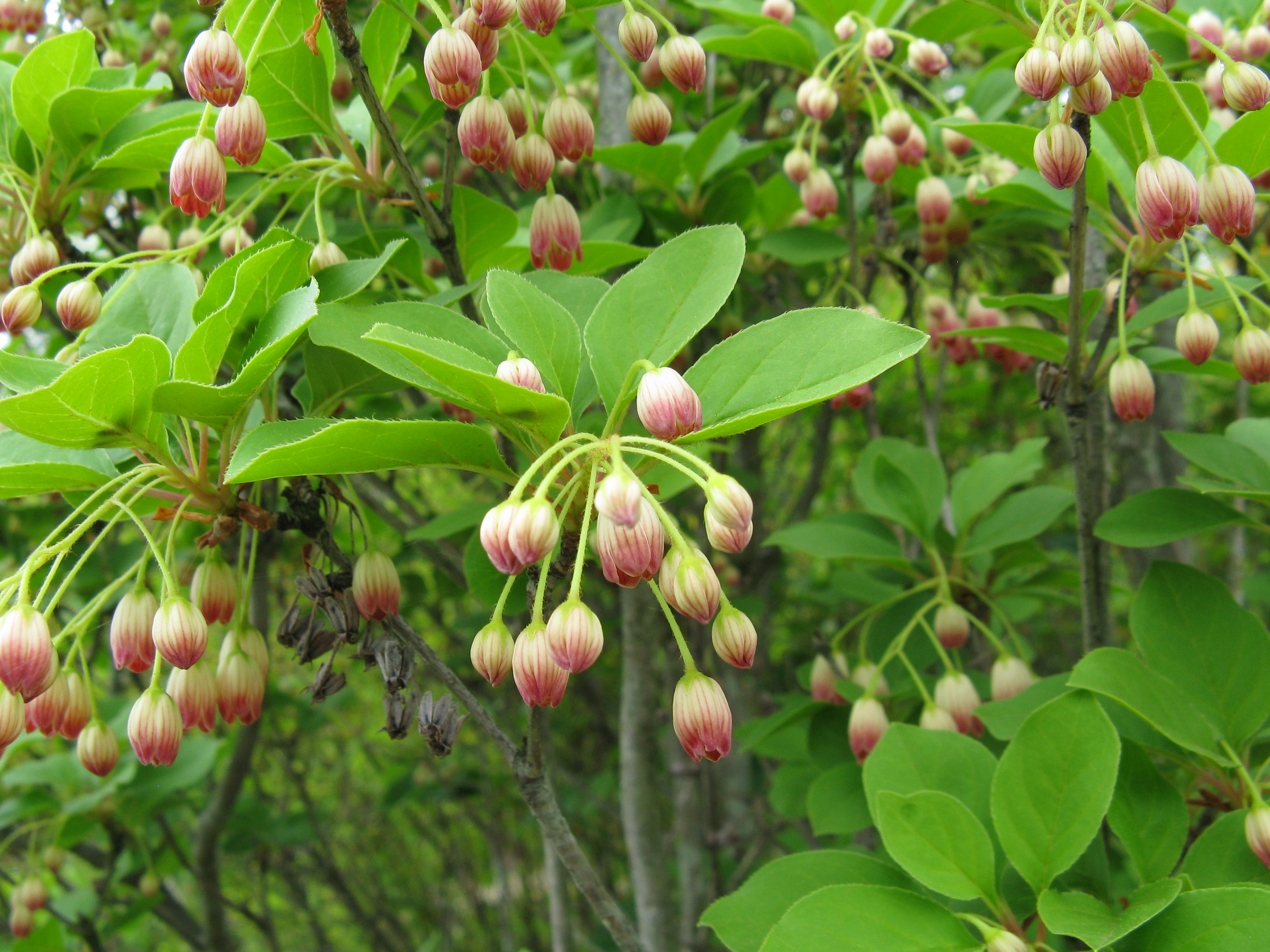

Scientific classification
- Kingdom: Plantae
- Clade: Tracheophytes
- Clade: Angiosperms
- Clade: Eudicots
- Clade: Asterids
- Order: Ericales
- Family: Ericaceae
- Genus: Enkianthus
- Species: E. campanulatus

Binomial name
- Enkianthus campanulatus (Miq.) G.Nicholson

= Enkianthus campanulatus =

Species of flowering plant

The hardiest of Enkianthus species is E. campanulatus (furin-tsutsuji or redvein enkianthus), a medium-sized, narrow, upright, deciduous shrub. Its bright green glossy foliage gives brilliant coppery to red fall colors. In spring it offers a profusion of bell-shaped (campanula, "little bell"), creamy white flowers with red veins, similar to those of the distantly related Pieris.

The plant was brought to England by Charles Maries, who was plant-hunting in Japan at the time for Veitch Nurseries. The shrub can exceed expectations of height under the right circumstances, as at William Robinson's Gravetye Manor, where a pair planted about the turn of the 20th century reached 15 ft (5 m).

== Characteristics ==
Exposure: Full sun to part shade
Spacing: 4' to 5' apart
Average height x width: 10' tall x 5' wide
Fertilizing: Fertilize in spring just before new growth begins
Cold hardiness: -20 °F
Water use: Keep soil evenly moist. Prefers acid, well-drained soil.

Widely cultivated as an ornamental plant in parks and gardens, this plant has gained the Royal Horticultural Society's Award of Garden Merit.
