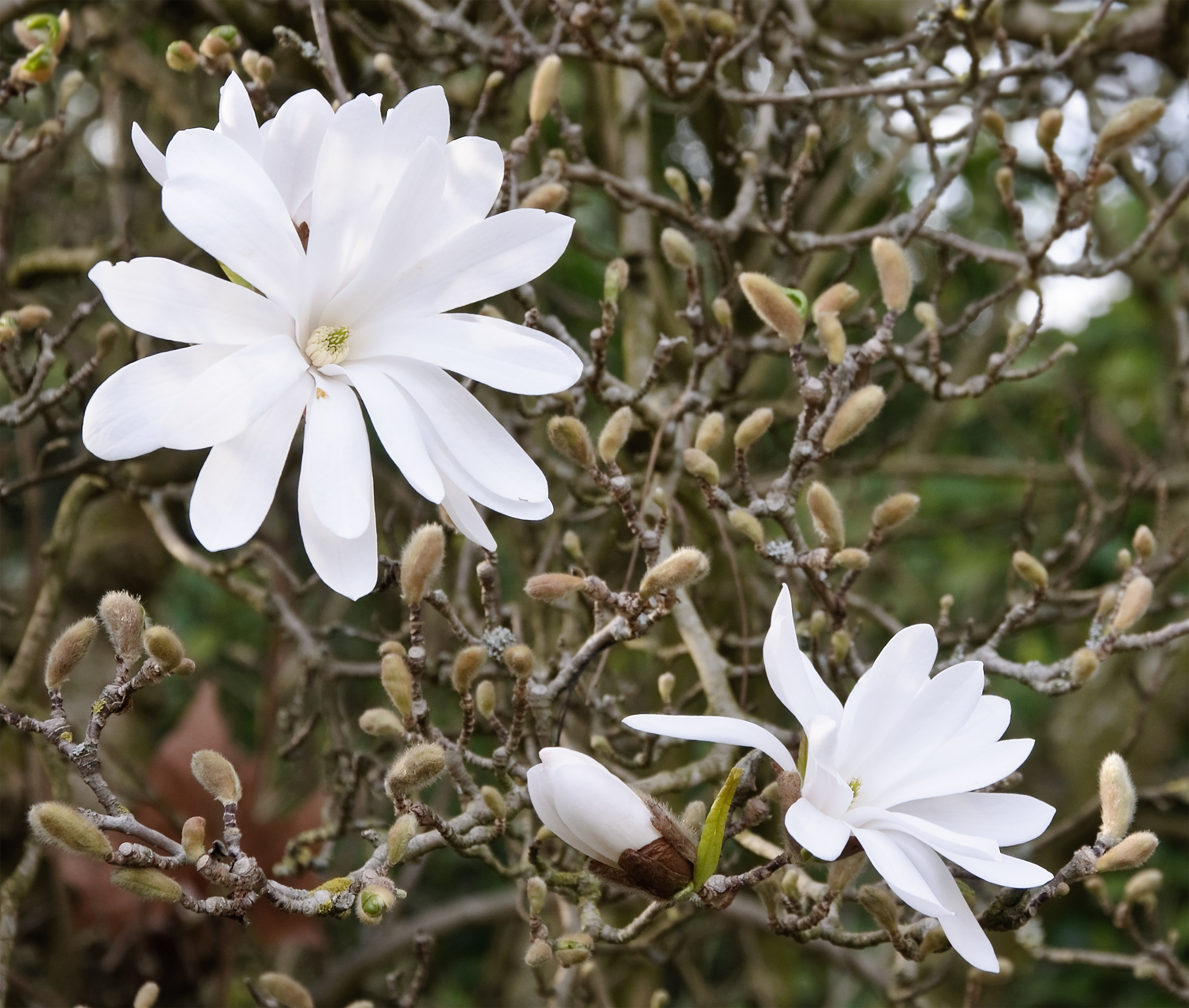

Conservation status
- Endangered (IUCN 3.1)

Scientific classification
- Kingdom: Plantae
- Clade: Embryophytes
- Clade: Tracheophytes
- Clade: Spermatophytes
- Clade: Angiosperms
- Clade: Magnoliids
- Order: Magnoliales
- Family: Magnoliaceae
- Genus: Magnolia
- Subgenus: Magnolia subg. Yulania
- Section: Magnolia sect. Yulania
- Subsection: Magnolia subsect. Yulania
- Species: M. stellata

Binomial name
- Magnolia stellata (Siebold & Zucc.) Maxim.

Synonyms
- Buergeria stellata Siebold & Zucc.; Magnolia halleana Anon.; Magnolia keiskei (Makino) Ihrig; Magnolia kobus f. rosea (Veitch ex Hu) Blackburn; Magnolia kobus var. stellata (Siebold & Zucc.) Blackburn; Magnolia kobus f. stellata (Siebold & Zucc.) Blackburn; Magnolia rosea (Veitch ex Hu) Ihrig; Magnolia simii Siebold ex Miq.; Magnolia stellata var. keiskei Makino; Magnolia stellata f. rosea (J.H.Veitch) Schelle; Magnolia stellata var. rosea J.H.Veitch; Magnolia velutina P.Parm.; Talauma stellata (Siebold & Zucc.) Miq.; Yulania stellata (Siebold & Zucc.) Sima & S.G.Lu

= Magnolia stellata =

Species of shrub or tree

Magnolia stellata, the star magnolia, is a slow-growing deciduous shrub or small tree native to Japan. It bears large, showy white or pink flowers in early spring, before its leaves open. This species is closely related to the Kobushi magnolia (Magnolia kobus), Magnolia stellata was accepted as a distinct species in the 1998 monograph by Hunt.

== Description ==
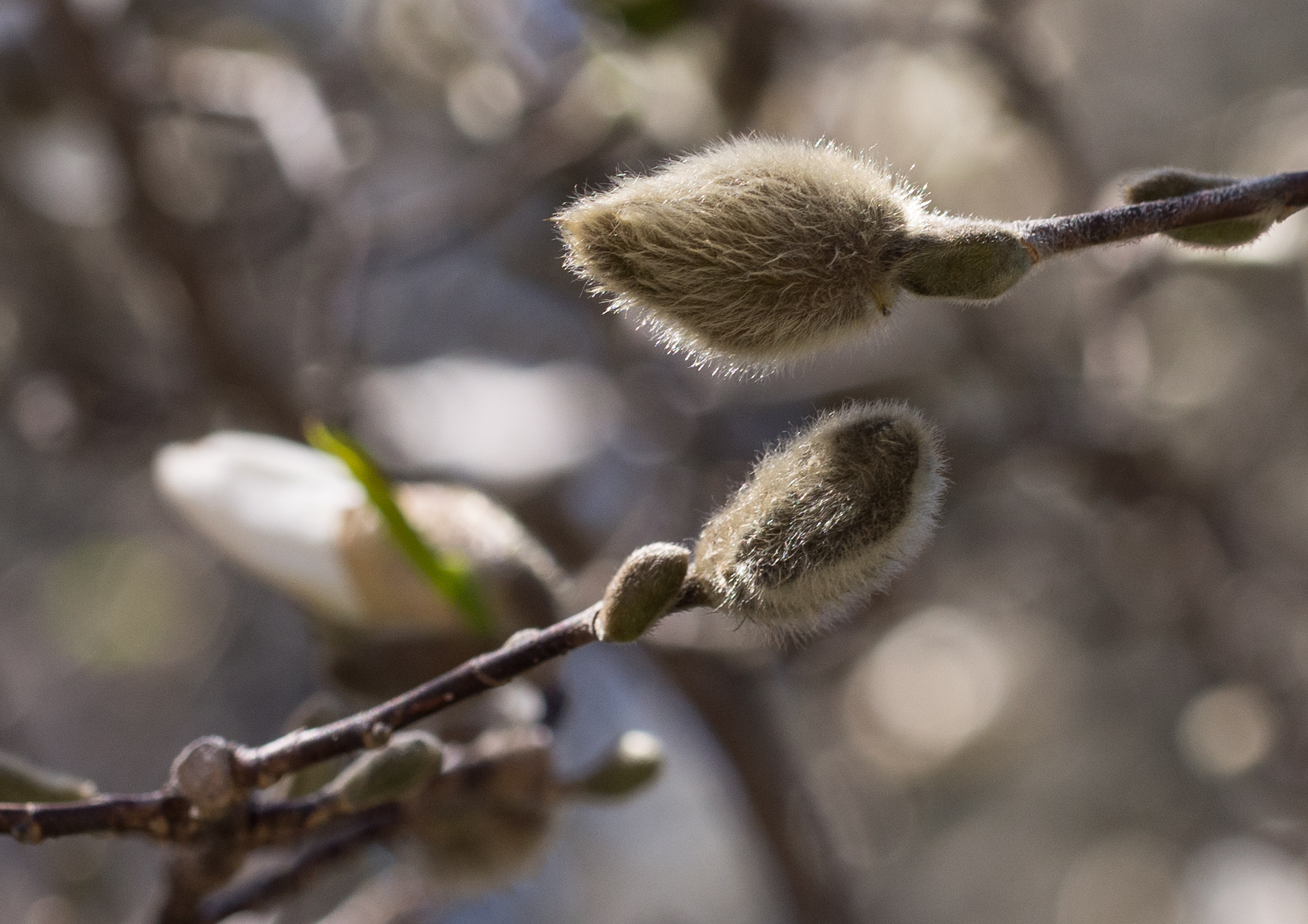
Buds

This shrub grows 1.5 to 2.5 metres (5 to 8 ft) in height, spreading to 4.6 m (15 ft) in width at maturity. Young plants display upright oval growth, but the plants spread and mound with age.

M. stellata blooms at a young age, with the slightly fragrant 7–10 cm (3–4 in) wide flowers covering the bare plant in late winter or early spring before the leaves appear. There is natural variation within the flower colour, from white to rich pink; the pink also changes from year to year. The flowers are star-shaped, with at least 12 thin, delicate petal-like tepals, some cultivars having more than 30.

The leaves open bronze-green, turning to deep green as they mature, and yellow before dropping in autumn. They are oblong and about 10 cm (4 in) long by about 4 cm (1.6 in) wide.

M. stellata produces a reddish-green, knobby aggregate fruit about 5 cm (2 in) long that matures in early autumn. Mature fruit opens by slits to reveal orange-red seeds, but the fruits often drop before developing fully.

Young twigs have smooth, shiny chestnut brown bark, while the main trunks have smooth, silvery grey bark. Like the saucer magnolia (Magnolia × soulangeana), it is deciduous, revealing a twiggy, naked frame in winter. Plants have thick, fleshy roots which are found fairly close to the surface and do not tolerate much disturbance.

== Origins ==
The species Magnolia stellata may be found growing wild in certain parts of the Ise Bay area of central Honshū, Japan’s largest island, at elevations of 50 to 600 m (160 to 1,970 ft). It grows by streams and in moist, boggy areas with such other woody plants as Enkianthus cernuus, Corylopsis glabrescens var. gotoana and Berberis sieboldii.

== Hybrids ==
- Magnolia × loebneri = Magnolia kobus × Magnolia stellata.

The cross was first made by Max Löebner in Germany in the early 20^{th} century. The hybrid first flowered in 1917. Other varieties are produced by these parents such as; ‘Ballerina’ (which was raised by Joe Mcdaniel in Illinois and registered in 1969, they have white tepals with blushed pink bases), ‘Donna’ (which was raised by Harry Heineman before 1994 and was named for his wife, they have white tepals), ‘Encore’ (which is an open-pollinated seedling of ‘Ballerina’ and was selected by August Kehr in 1988, they have white flowers), ‘Leonard Messel’ (which was raised by James Comber in Sussex and was registered in 1955, they have a soft lilac-pink colour with deeper bases).

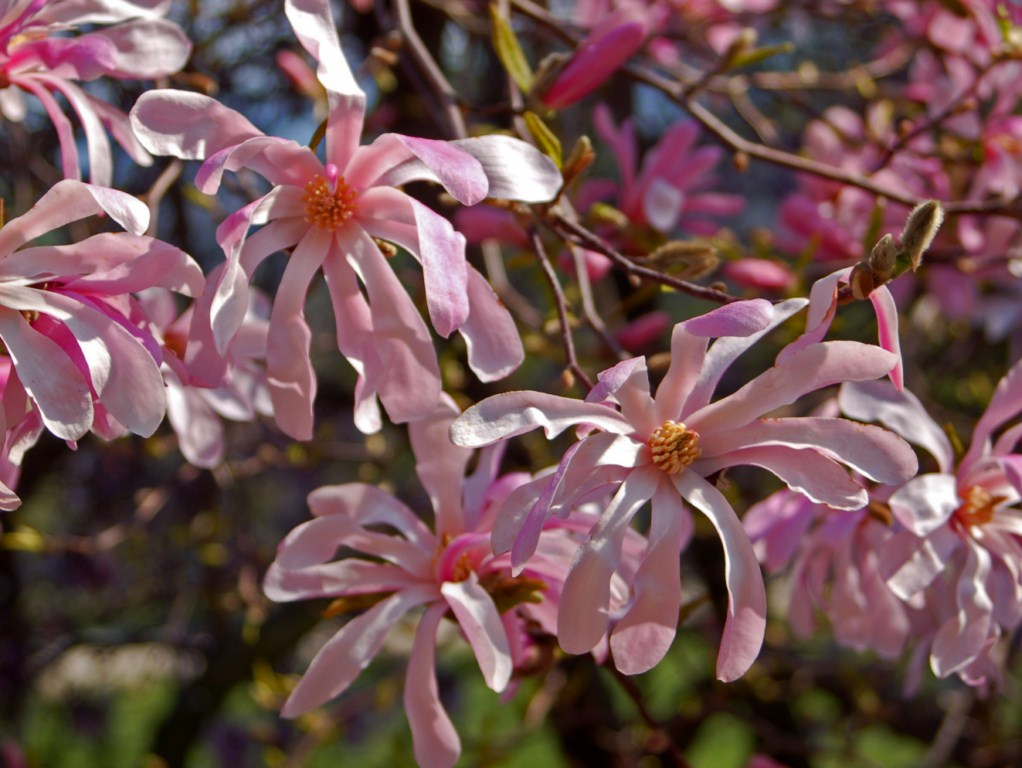
'Leonard Messel'

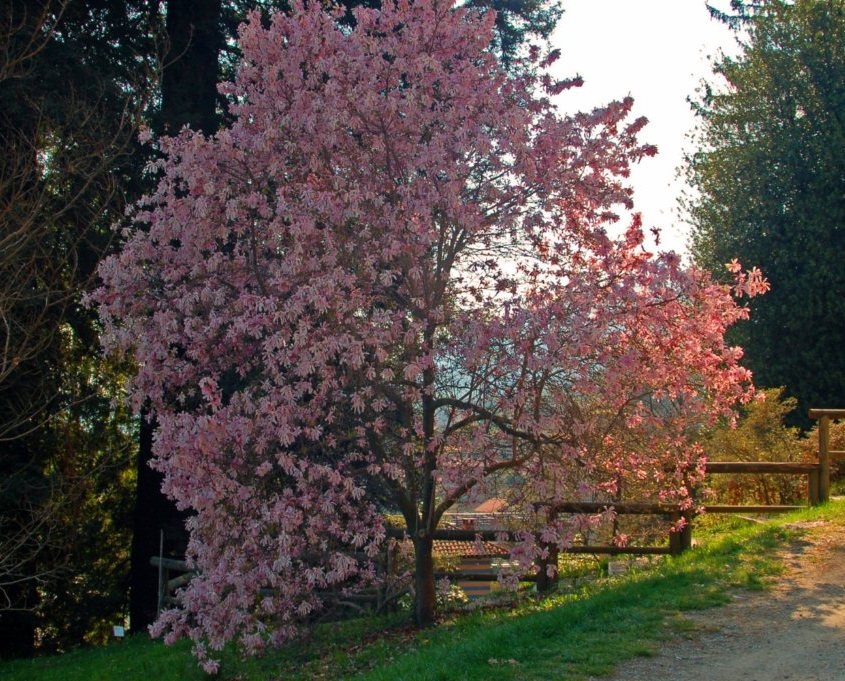
- Magnolia × proctoriana = Magnolia salicifolia × Magnolia stellata. The hybrid of these closely related species was first obtained in 1925 at the Arnold Arboretum of Harvard University.
- Magnolia liliiflora × Magnolia stellata, hybrid obtained at the US National Arboretum by Francis DeVos and William Corsair. There are in the trade eight varieties with women's names, the "Eight Little Girls".

== Cultivation ==
After it was introduced to the United States in 1862 by Dr. George Robert Hall (1820-1899), Magnolia stellata has been widely cultivated in much of North America, and has been recorded as an established escape in a few places. It is also a commonly grown ornamental in Europe, and was first introduced to the United Kingdom in 1877 or 1878.

Its compact size makes it an ideal subject for smaller gardens, where its flowers - appearing initially on bare stems - provide some much needed colour in early Spring. The cultivars 'Centennial', 'Jane Platt', and 'Royal Star' have all gained the Royal Horticultural Society's Award of Garden Merit.

Spring frosts can damage the flowers. The shrub prefers deep, acidic soil. It may be propagated by seed, or more easily by rooting cuttings taken after the flower buds have formed.

== Gallery ==
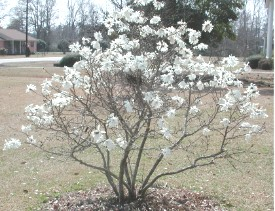

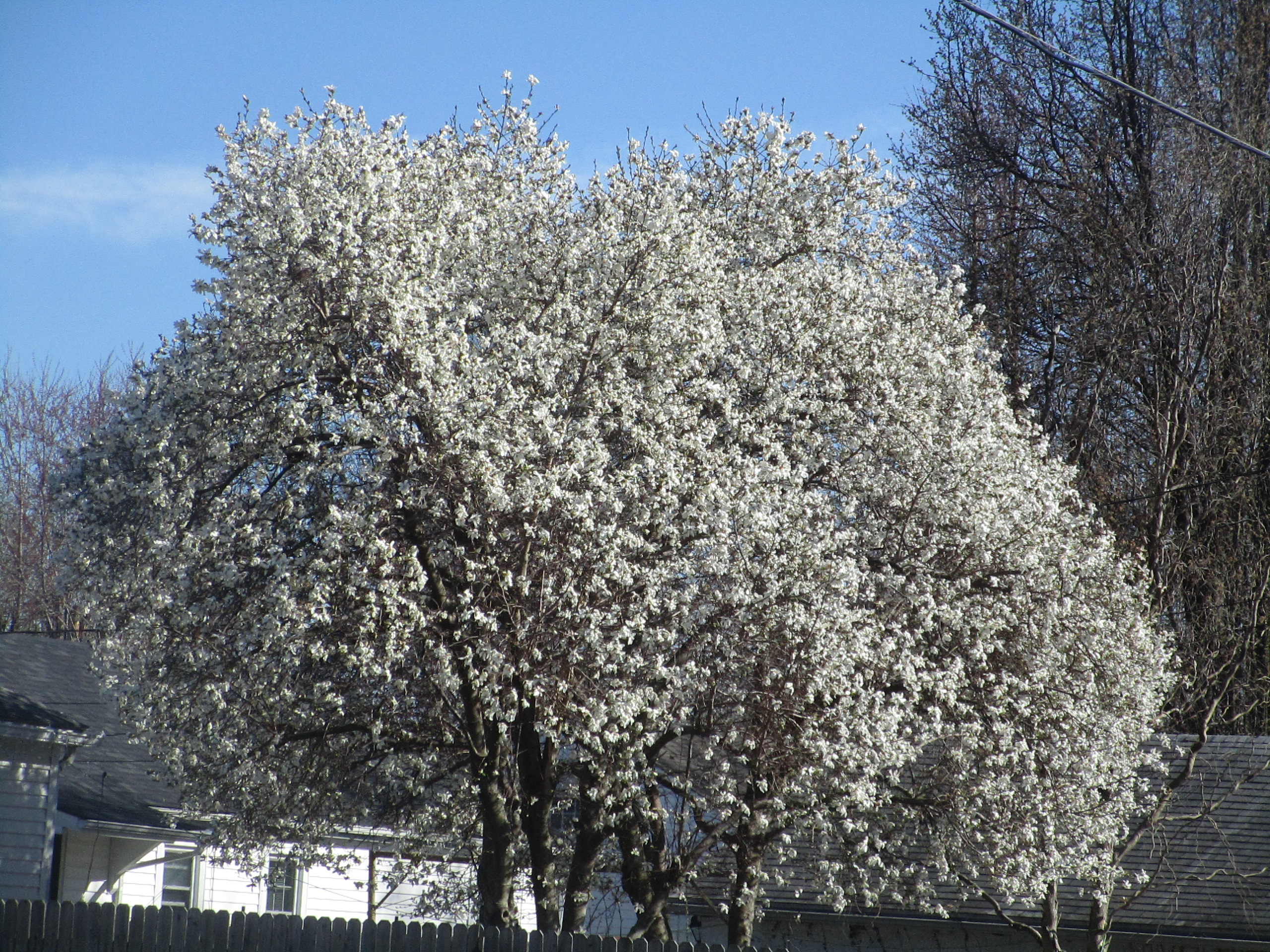

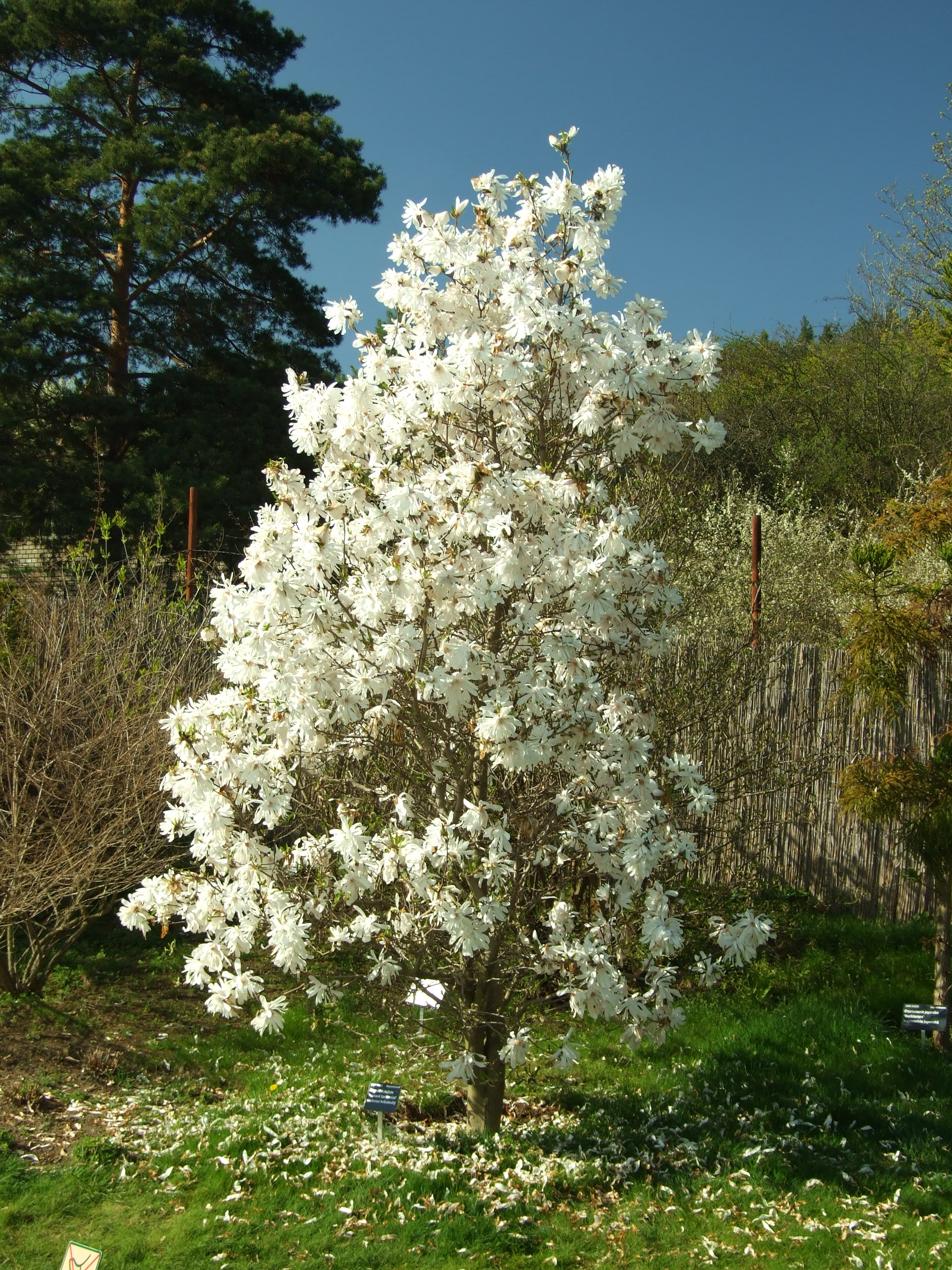

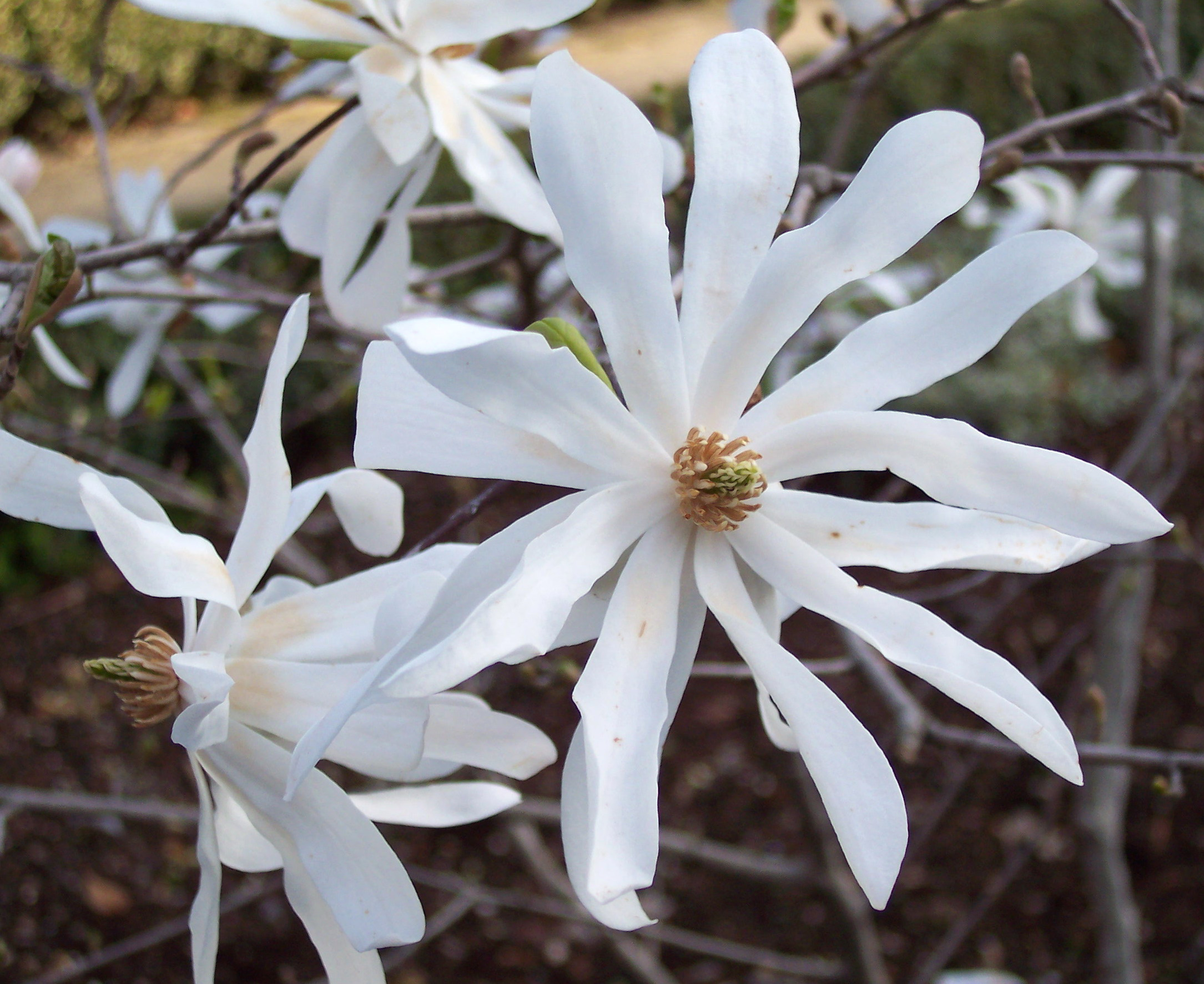

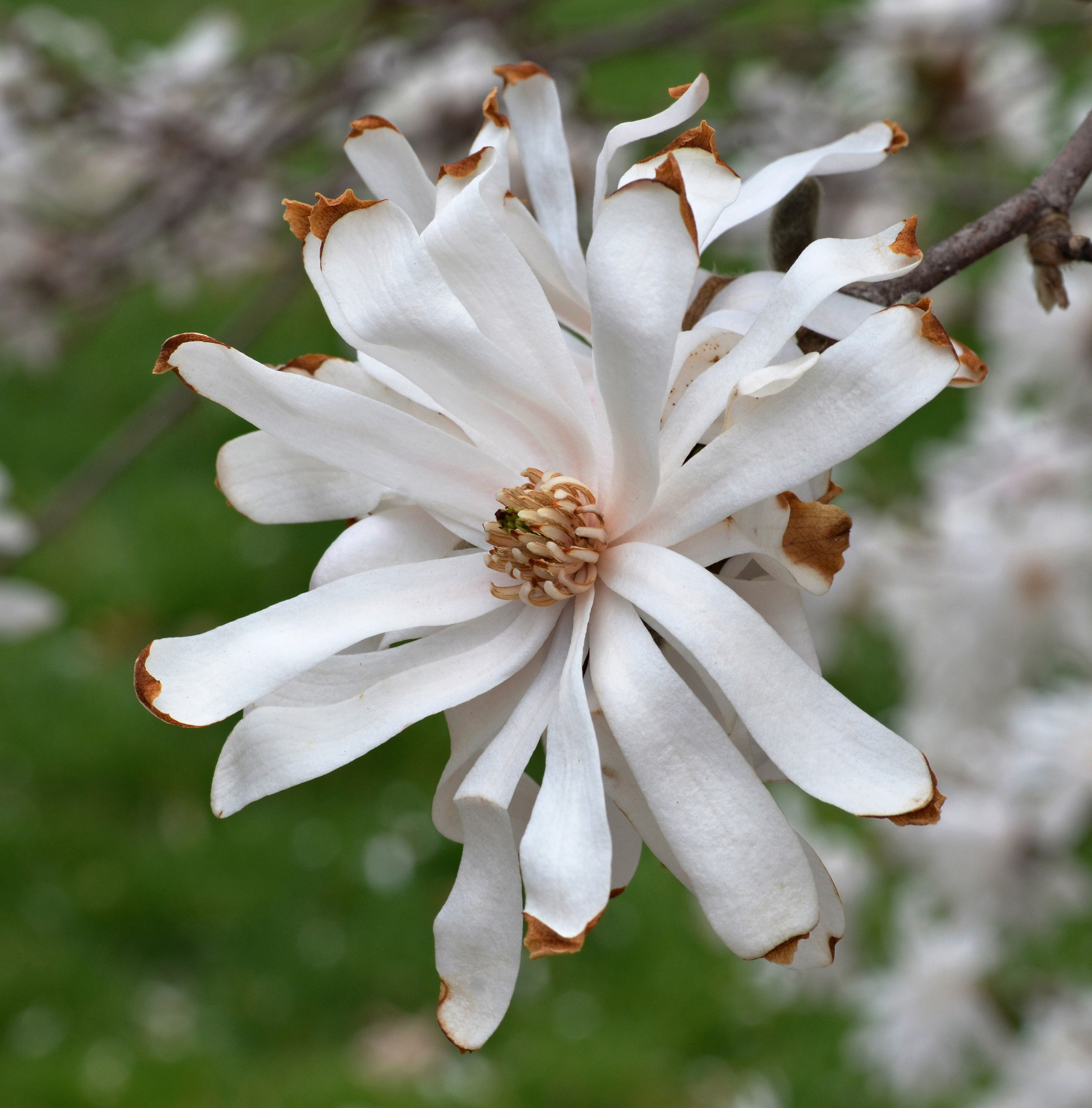
'Royal Star'

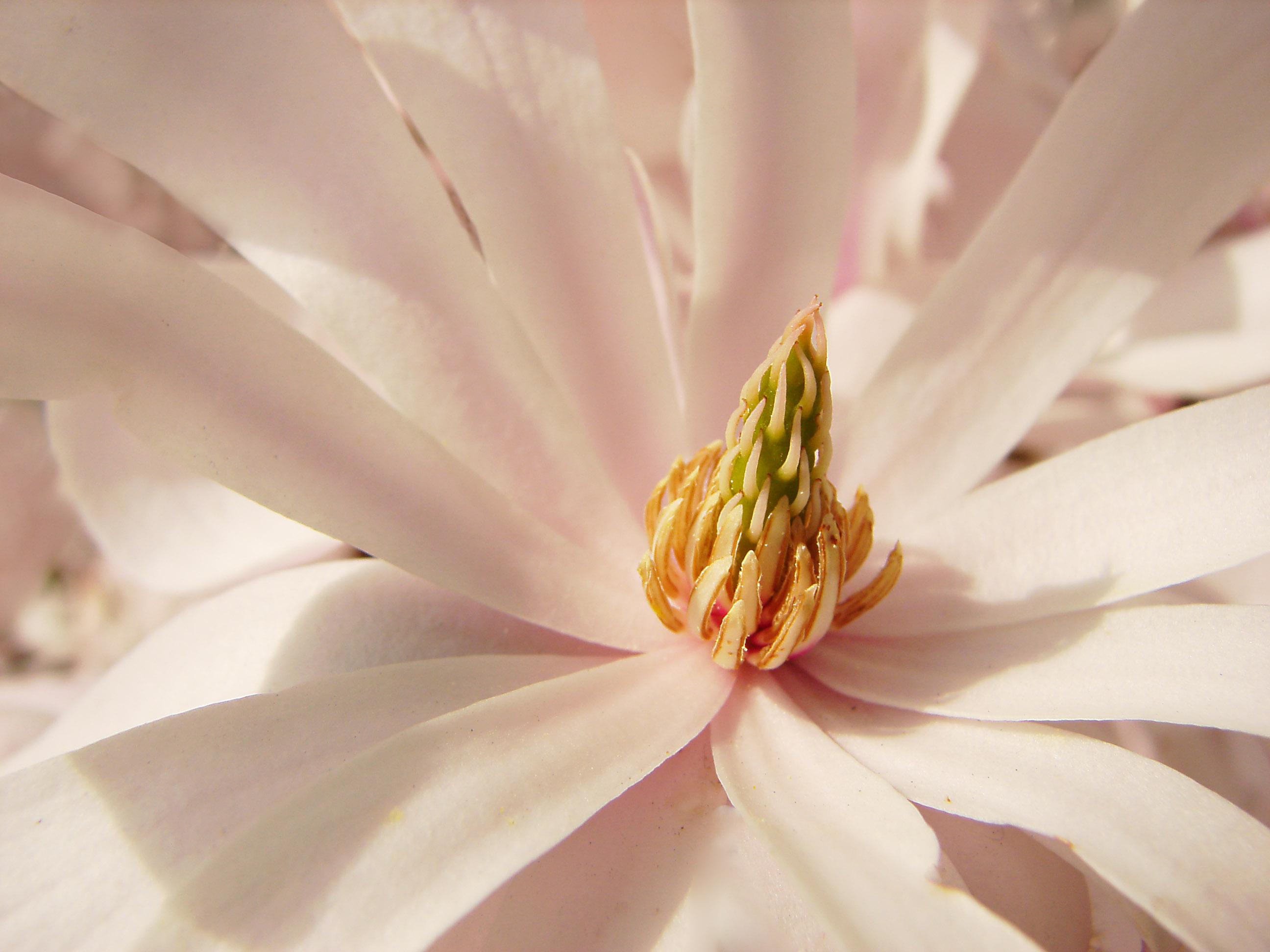

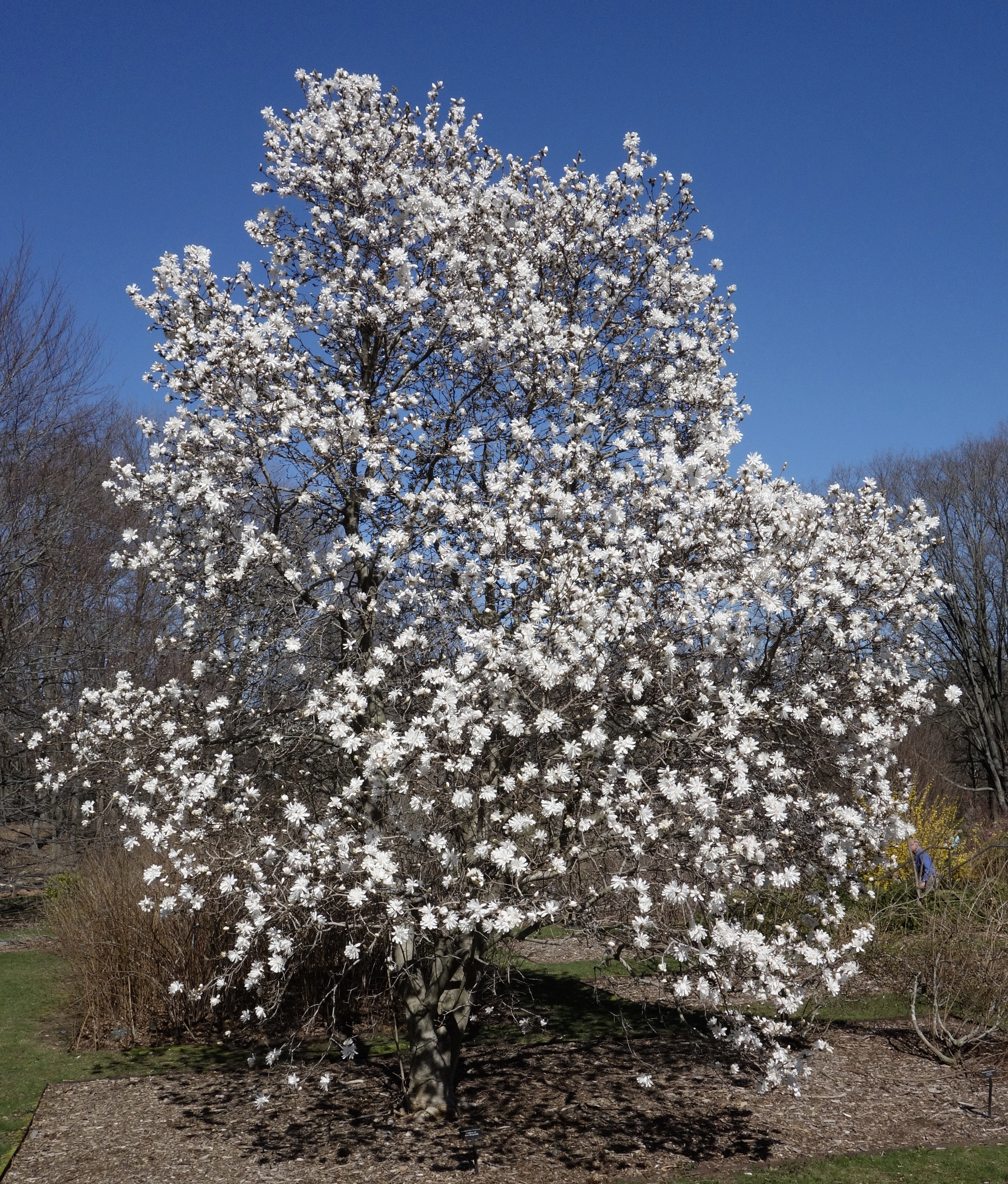
‘Centennial'

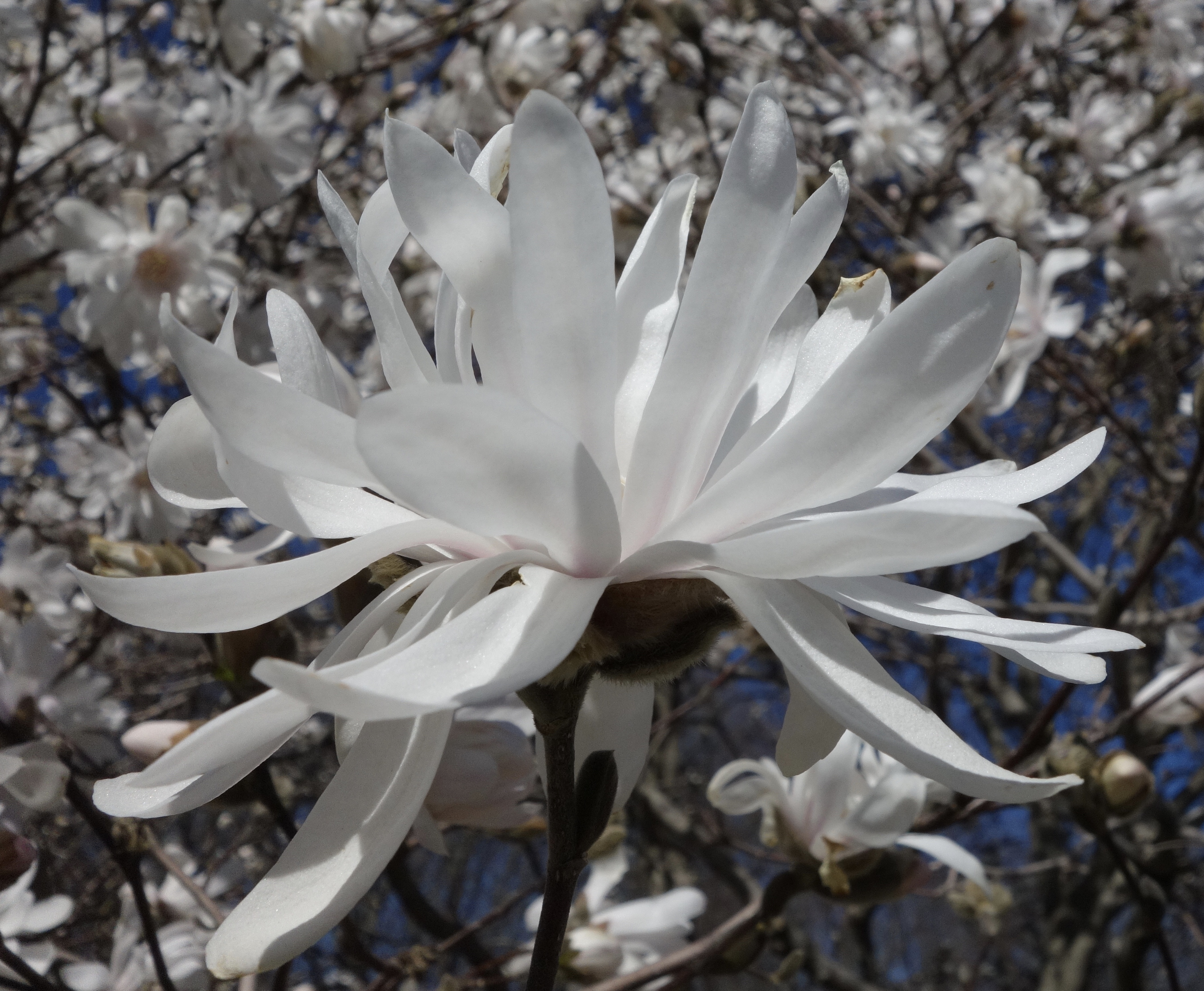

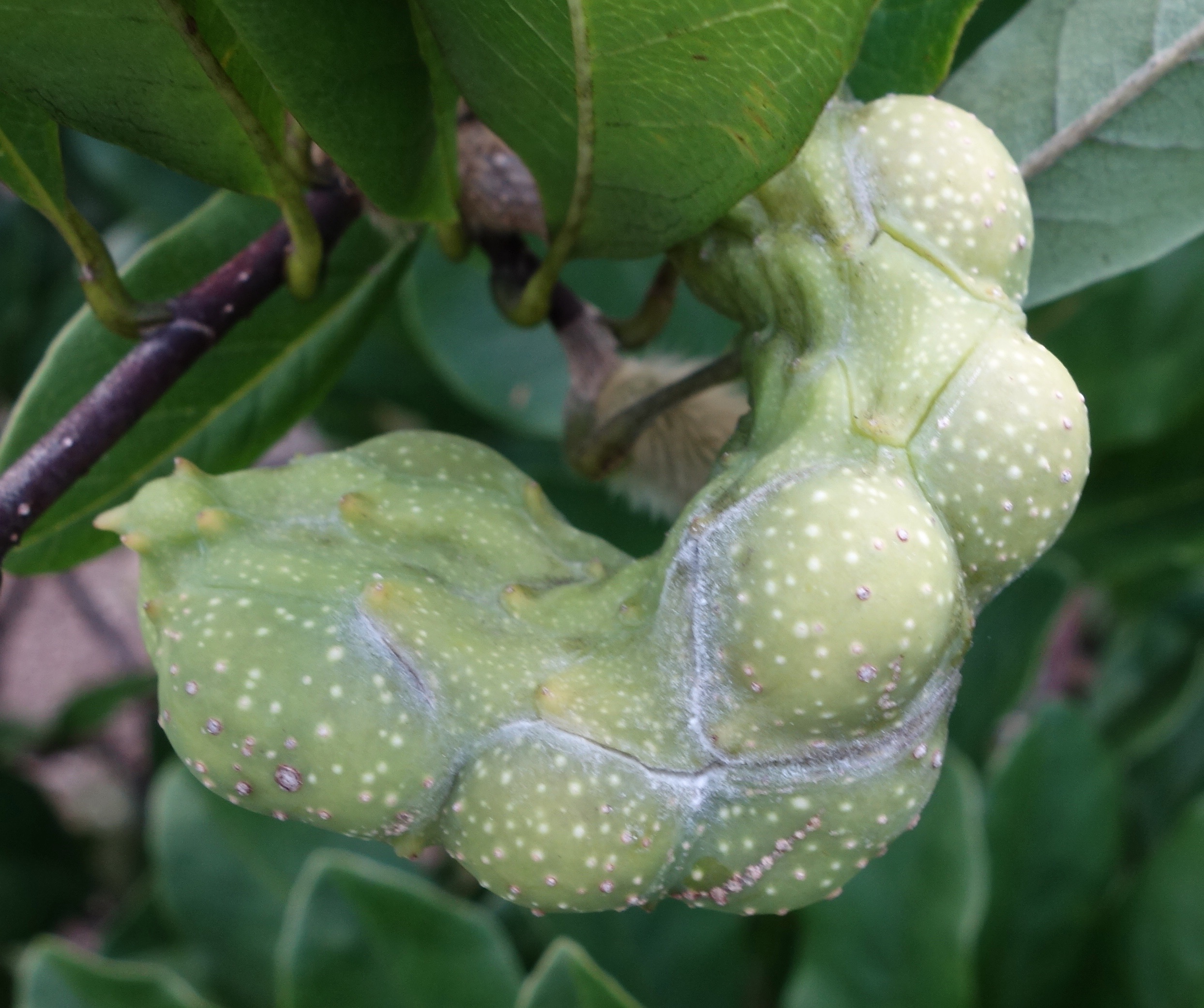
Immature fruit

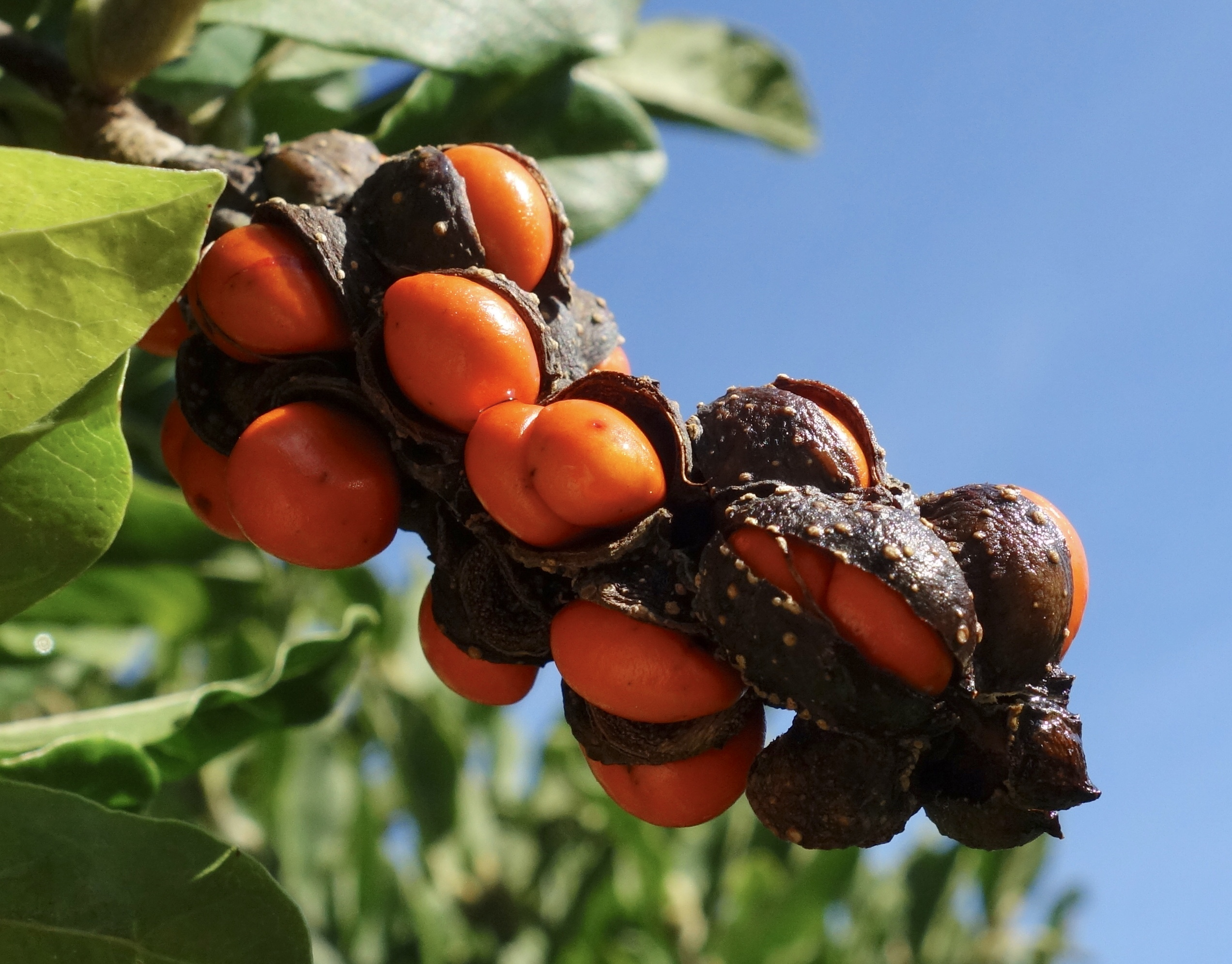
Mature fruit with seeds

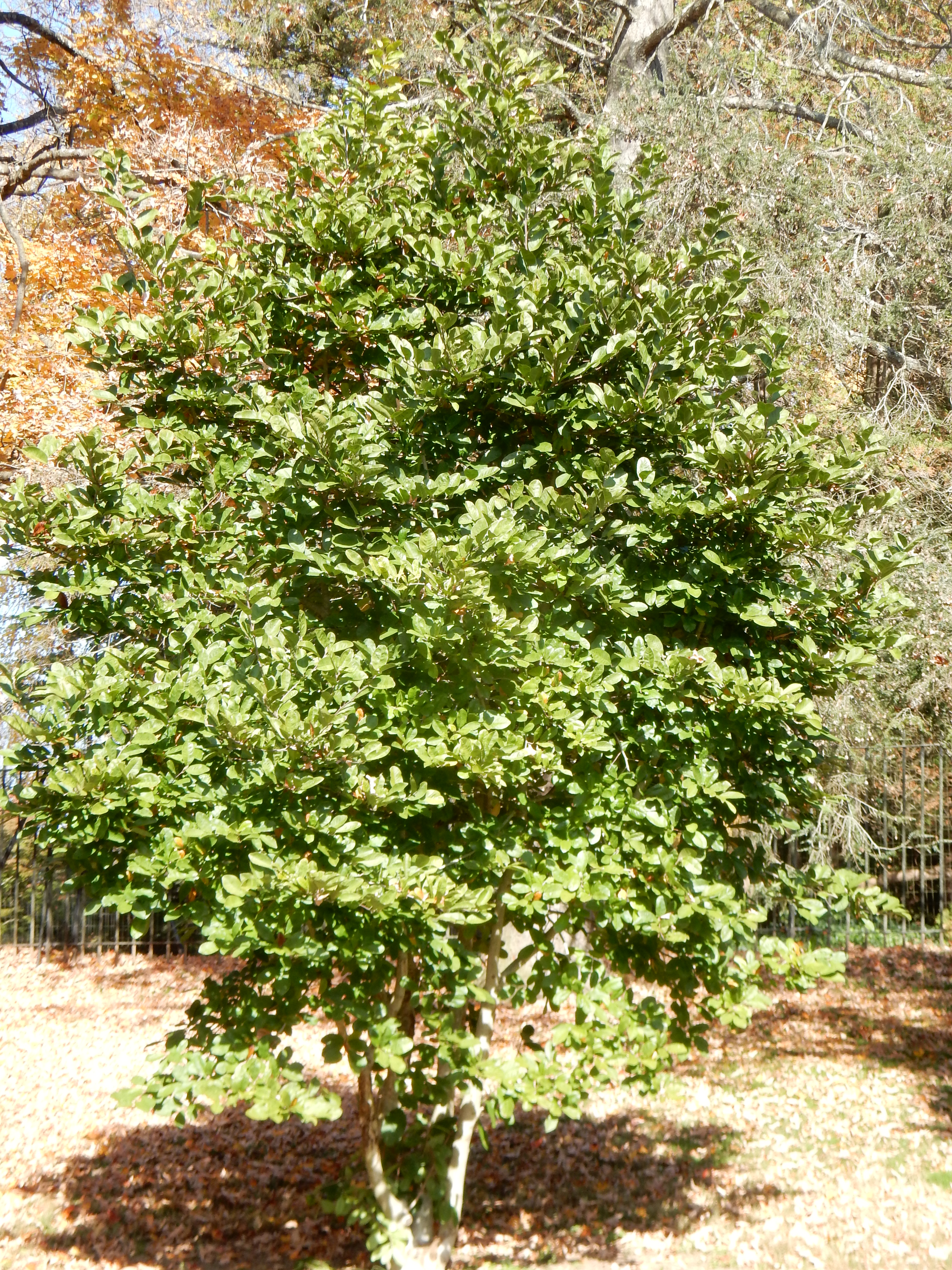
In autumn
