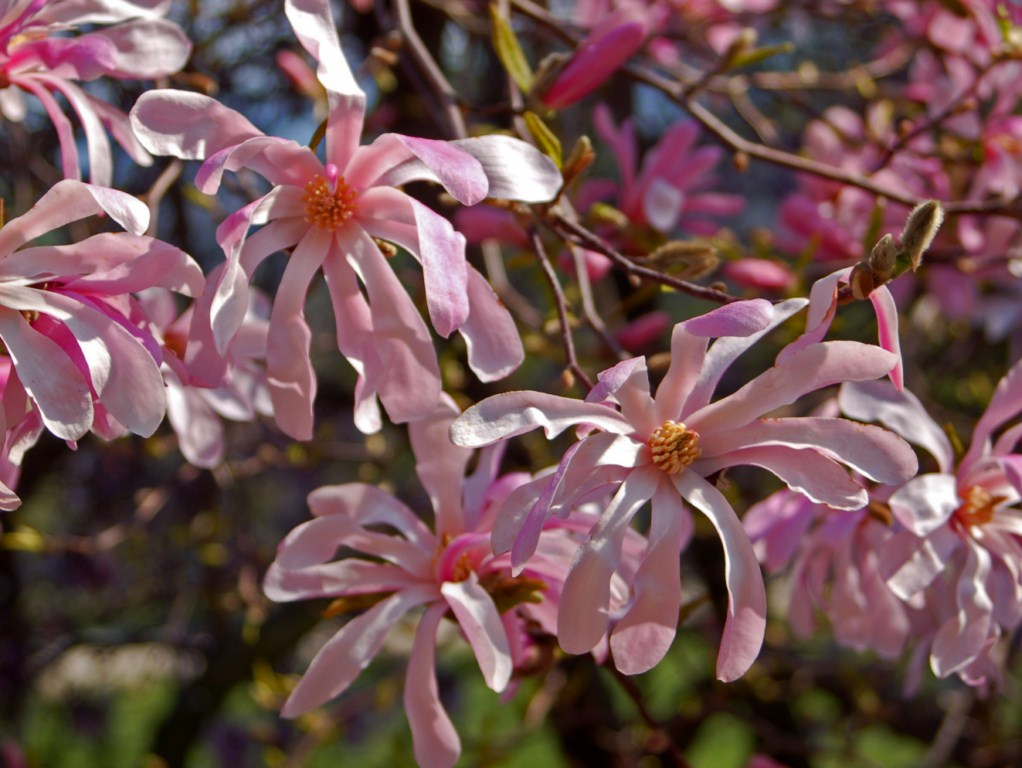
- Flowers of 'Leonard Messel' at Burcina Park, Biella, Italy

Scientific classification
- Kingdom: Plantae
- Clade: Tracheophytes
- Clade: Angiosperms
- Clade: Magnoliids
- Order: Magnoliales
- Family: Magnoliaceae
- Genus: Magnolia
- Subgenus: Magnolia subg. Yulania
- Section: Magnolia sect. Yulania
- Subsection: Magnolia subsect. Yulania
- Species: M. × loebneri

Binomial name
- Magnolia × loebneri Kache

= Magnolia × loebneri =

Species of tree

Magnolia × loebneri Kache is a hybrid of two Magnolia species, the Japanese Magnolia kobus and M. stellata. crossed by Garteninspektor Max Löbner of Pillnitz, Germany, shortly before World War I; it first flowered in 1917. The deciduous, elegant and compact multi-stemmed small flowering tree or large shrub, slowly attaining a height of 20 ft (6.1 m) and somewhat wider at maturity, is hardy to USDA Zone 4. Its fragrant late flowers, following its stellata parent by a couple of weeks, escape unexpected late spring frosts, but appear on the bare branches, to great effect. The deep pink buds open in informal strap-like tepals with pale shell pink upper surfaces and darker pink-purple lower ones. Like most magnolias, it thrives best on acid soils.

The selection, 'Leonard Messel' was a chance hybrid that was developed at Messel's garden in Sussex, Nymans. This plant has gained the Royal Horticultural Society's Award of Garden Merit. Also on the market are white 'Ballerina' and the late-flowering white 'Merrill' that extend the loebneri season. The ‘White Rose’ cultivar is characterized by an upright flower form whose petals not become floppy and firm tepals that drop only after the blooms have faded. 'White Rose' was an open pollinated seedling of ‘Ballerina.'

Magnolia × loebneri is susceptible to magnolia scale, just like other saucer, star, and lily magnolias. But it is possible to grow healthy specimens with proper cultivation techniques, and by checking that plants are disease free when received.

== Gallery ==
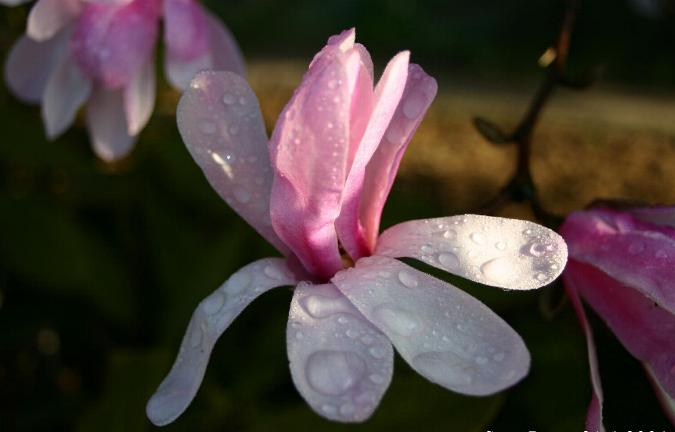

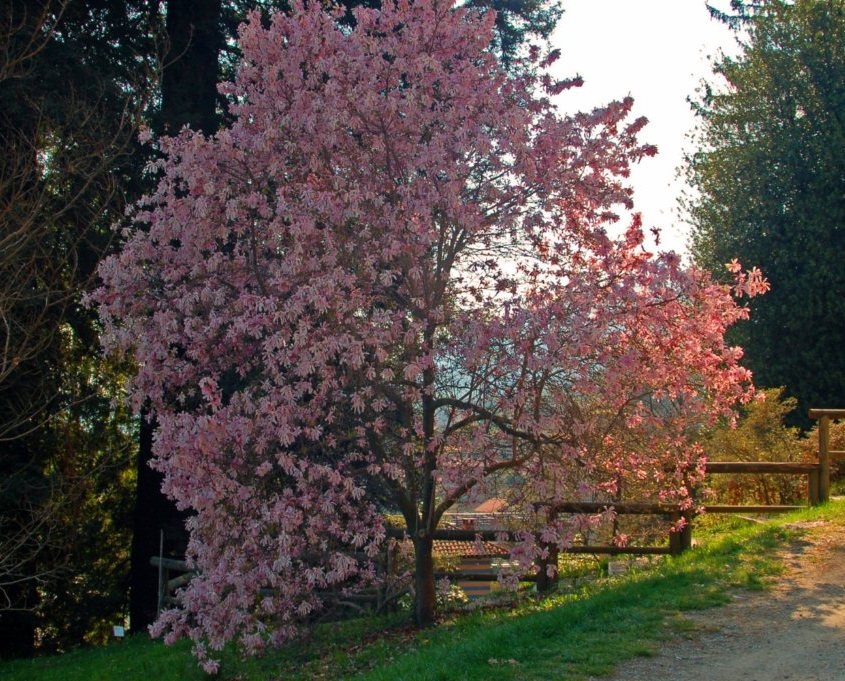
'Leonard Messel'

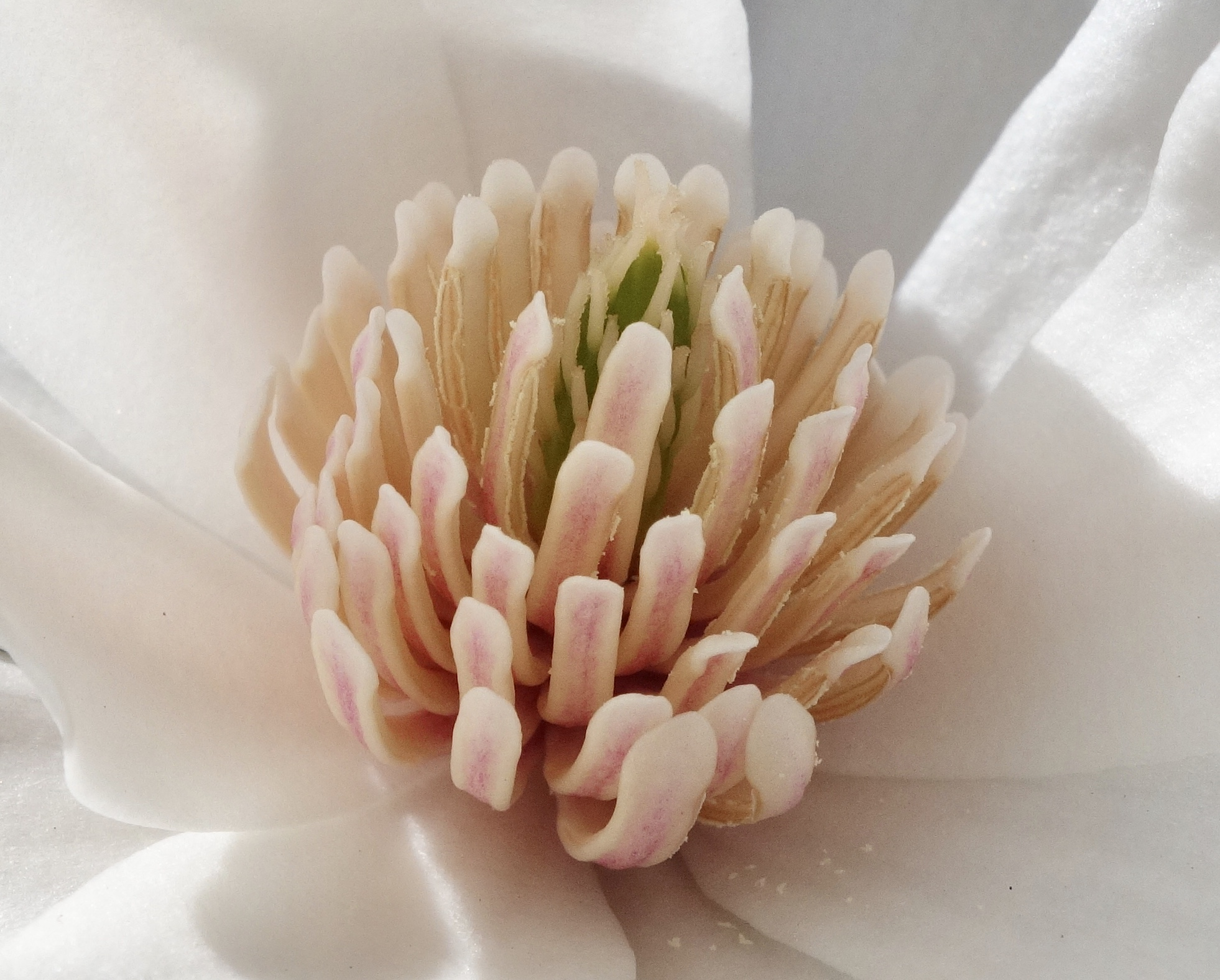
'Merrill' flower detail

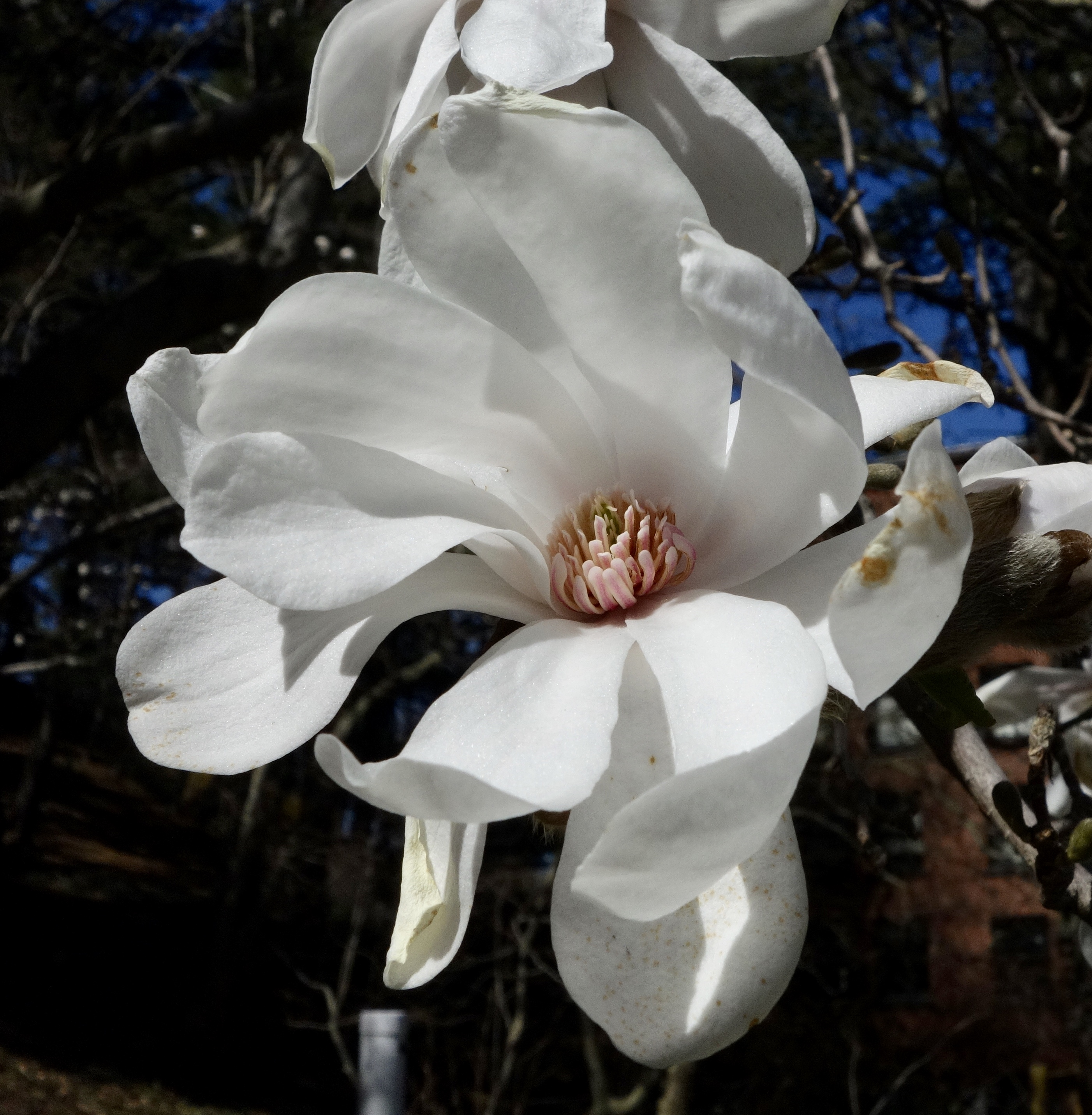
'Merrill' flower

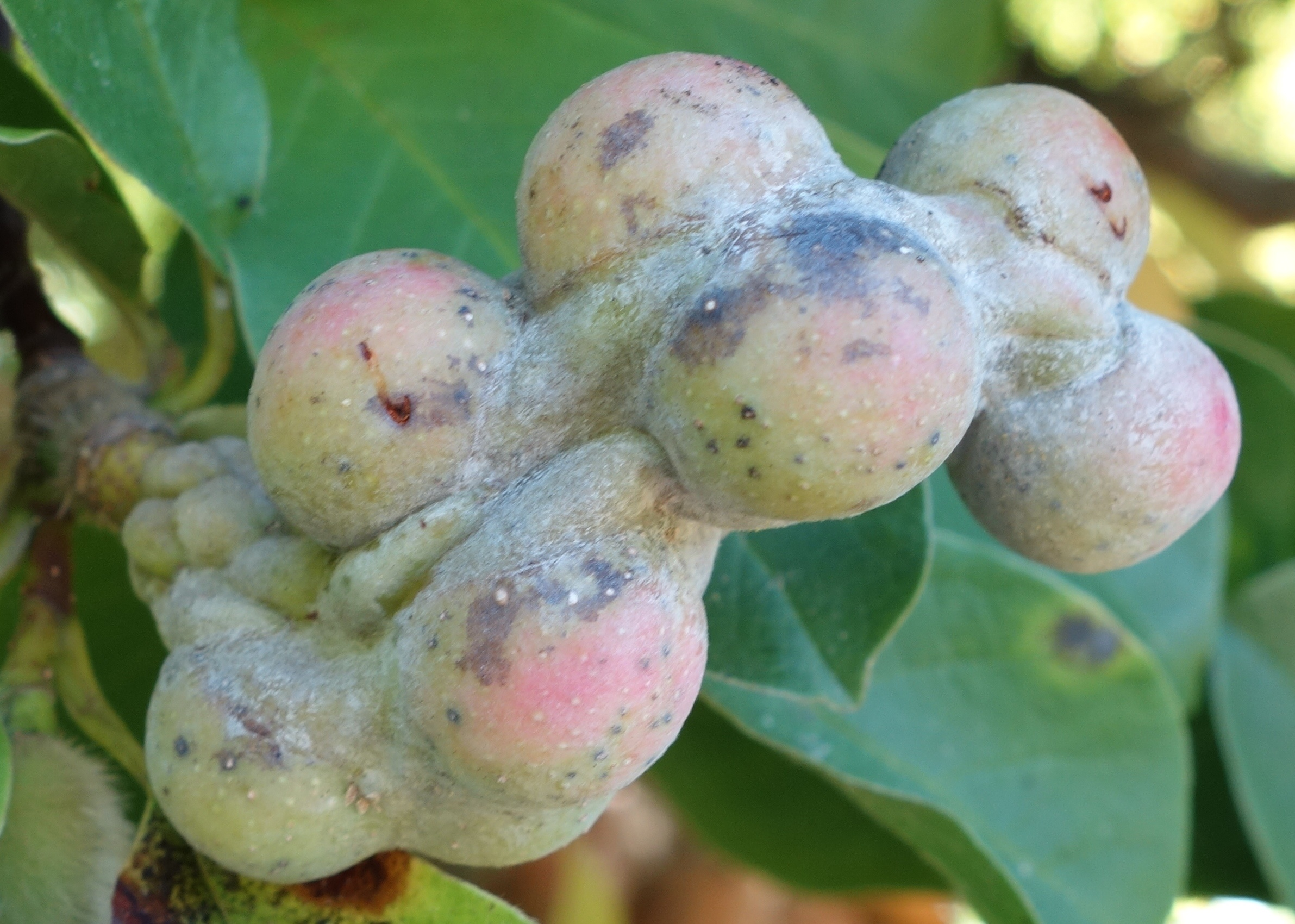
'Merrill' immature fruit
