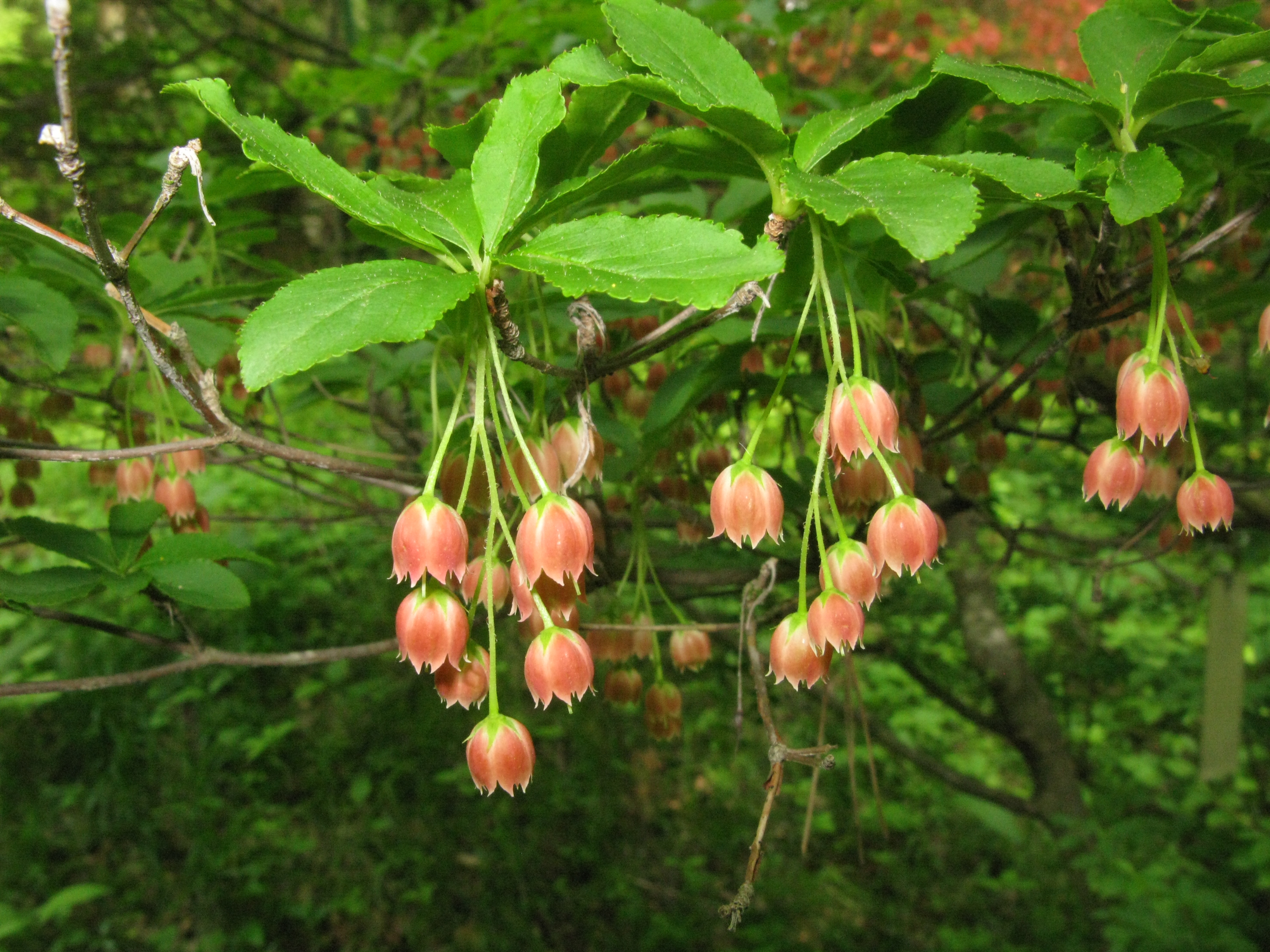
- E. cernuus f. rubens

Scientific classification
- Kingdom: Plantae
- Clade: Embryophytes
- Clade: Tracheophytes
- Clade: Angiosperms
- Clade: Eudicots
- Clade: Asterids
- Order: Ericales
- Family: Ericaceae
- Genus: Enkianthus
- Species: E. cernuus

Binomial name
- Enkianthus cernuus (Siebold & Zucc.) Benth. & Hook.f. ex Makino

Synonyms
- List: Andromeda cernua (Siebold & Zucc.) Miq.; Enkianthus meisteria Maxim.; Enkianthus nipponicus Palib.; Meisteria cernua Siebold & Zucc.; Tritomodon cernuus (Siebold & Zucc.) Honda; Tritomodon japonicus Turcz.

= Enkianthus cernuus =

Species of flowering plant

Enkianthus cernuus, the nodding enkianthus, is a species of flowering plant in the family Ericaceae, native to southern Japan. A shrub or small tree that prefers to grow in wet areas, Enkianthus cernuus f. rubens, the drooping red enkianthus, has gained the Royal Horticultural Society's Award of Garden Merit.
