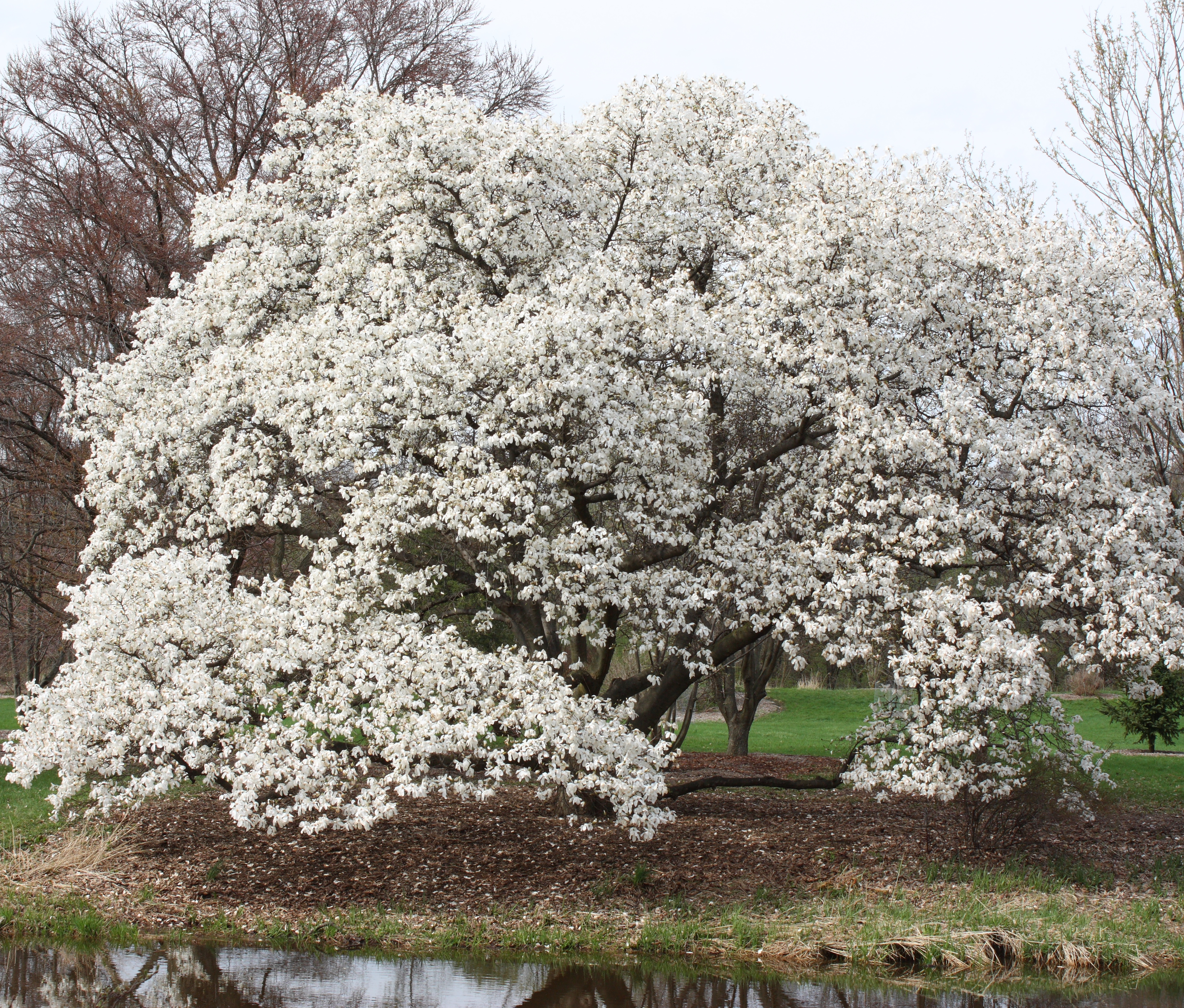
- Magnolia kobus var. borealis

Conservation status
- Data Deficient (IUCN 3.1)

Scientific classification
- Kingdom: Plantae
- Clade: Embryophytes
- Clade: Tracheophytes
- Clade: Spermatophytes
- Clade: Angiosperms
- Clade: Magnoliids
- Order: Magnoliales
- Family: Magnoliaceae
- Genus: Magnolia
- Subgenus: Magnolia subg. Yulania
- Section: Magnolia sect. Yulania
- Subsection: Magnolia subsect. Yulania
- Species: M. kobus

Binomial name
- Magnolia kobus DC.

Synonyms
- Buergeria obovata Siebold & Zucc.; Magnolia borealis (Sarg.) Kudô; Magnolia kobus var. borealis Sarg.; Magnolia kobus f. horisontalidivaricata V.V.Byalt & Firsov; Magnolia kobushii Mayr; Magnolia praecocossima Koidz.; Magnolia pseudokobus S.Abe & Akasawa; Magnolia thurberi G.Nicholson; Michelia gracilis Kostel.; Talauma obovata (Siebold & Zucc.) Benth. & Hook.f. ex Hance; Yulania kobus (DC.) Spach; Yulania pseudokobus (S.Abe & Akasawa) D.L.Fu

= Magnolia kobus =

Species of tree

Magnolia kobus, known as mokryeon, kobus magnolia, or kobushi magnolia, is a species of Magnolia native to Japan (Kyushu, Honshu, and Hokkaido) and Korea and occasionally cultivated in temperate areas. It is a deciduous, small to tall tree which has a slow rate of growth but can reach 8–15 m (25–50 ft) in height and up to 10 m (35 ft) in spread.

== Classification ==
Two varieties of Magnolia kobus are recognized by some sources, such as Hortus Third, with var. borealis being a tree to 25 m (75 ft) high, with leaves to 15 cm (6 in) long, and var. kobus, a tree to 10 m (30 ft) high, with leaves to 10 cm (4 in) long.

Magnolia kobus is classified within Magnolia subgenus Yulania.

The kobus magnolia is closely related to the star magnolia (Magnolia stellata), and some authorities consider the star magnolia to be a variety of M. kobus, M. kobus var. stellata.

== Description ==
Magnolia kobus blooms in the early spring, bearing pleasantly fragrant white flowers with hints of pale pink about 10 cm (4 in) in diameter. The flowers are produced before the leaves, as with most members of Magnolia subgenus Yulania. Young trees do not flower.

The summer foliage of the kobus magnolia is dark green. Leaves have an obovate shape with a pointed tip, a smooth, or glabrous, leaf underside, and smooth, even edges. Leaves are 8–15 cm (3–6 in) long, in an alternating arrangement. In autumn, the leaves take on a yellow color and drop from the tree.

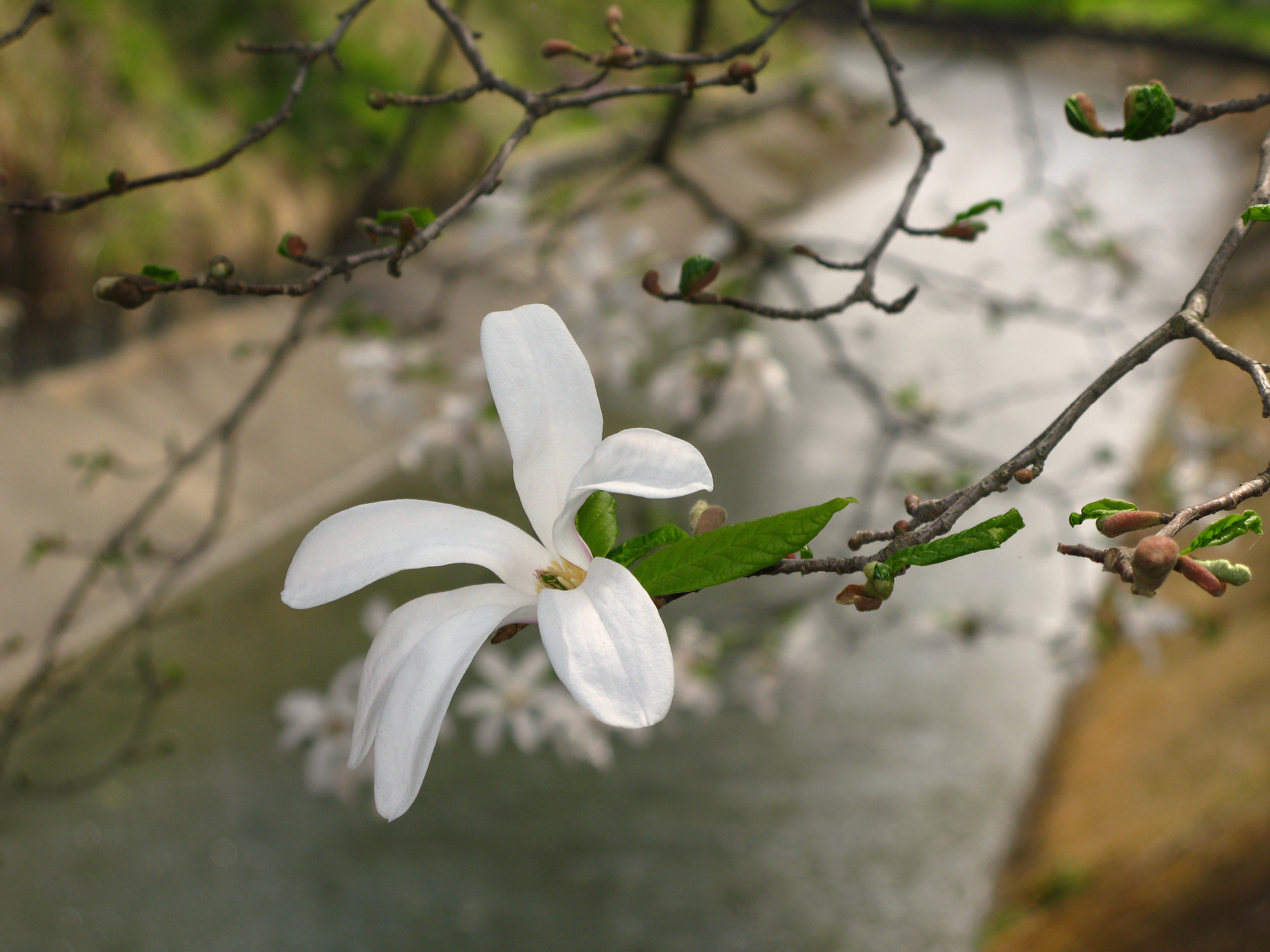
Magnolia kobus in flower, with a singular blossom in the foreground eclipsing an array of blossoms in the midground, over the backdrop of a waterway. Photographed in the Kantō region of Japan

The fruit of the kobus magnolia grows in groups of small red seeds. The groupings are one to three inches in size, and the seeds attract birds.

Older bark, such as that of the trunk, is grey-brown, while new stems are green with small brown spots. There is a strong odor to broken branches or twigs.

Several news outlets reported that in November 1982, seeds estimated to be 2,000 years old was found by a Hiroshi Utsunomiya of Yamaguchi University in a pit in the ancient Bronze Age village of Asada. He planted a number of seeds, assuming that they would not grow. However, this assumption was proven incorrect. Interestingly, the flowers of the grown plant had 7 or 8 petals on its blossoms rather than the six petals typical of a kobus magnolia.

== Gallery ==
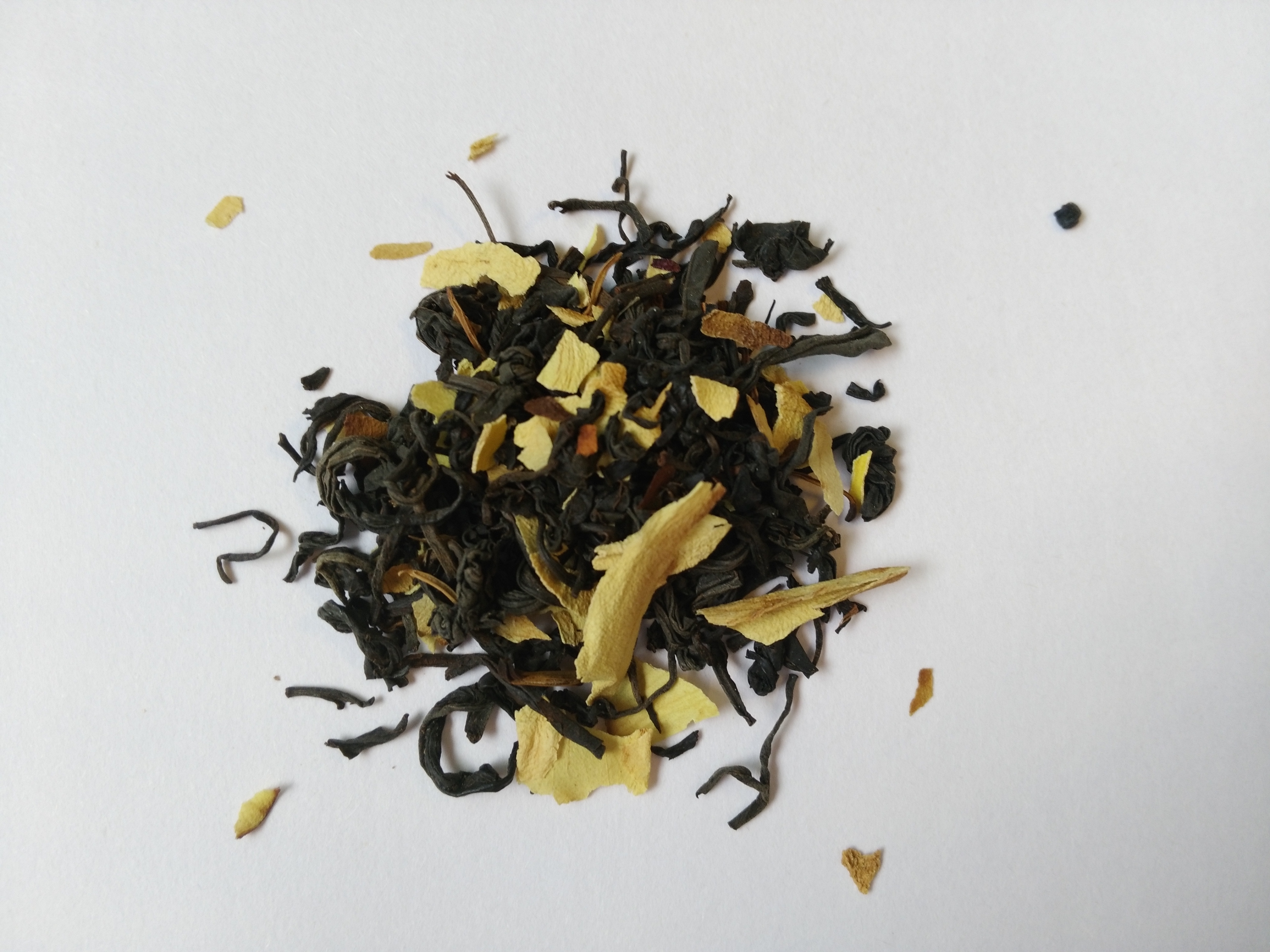
Jaekseol tea blended with magnolia petals

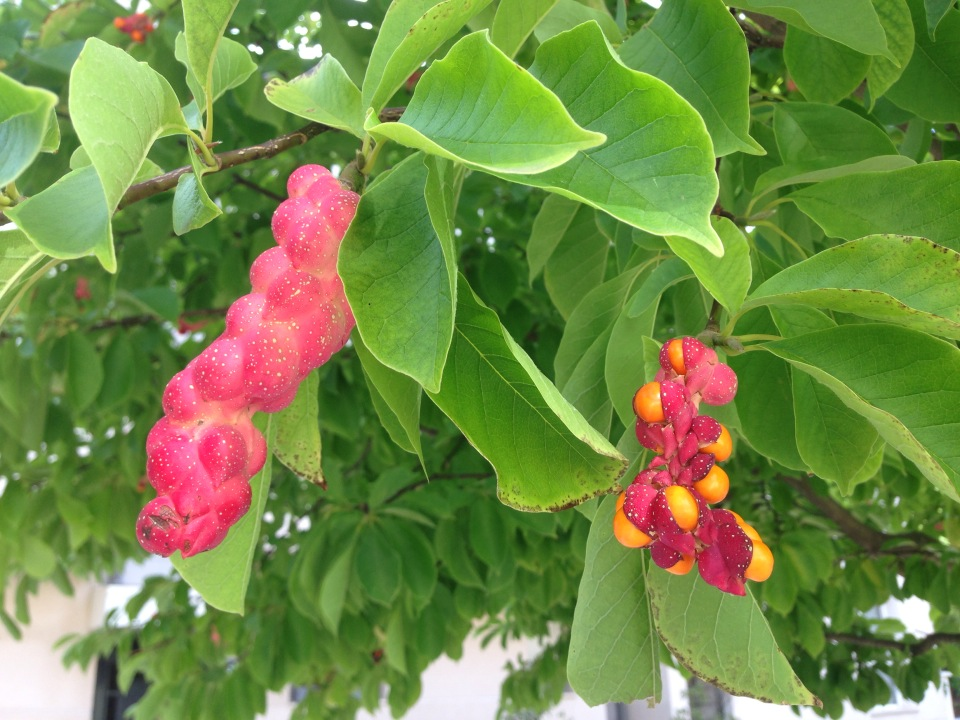
Fruit

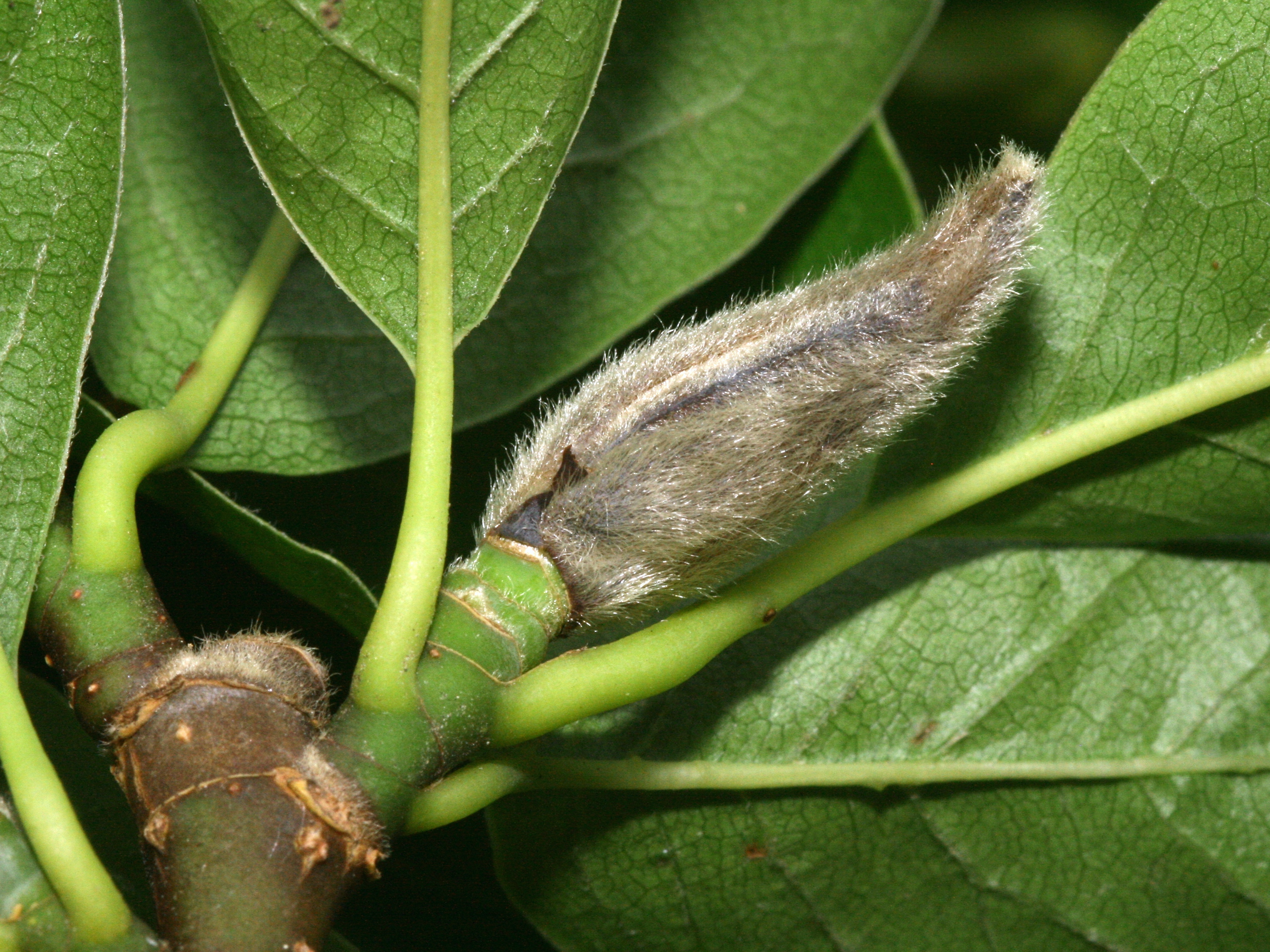
Autumn buds

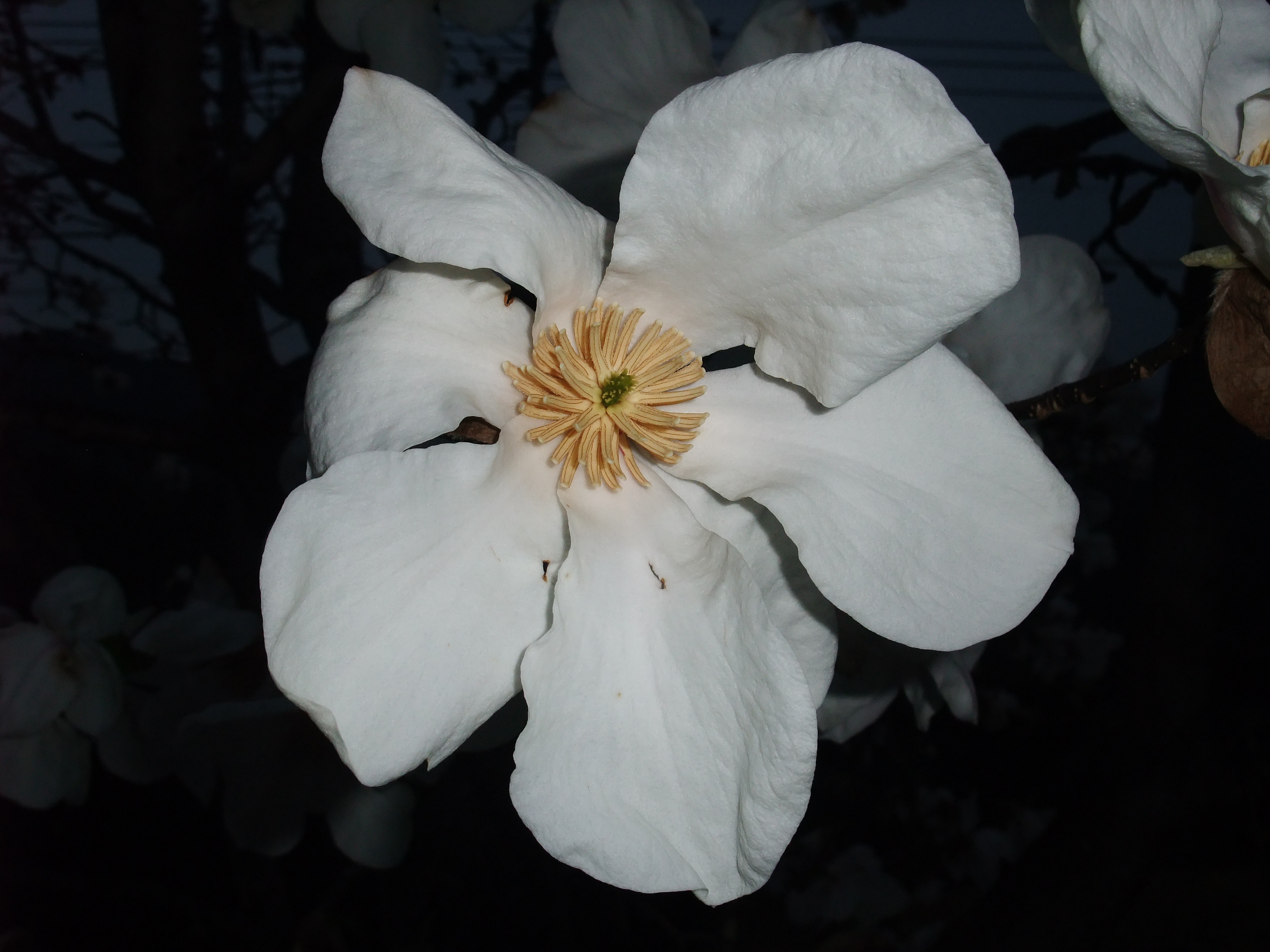
Flowers

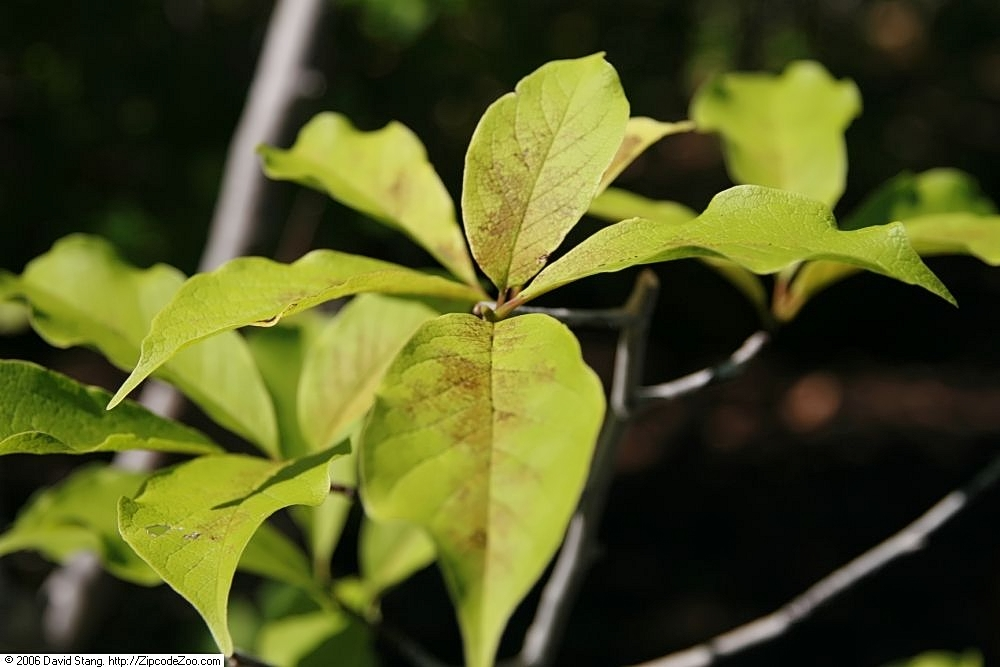
Leaves
