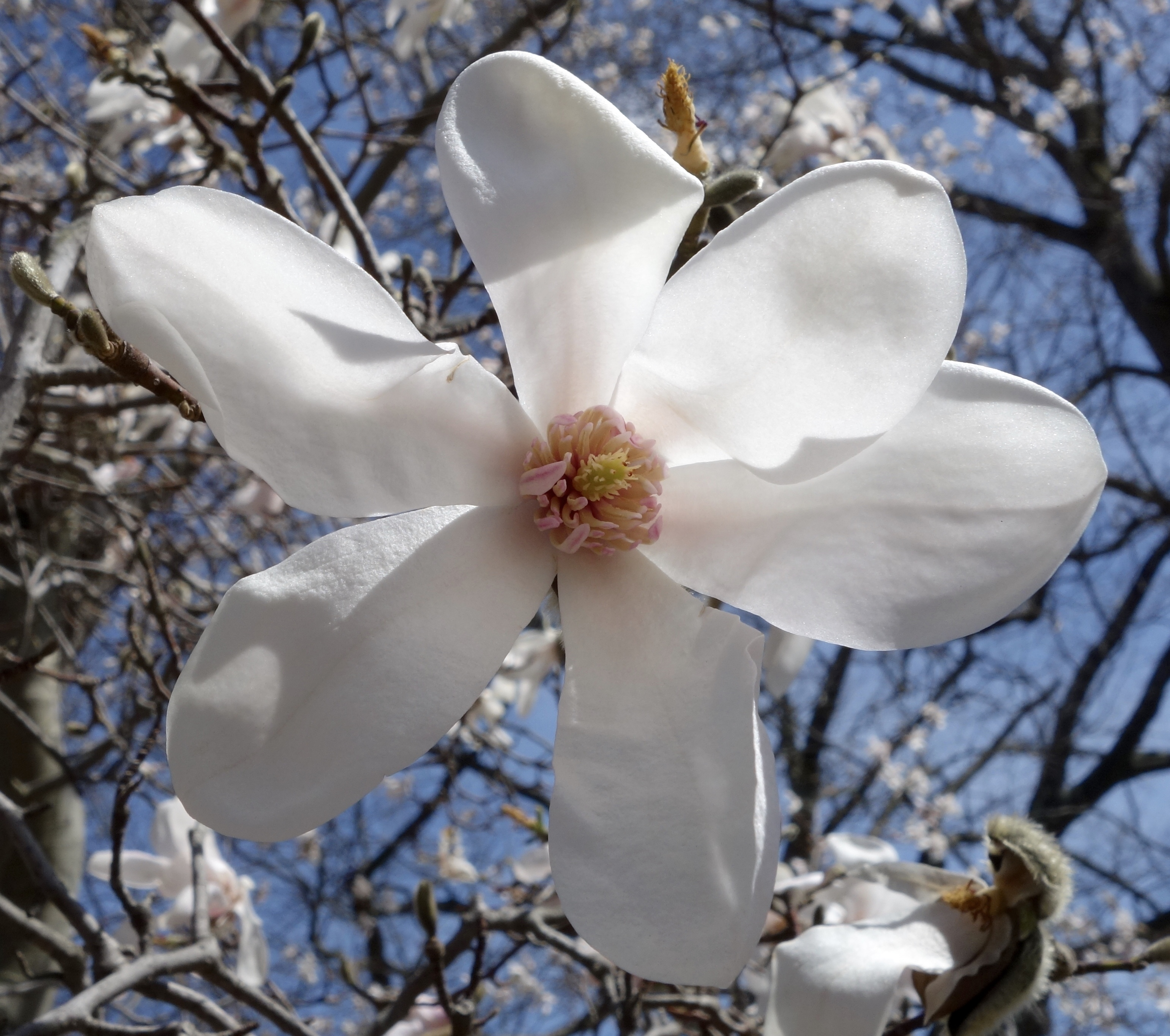
- Magnolia salicifolia Arnold Arboretum of Harvard University accession #1004-61*A

Conservation status
- Least Concern (IUCN 3.1)

Scientific classification
- Kingdom: Plantae
- Clade: Embryophytes
- Clade: Tracheophytes
- Clade: Spermatophytes
- Clade: Angiosperms
- Clade: Magnoliids
- Order: Magnoliales
- Family: Magnoliaceae
- Genus: Magnolia
- Subgenus: Magnolia subg. Yulania
- Section: Magnolia sect. Yulania
- Subsection: Magnolia subsect. Yulania
- Species: M. salicifolia

Binomial name
- Magnolia salicifolia Maxim.

= Magnolia salicifolia =

Species of tree

Magnolia salicifolia, also known as willow-leafed magnolia or anise magnolia, is a species of tree native to Japan. It is a small deciduous tree 7.5 m (25 ft) tall, with narrow lanceolate leaves with whitened undersides. The leaves are not as narrow as true willows (Salix), but are narrow compared to other magnolias, giving this tree a finer texture. The 10 cm-wide scented flowers emerge in early spring before the leaves. Flowers have six petals. The leaves and bark are fragrant when crushed. It grows in rocky, granite soil along stream banks.

The cultivar 'Wada's Memory', with double white scented flowers, has gained the Royal Horticultural Society's Award of Garden Merit.

== Gallery ==
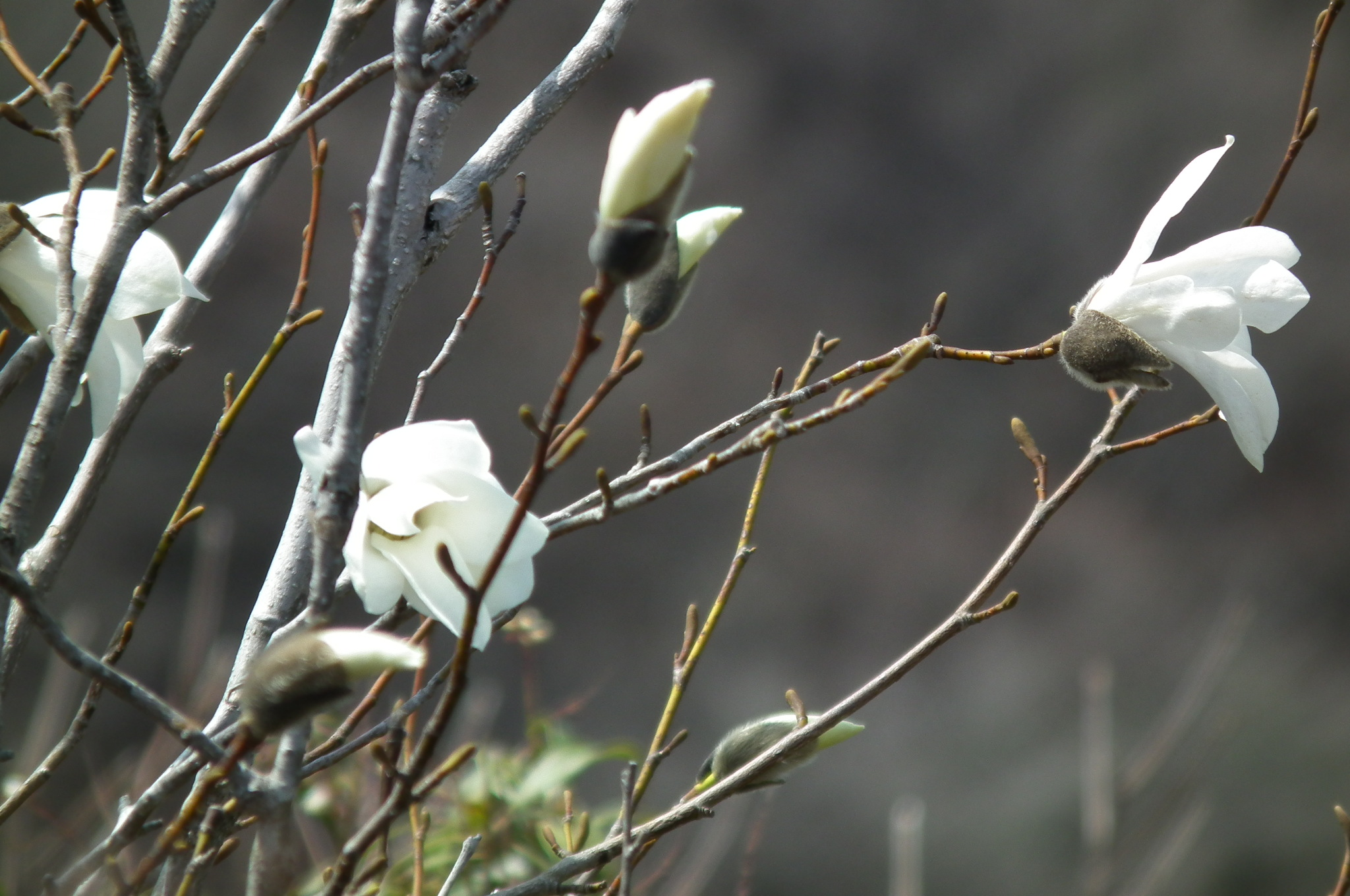
Magnolia salicifolia

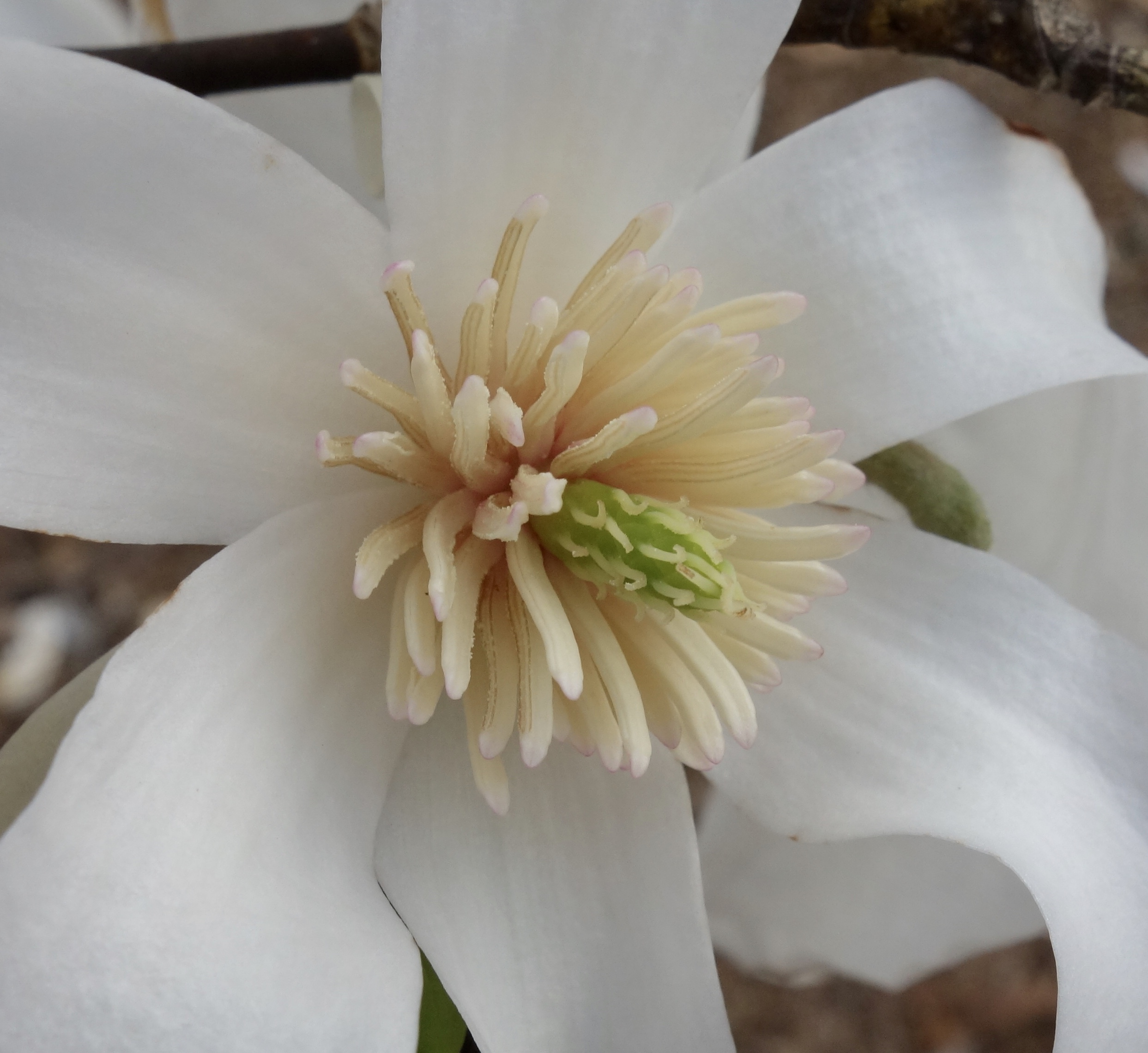
Flower detail

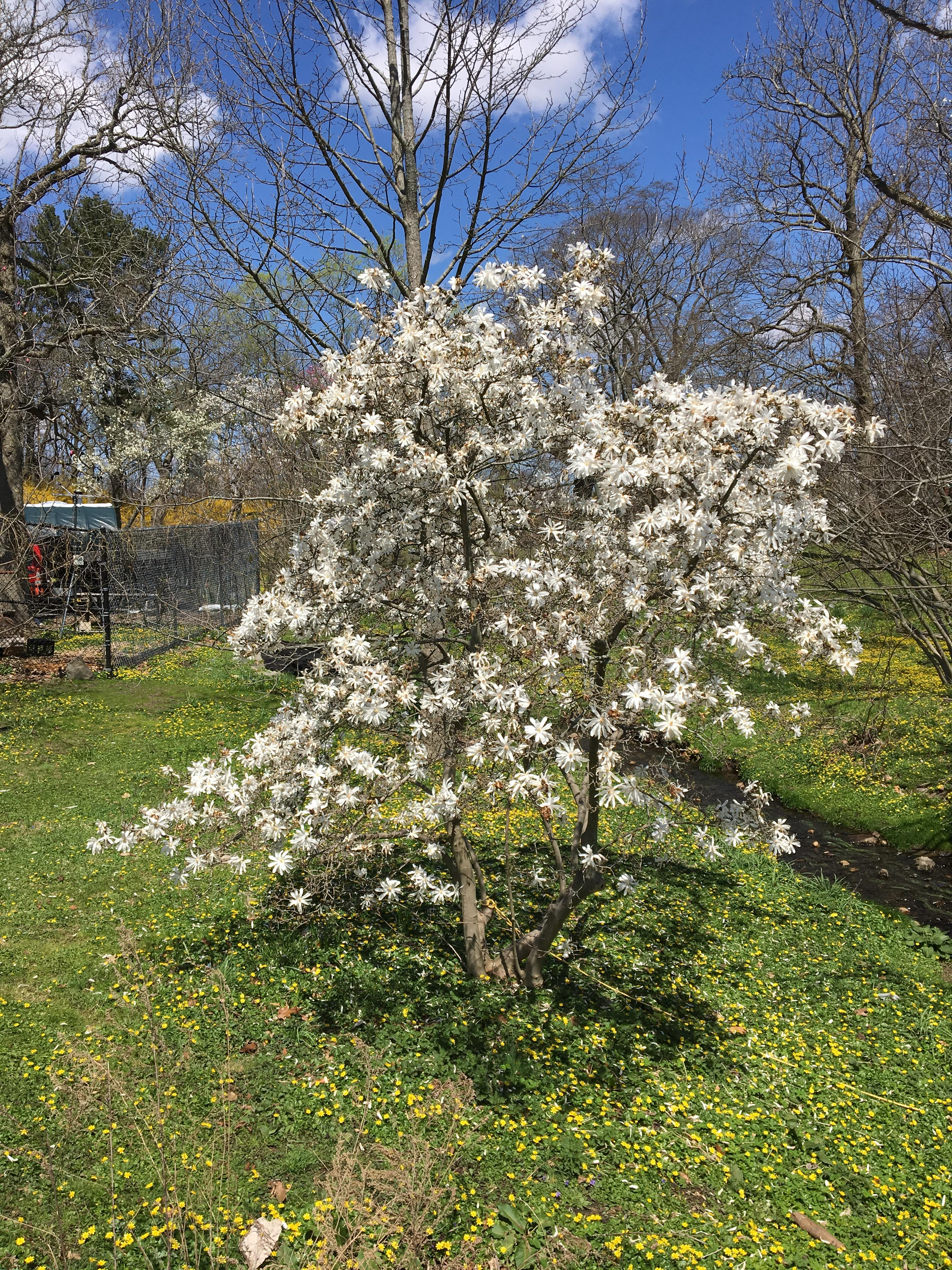
Magnolia salicifolia, Arnold Arboretum of Harvard University, accession #51-63*A.

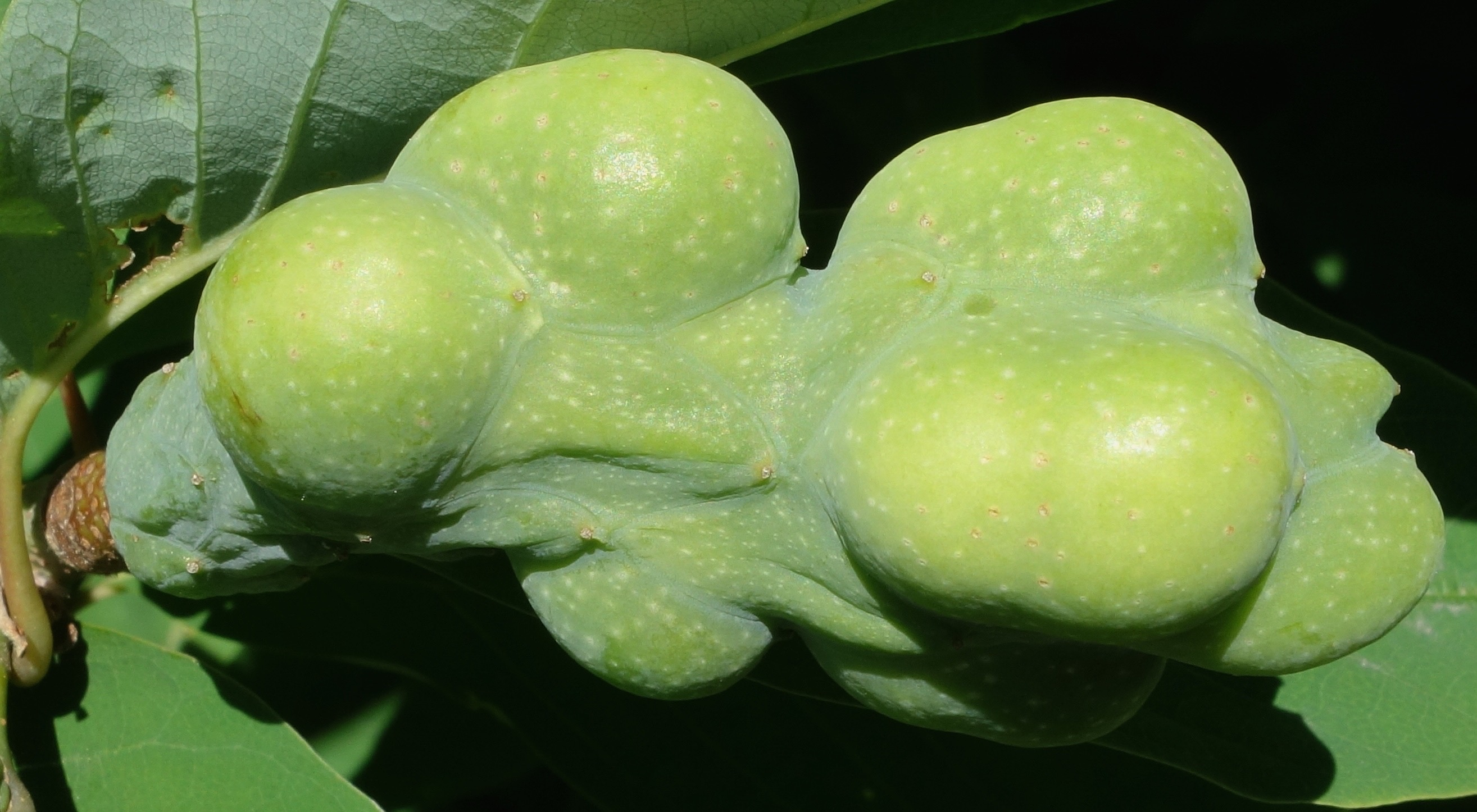
Immature fruit
