= Józef Bem Street =

Street in Racibórz, Poland

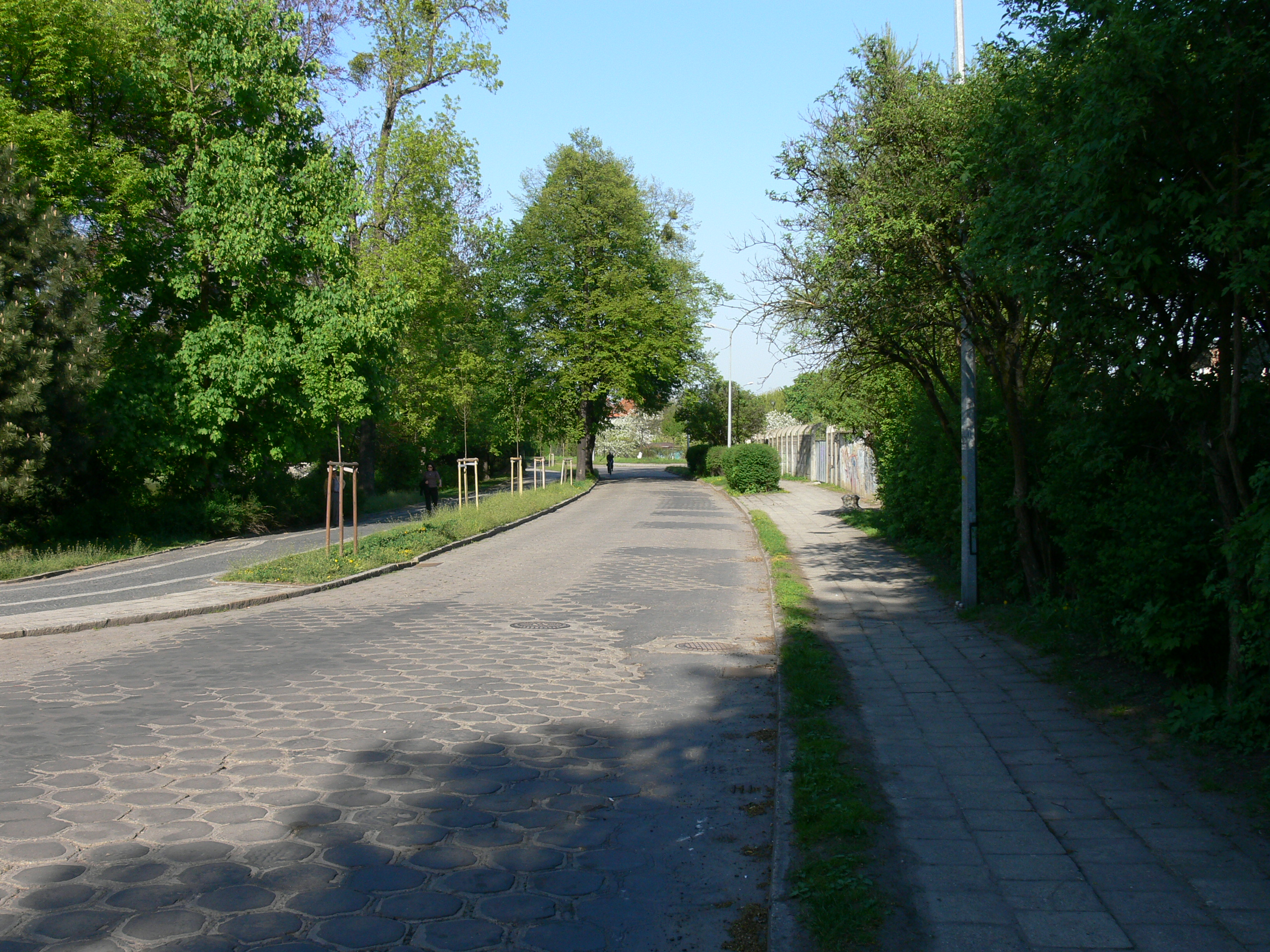
- View of Józef Bem Street
- Former name(s): Augustastraße
- Part of: Nowe Zagrody
- Length: 532 m (1,745 ft)
- Location: Racibórz, Poland
- Coordinates: 50°05′04.9″N 18°13′03.0″E

General Józef Bem Street (formerly German: Augustastraße) is a street in the Nowe Zagrody district of Racibórz, Poland. It begins at the intersection with Stanisław Staszic Street and Henryk Sienkiewicz Street and ends at the intersection with Waryński Street and Eichendorff Street. The street is named after General Józef Bem. It features several tenement houses and residential buildings, the former municipal hospital, City of Roth Park, and Kindergarten No. 12.

== Notable buildings ==
=== Former municipal hospital ===
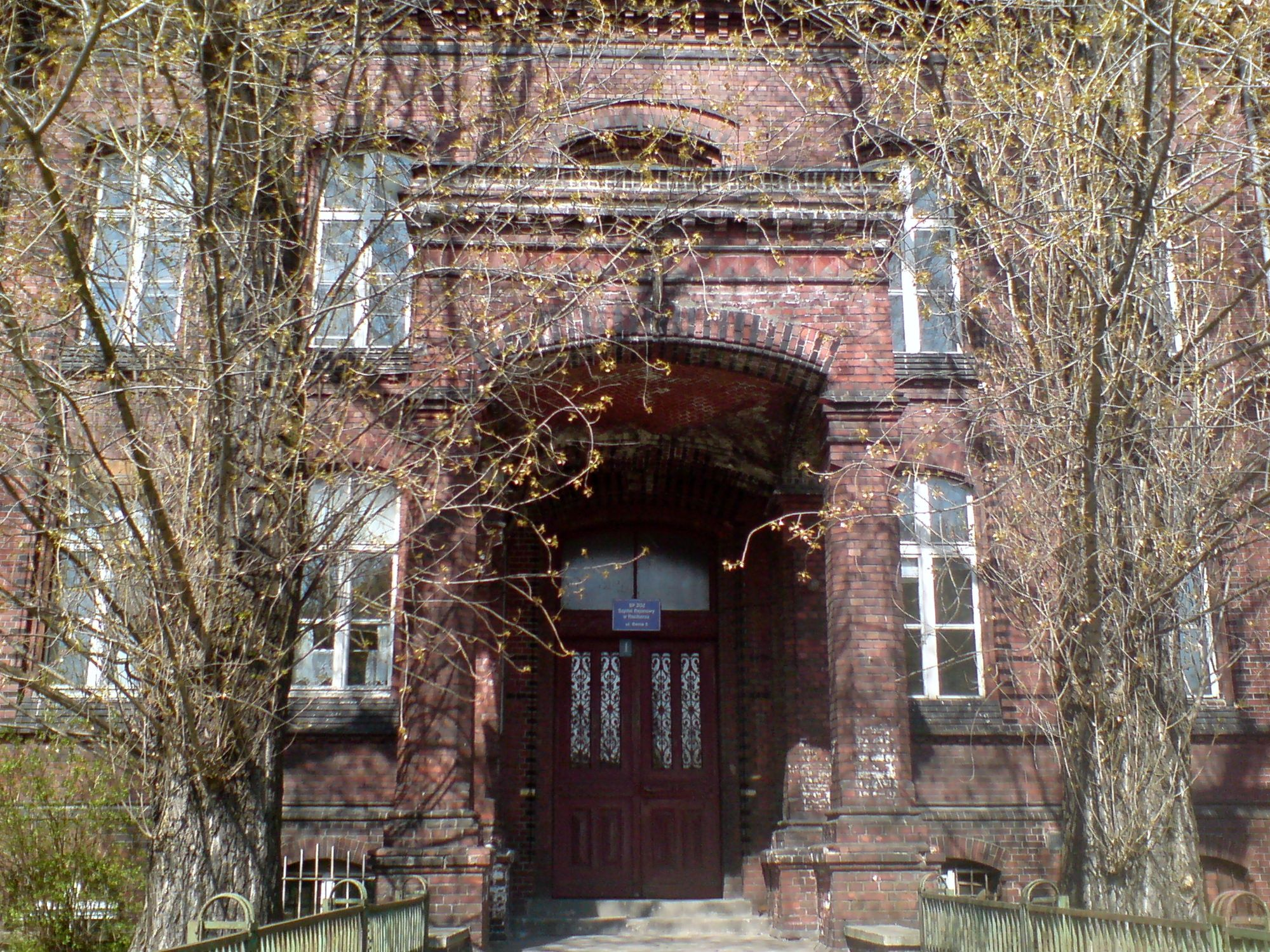
Entrance to the former municipal hospital at 5 Józef Bem Street

The former municipal hospital at 5 Józef Bem Street comprises four sections. Built in the Gothic Revival style, the central section was constructed between 1895 and 1897. The southern and northern wings were added in 1902, and a wing adjacent to what is now City of Roth Park (formerly a Catholic-Protestant cemetery) was built between 1908 and 1910. The complex consists of a rectangular main building connected to perpendicular wings, with a pavilion extending the southern wing on an irregular plan. The three-story red brick structure features simple decorative elements and avant-corps with triangular gables in the central section. The hospital's chapel contains stained glass windows depicting Saint Veronica, Saint Philomena, Saint John Nepomuk, and Francis de Sales. Saucer magnolias planted in the 19th century grow at the entrance from Józef Bem Street. On 28 September 2010, the building was sold to private investors for commercial purposes.

=== Former municipal swimming pool ===
The former municipal swimming pool, adjacent to Józef Bem Street, was an open-air bathing facility opened in 1925 and used until the 1997 flood. It included two open pools, one for men and one for women, each covering 1,800 m² with depths ranging from 0.8 to 2.5 meters, and up to 3 meters near multi-level diving boards and springboards. The facility hosted swimming events during the First Upper Silesian Olympics in September 1925. After the flood, the site deteriorated, and despite proposals for reconstruction, it is now being redeveloped into a residential estate.

=== Residential buildings ===
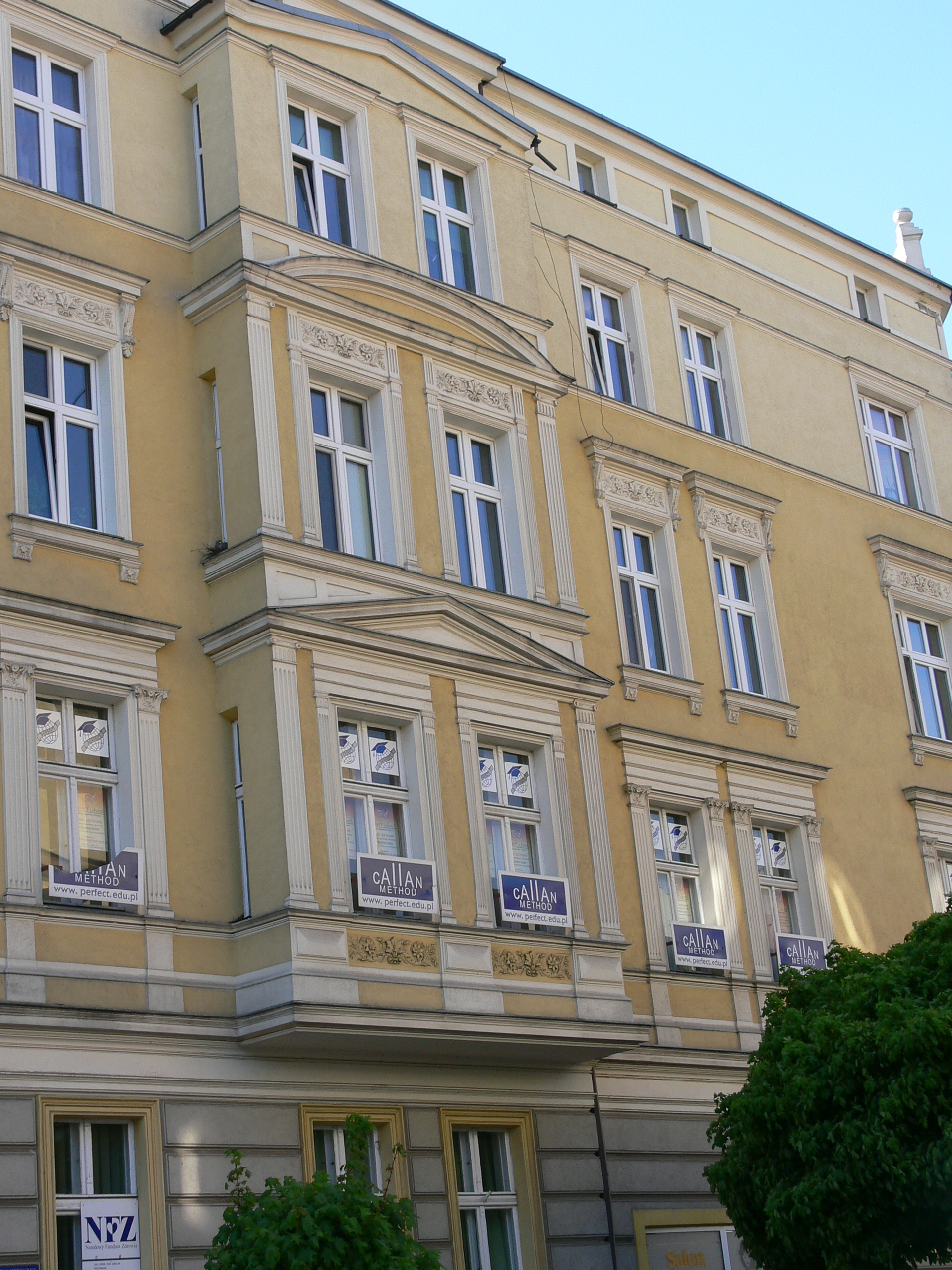
Bay window in the tenement at 1 Józef Bem Street

- Tenement at 1 Józef Bem Street – Constructed in 1913 in the eclectic style with Renaissance Revival elements, this corner residential-commercial tenement was built on a polygonal plan with a chamfered corner. The four-story building retains architectural details, featuring a two-axis bay window at the entrance and another at the corner. The bay window openings are designed as aediculae with finials in Renaissance attics.
- Tenement at 17 Staszic Street (corner of Bem Street) – This late 19th-century eclectic corner building formerly housed a restaurant on the ground floor. Now used for commercial and residential purposes, it features a symmetrical facade with semicircular, profiled arches over ground-floor windows and doorways. The front facade includes two balconies with cast-iron, openwork balustrades displaying Art Nouveau features.
- Twin Villa at 10/12 Józef Bem Street – Built in the modernist style, this five-story villa has five-axis floors and a high, four-pitched roof.
- Villa at 14 Józef Bem Street – Constructed in the 1930s in the modernist style, this two-story villa features a gabled roof.

== Nature ==
At the entrance to the former municipal hospital, magnolias planted in the 19th century grow. The hospital garden contains a row of eight London plane trees, recognized as natural monuments, with trunk circumferences of 425 cm, 389 cm, 421 cm, 450 cm, 410 cm, 485 cm, 385 cm, and 385 cm, estimated to be 190–200 years old, located on plot 2917/180. Four additional natural monuments are located in the adjacent City of Roth Park, including an approximately 80–90-year-old bald-cypress near the pond with a trunk circumference of 220 cm.

== Tourism ==
Józef Bem Street is part of the red Polish Hussars Trail, which runs from Będzin to Krzanowice. Sights for tourists include the late 19th-century Gothic Revival former municipal hospital, eclectic tenements at the Staszic Street intersection, and City of Roth Park with its pond, natural monuments, and remnants of a former cemetery and World War I memorial.

== Public facilities ==
=== Kindergarten No. 12 ===
Kindergarten No. 12, located at 6 Józef Bem Street, is a public facility operated by the Racibórz City Council and supervised by the Katowice Education Authority. It serves children aged 3 to 6 in three groups. The building, originally the residence of city medical councilor Dr. Waldemar Orzechowski, was designed on a square plan with a four-pitched roof and modernist features. The courtyard features a semicircular avant-corps with a first-floor terrace. Two preserved stained glass windows depict a musical motif (lyre) and a medical motif (Rod of Asclepius).

=== City of Roth Park ===
City of Roth Park, also known as the "Swan Park" (German: Eichendorffpark), was designed in 1920 by Sußmann. The park includes a pond covering approximately 10,000 m² with a wooded island. It features a network of walking paths and a fenced children's playground but lacks lighting. The pond is fed by an artificial stream and a fountain with three nozzles spraying water up to 12 meters high. West of the pond are remnants of a 1926 World War I memorial, including side balustrades with benches.

== Map ==
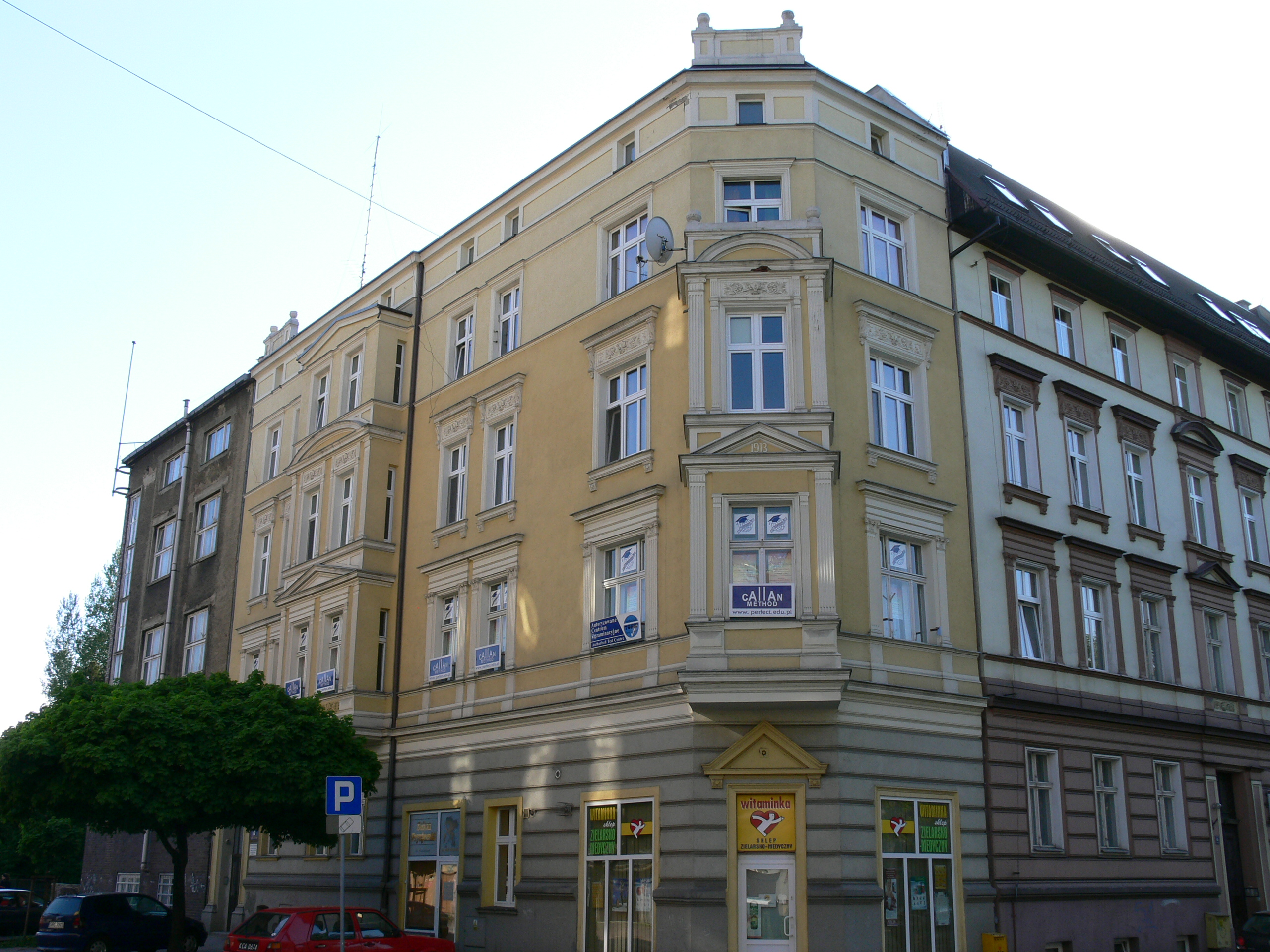
1. Tenement at 1 Józef Bem Street

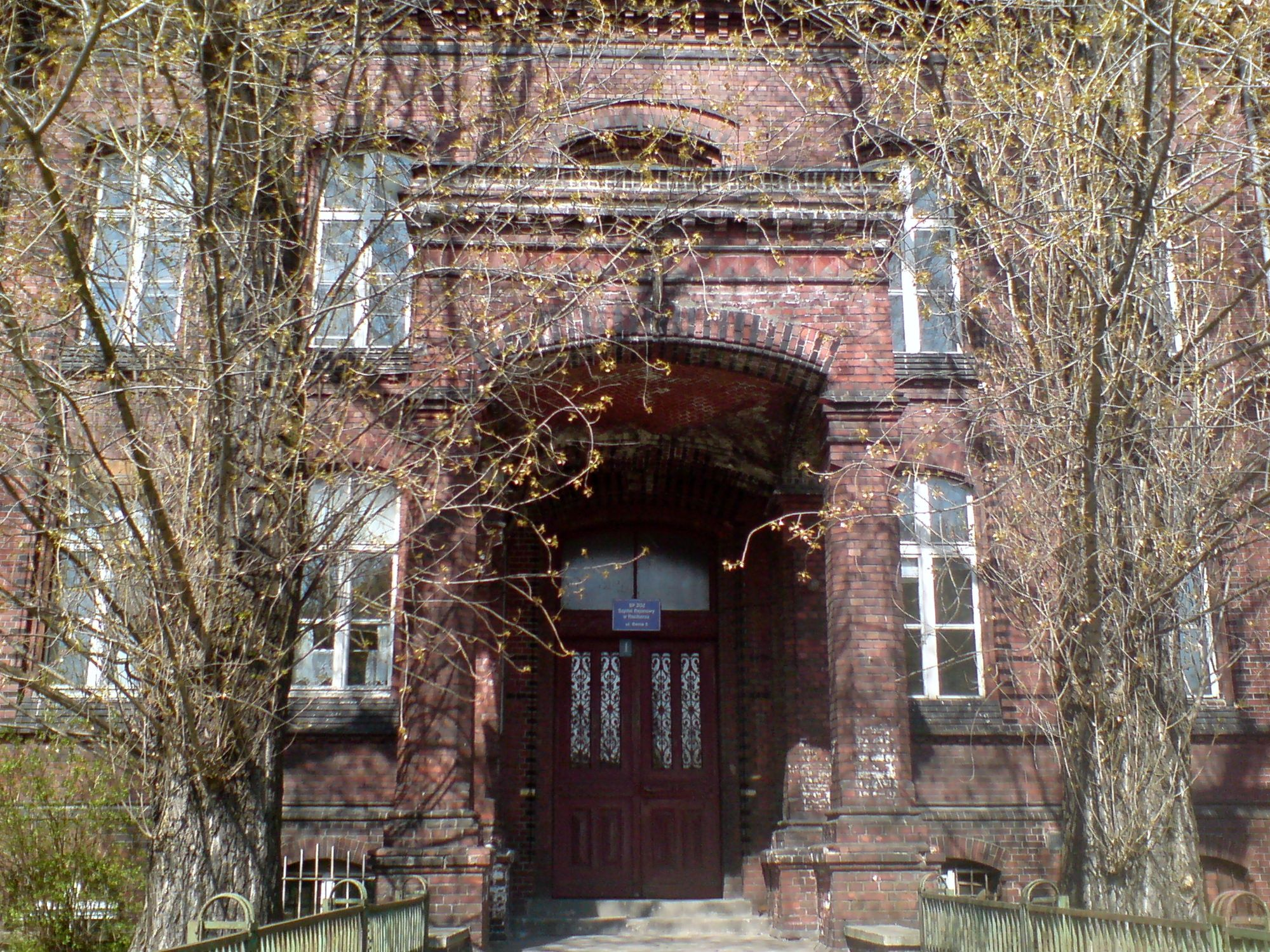
2. Former municipal hospital at 5 Józef Bem Street

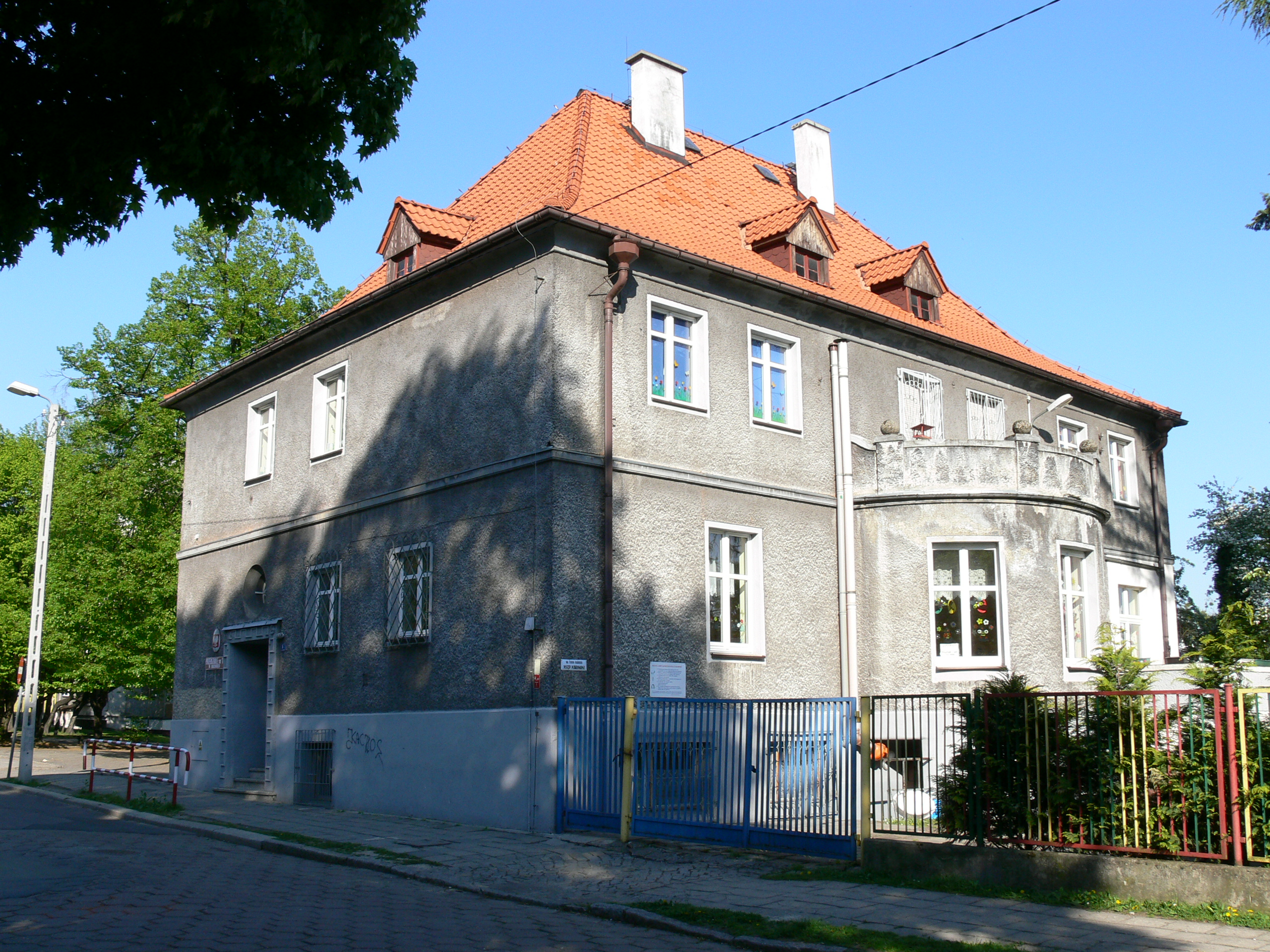
3. Kindergarten No. 12 at 6 Józef Bem Street

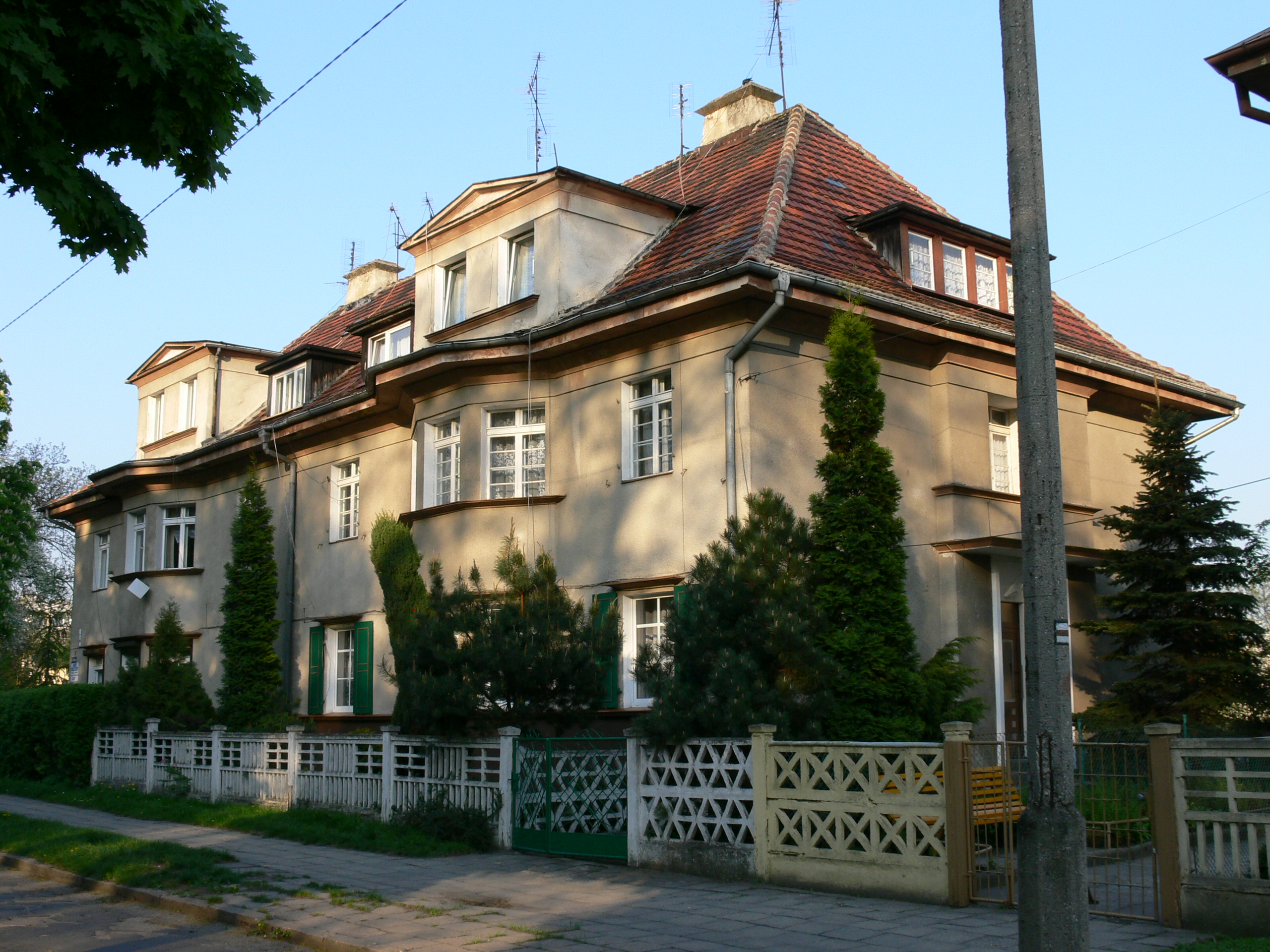
4. Twin Villa at 10/12 Józef Bem Street

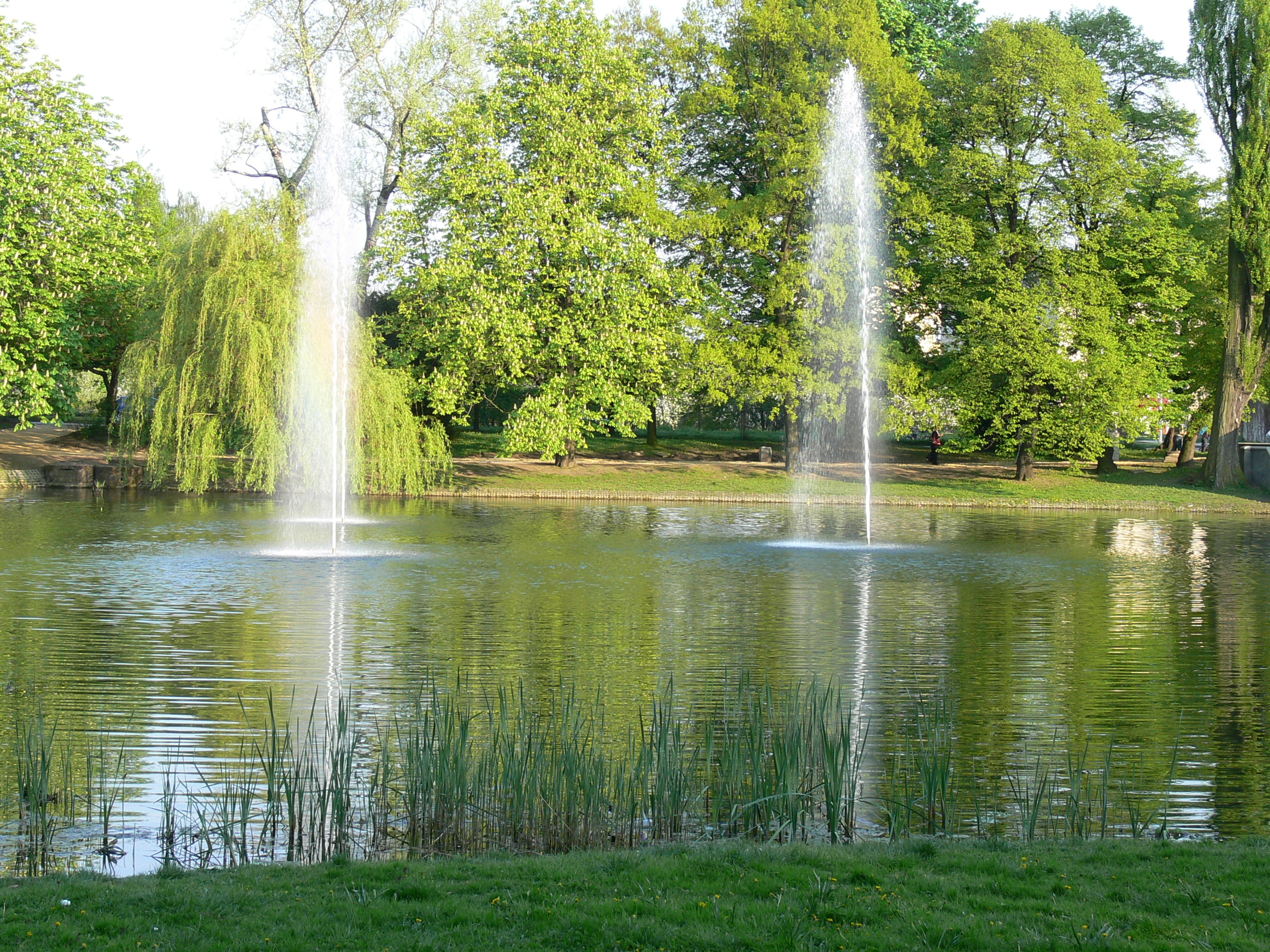
5. City of Roth Park

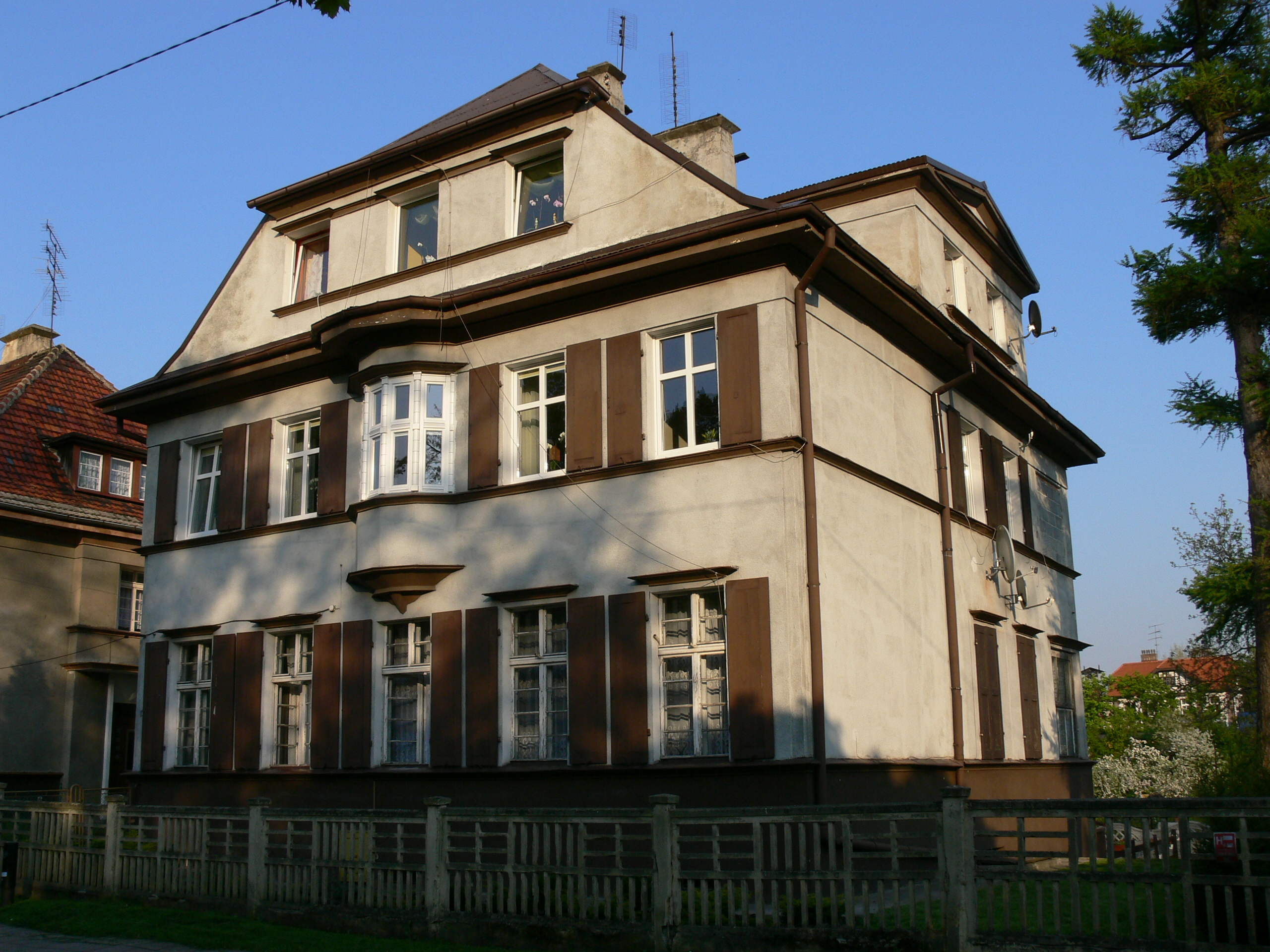
6. Villa at 14 Józef Bem Street

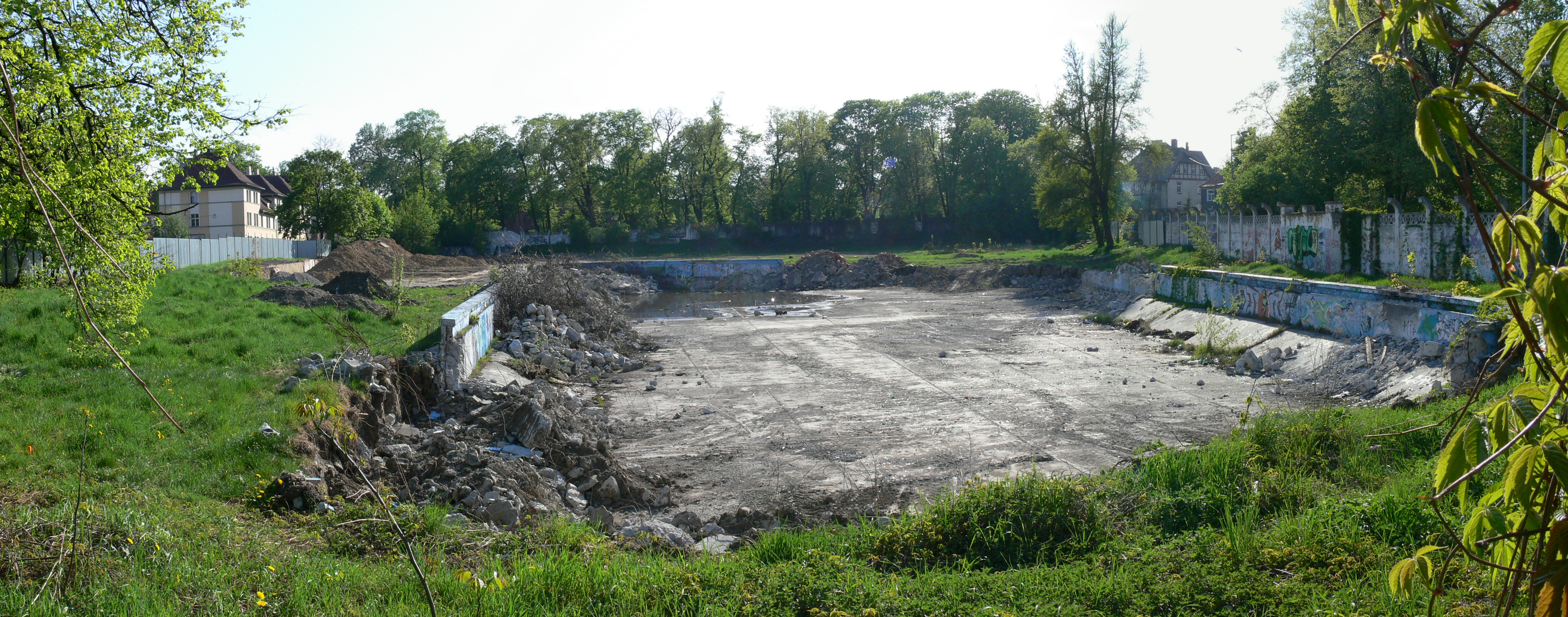
7. Former municipal swimming pool

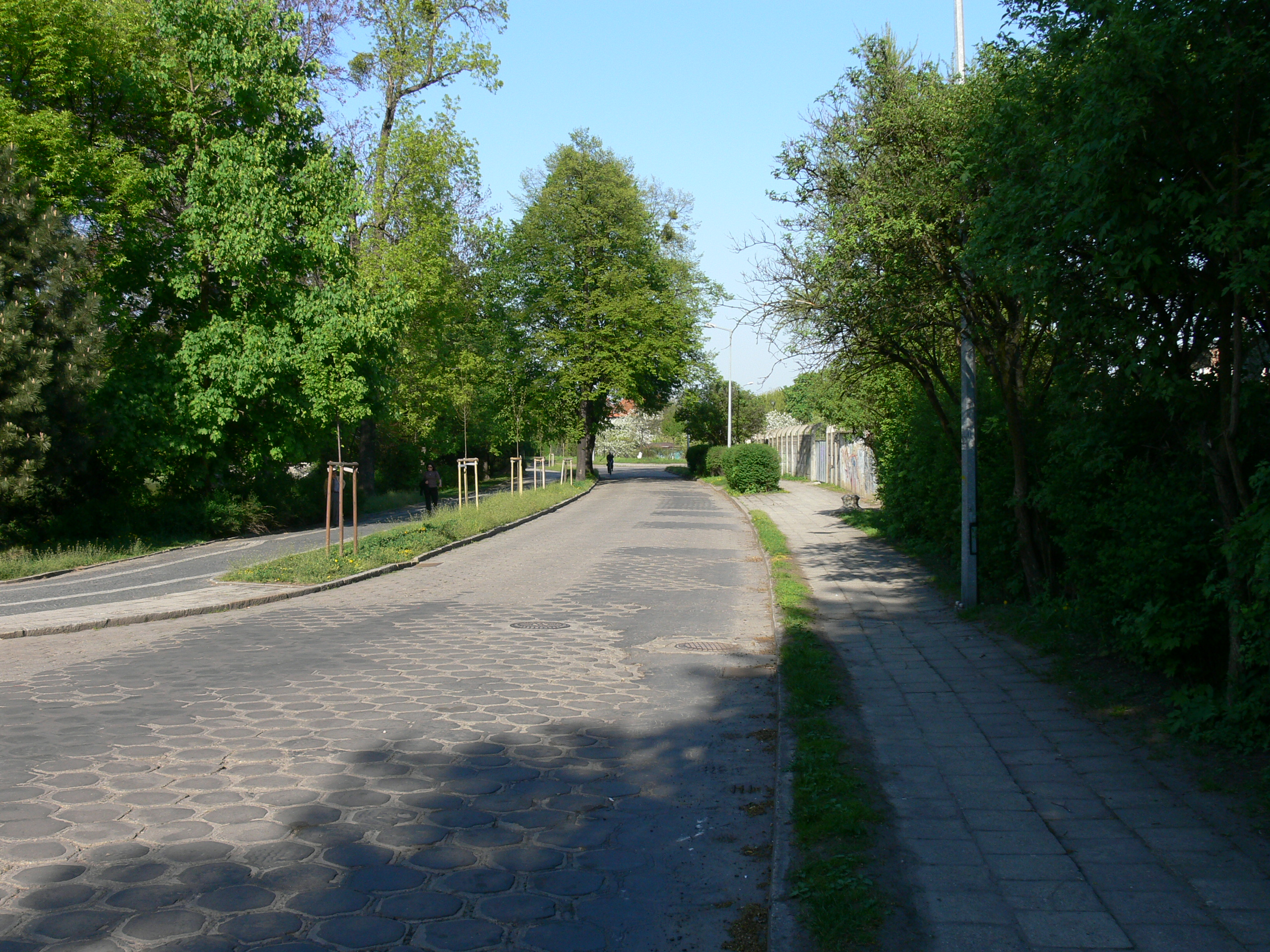
8. View of General Józef Bem Street

== Bibliography ==
- Newerla, Paweł (2008). Dzieje Raciborza i jego dzielnic [History of Racibórz and Its Districts] (in Polish). Racibórz: WAW. ISBN 978-83-89802-73-6.
