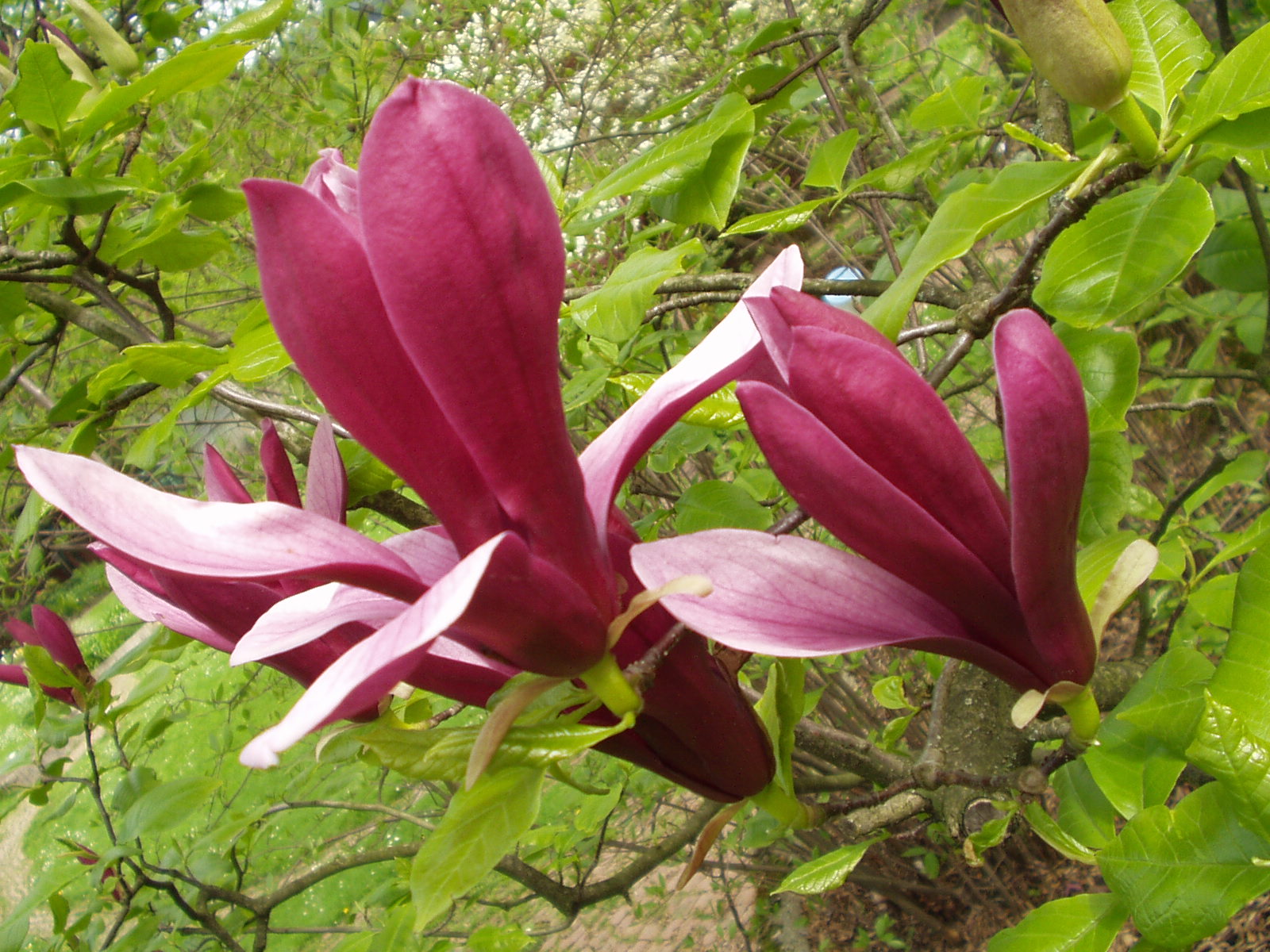

Conservation status
- Data Deficient (IUCN 3.1)

Scientific classification
- Kingdom: Plantae
- Clade: Embryophytes
- Clade: Tracheophytes
- Clade: Spermatophytes
- Clade: Angiosperms
- Clade: Magnoliids
- Order: Magnoliales
- Family: Magnoliaceae
- Genus: Magnolia
- Subgenus: Magnolia subg. Yulania
- Section: Magnolia sect. Yulania
- Subsection: Magnolia subsect. Yulania
- Species: M. liliiflora

Binomial name
- Magnolia liliiflora Desr.

Synonyms
- Synonymy: Lassonia quinquepeta Buc'hoz; Magnolia atropurpurea Steud.; Magnolia denudata var. purpurea (Curtis) C.K.Schneid.; Magnolia discolor Vent.; Magnolia gracilis Salisb.; Magnolia liliiflora var. gracilis (Salisb.) Rehder; Magnolia liliiflora var. nigra (G.Nicholson) Rehder; Magnolia liliiflora f. nigra (G.Nicholson) Geerinck; Magnolia obovata var. discolor (Vent.) DC.; Magnolia obovata var. purpurea (Curtis) Ser.; Magnolia obovata var. liliiflora (Desr.) DC.; Magnolia plena C.L.Peng & L.H.Yan; Magnolia polytepala Y.W.Law, R.Z.Zhou & R.J.Zhang; Magnolia purpurea Curtis; Magnolia purpurea var. discolor (Vent.) Loudon; Magnolia purpurea var. liliiflora (Desr.) Loudon; Magnolia quinquepeta (Buc'hoz) Dandy; Talauma sieboldii Miq.; Magnolia × soulangeana var. nigra G.Nicholson; Talauma sieboldii Miq.; Yulania japonica Spach; Yulania japonica var. purpurea (Curtis) P.Parm.; Yulania liliiflora (Desr.) D.L.Fu

= Magnolia liliiflora =

Species of tree

Magnolia liliiflora is a shrub or small tree native to southern China (including Sichuan and Yunnan), but cultivated for centuries elsewhere in China and also Japan. Variously known by many names, including Mulan magnolia, purple magnolia, red magnolia, lily magnolia, tulip magnolia and woody-orchid, it was first introduced to English-speaking countries from cultivated Japanese origins, and is thus also sometimes called Japanese magnolia, though it is not native to Japan. It is now also planted as an ornamental in North America and Europe, though rather less often than its popular hybrid (see below).

It is a deciduous shrub, exceptionally a small tree, to 4m tall (smaller than most other magnolias), and blooms profusely in early spring with large pink to purple showy flowers, before the leaf buds open. It is one of the slowest-growing trees, with a growth rate of 15 - 30 centimeters (6–12 in) when young.

The cultivar 'Nigra', with flowers much deeper in colour than the species, has gained the Royal Horticultural Society's Award of Garden Merit. It prefers an acid or neutral soil, in full sun or light shade.

This species is one of the parents of the popular hybrid saucer magnolia, M. × soulangeana, the other parent being the Yulan magnolia, M. denudata.

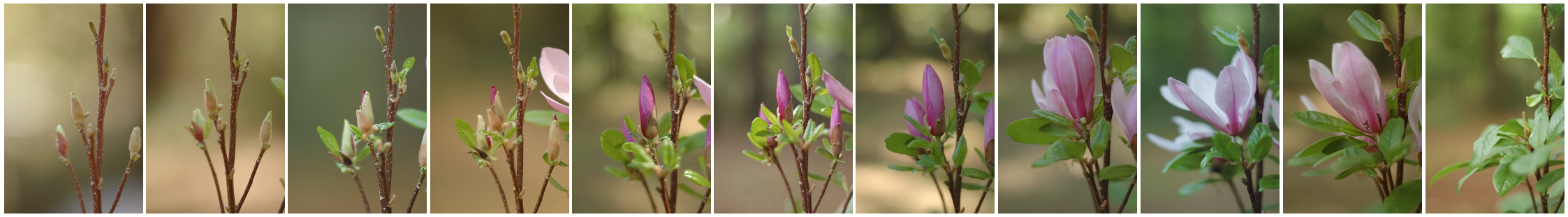
Magnolia liliiflora blooming: a series of photographs taken one per day in the Spring of 2006 in Gainesville, Florida

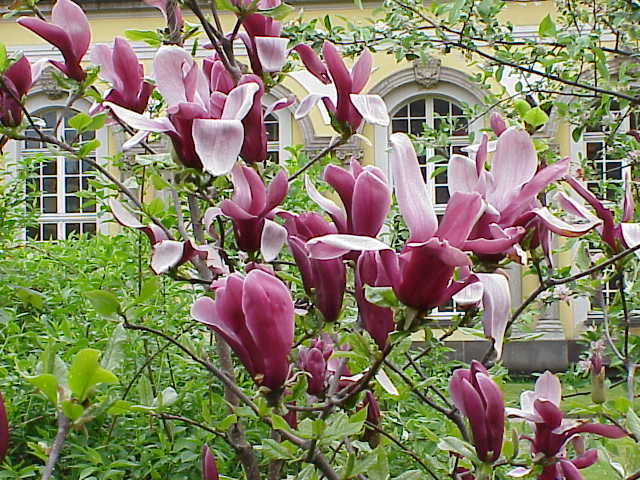

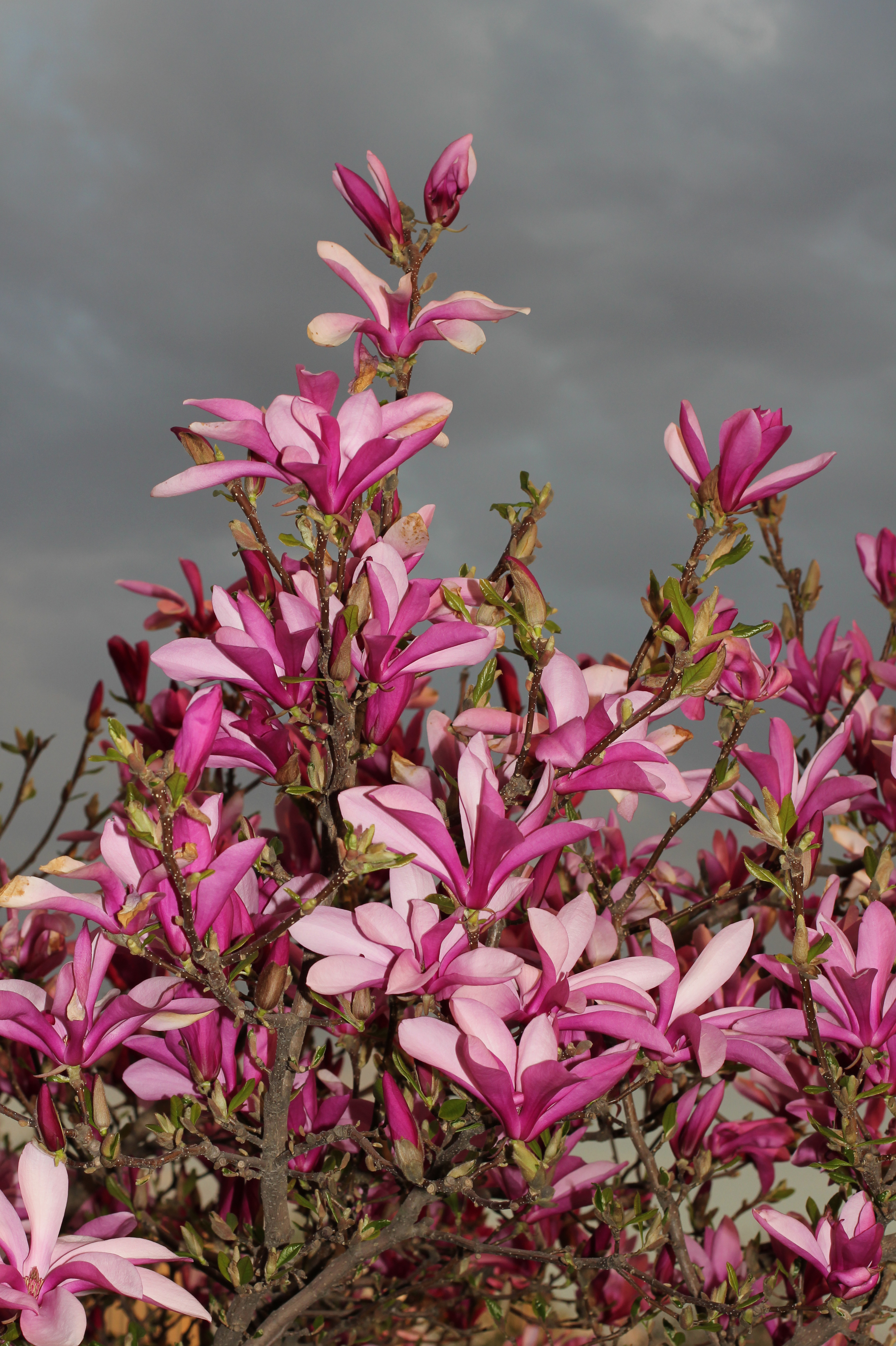

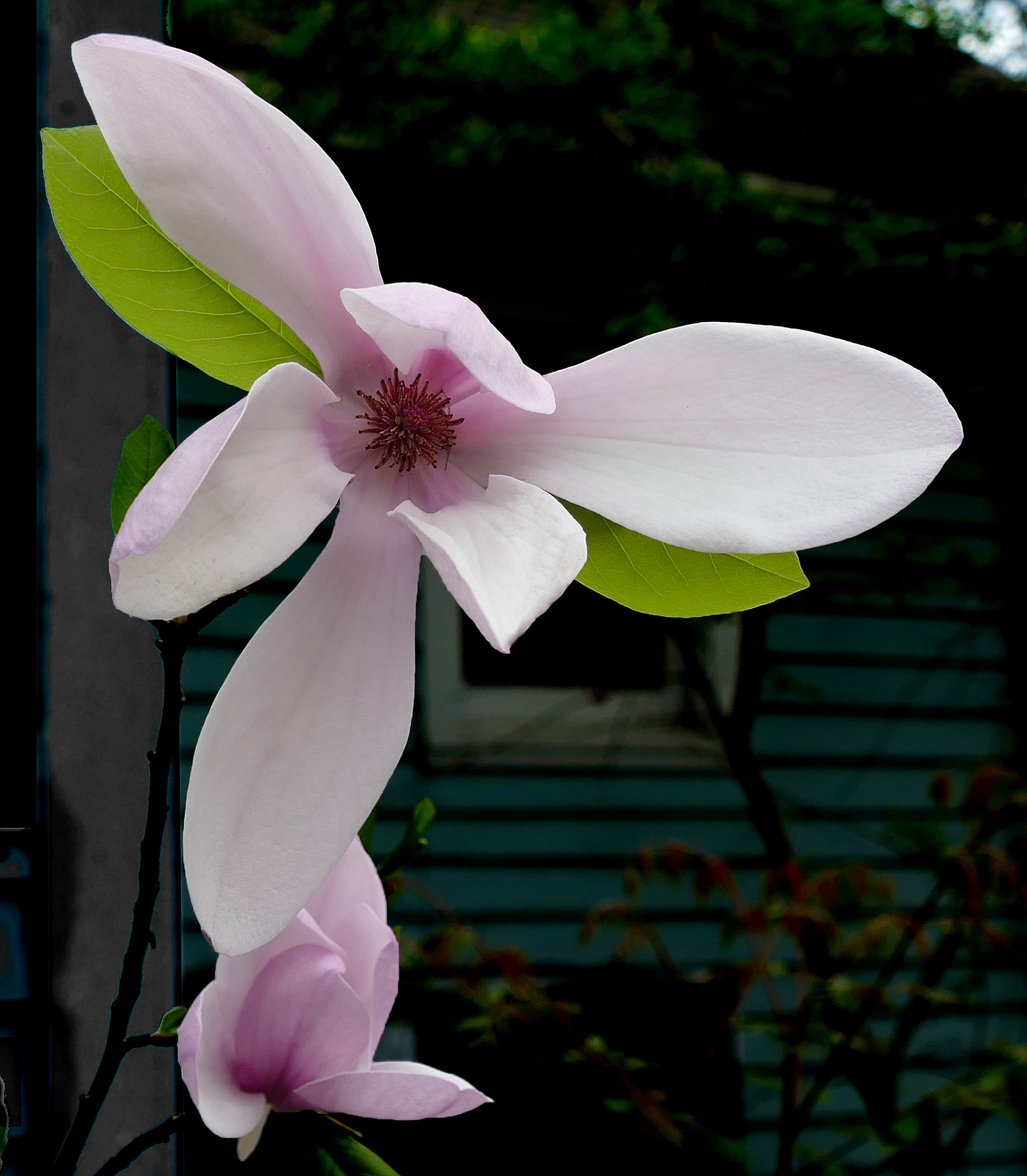

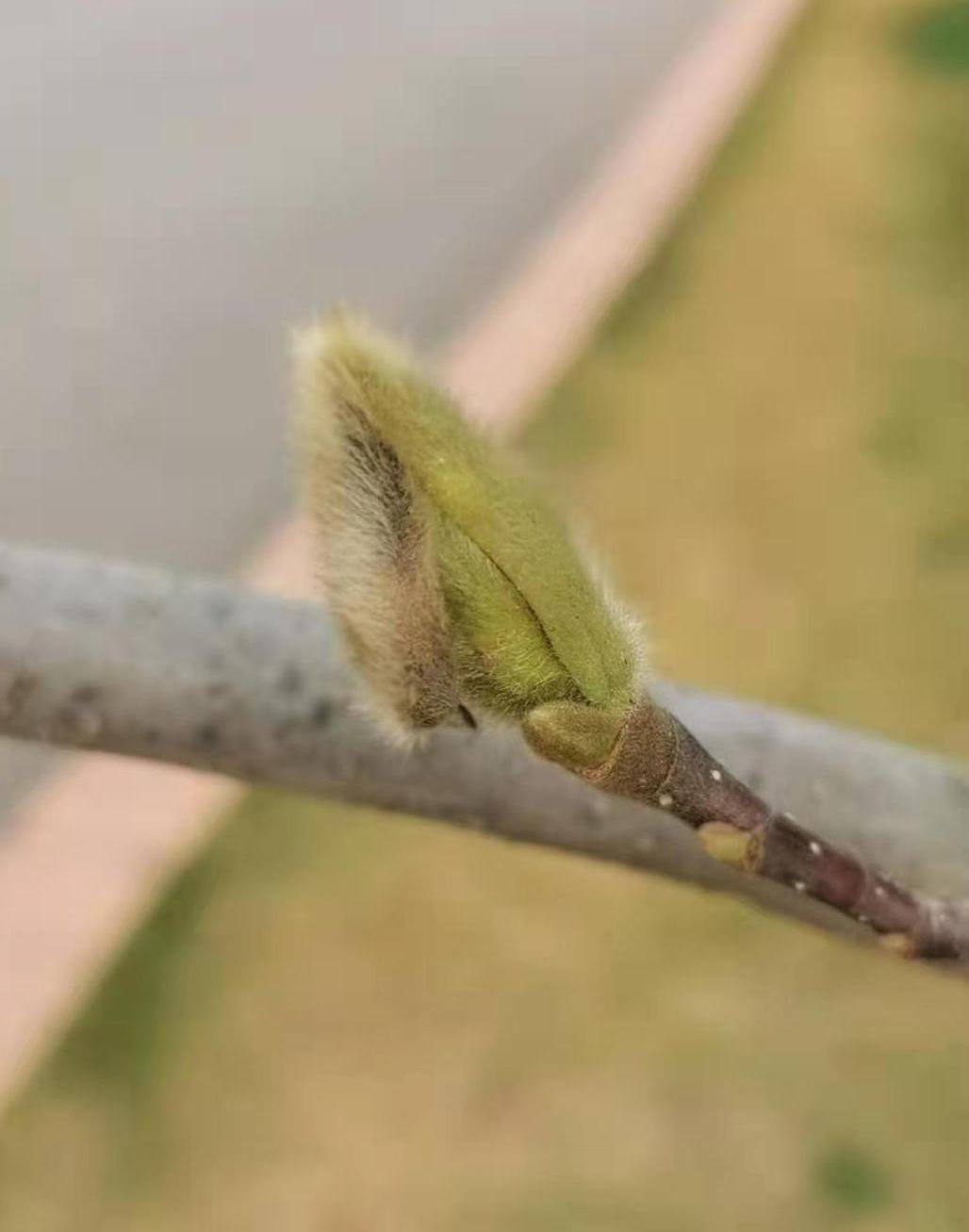
