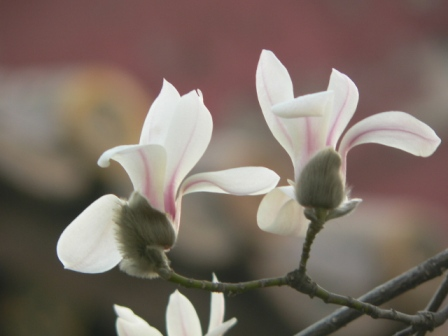

Conservation status
- Least Concern (IUCN 3.1)

Scientific classification
- Kingdom: Plantae
- Clade: Embryophytes
- Clade: Tracheophytes
- Clade: Spermatophytes
- Clade: Angiosperms
- Clade: Magnoliids
- Order: Magnoliales
- Family: Magnoliaceae
- Genus: Magnolia
- Subgenus: Magnolia subg. Yulania
- Section: Magnolia sect. Yulania
- Subsection: Magnolia subsect. Yulania
- Species: M. denudata

Binomial name
- Magnolia denudata Desr.

Synonyms
- Gwillimia yulan (Desf.) Kostel.; Lassonia heptapeta Buc'hoz; Magnolia alexandrina Steud.; Magnolia citriodora Steud.; Magnolia conspicua Salisb.; Magnolia cyathiformis Rinz ex K.Koch; Magnolia heptapeta (Buc'hoz) Dandy; Magnolia precia Corrêa ex Vent. nom. inval.; Magnolia spectabilis G.Nicholson nom. inval.; Magnolia superba G.Nicholson nom. inval.; Magnolia triumphans G.Nicholson nom. inval.; Magnolia yulan Desf.; Michelia yulan (Desf.) Kostel.; Yulania conspicua (Salisb.) Spach; Yulania cuneatifolia T.B.Chao, Zhi X.Chen & D.L.Fu; Yulania denudata (Desr.) D.L.Fu; Yulania pyriformis (T.D.Yang & T.C.Cui) D.L.Fu

= Magnolia denudata =

Species of plant

Magnolia denudata, the lilytree or Yulan magnolia (simplified Chinese: 玉兰花; traditional Chinese: 玉蘭花; pinyin: yùlánhuā; lit. 'jade orchid/lily'), is native to central and eastern China. It has been cultivated in Chinese Buddhist temple gardens since 600 AD. Its flowers were regarded as a symbol of purity in the Tang dynasty and it was planted in the grounds of the emperor's palace. It is the official city flower of Shanghai, China, and Daejeon, South Korea.

== Description ==
Magnolia denudata is a rather low, rounded, thickly branched, and coarse-textured tree to 30 feet (9.1 m) tall. The leaves are ovate, bright green, 15 cm long and 8 cm wide. The bark is a coarse, dark gray. The 10–16 cm white flowers that emerge from early to late spring, while beautiful and thick with a citrus-lemon fragrance, are prone to browning if subjected to frost.

== Cultivation ==
Magnolia denudata is used as an ornamental tree in gardens. It is similar to other magnolias in that it likes rich, moist soil and should be planted in a location where it is protected from elemental extremes. This plant has gained the Royal Horticultural Society's Award of Garden Merit.

== Gallery ==
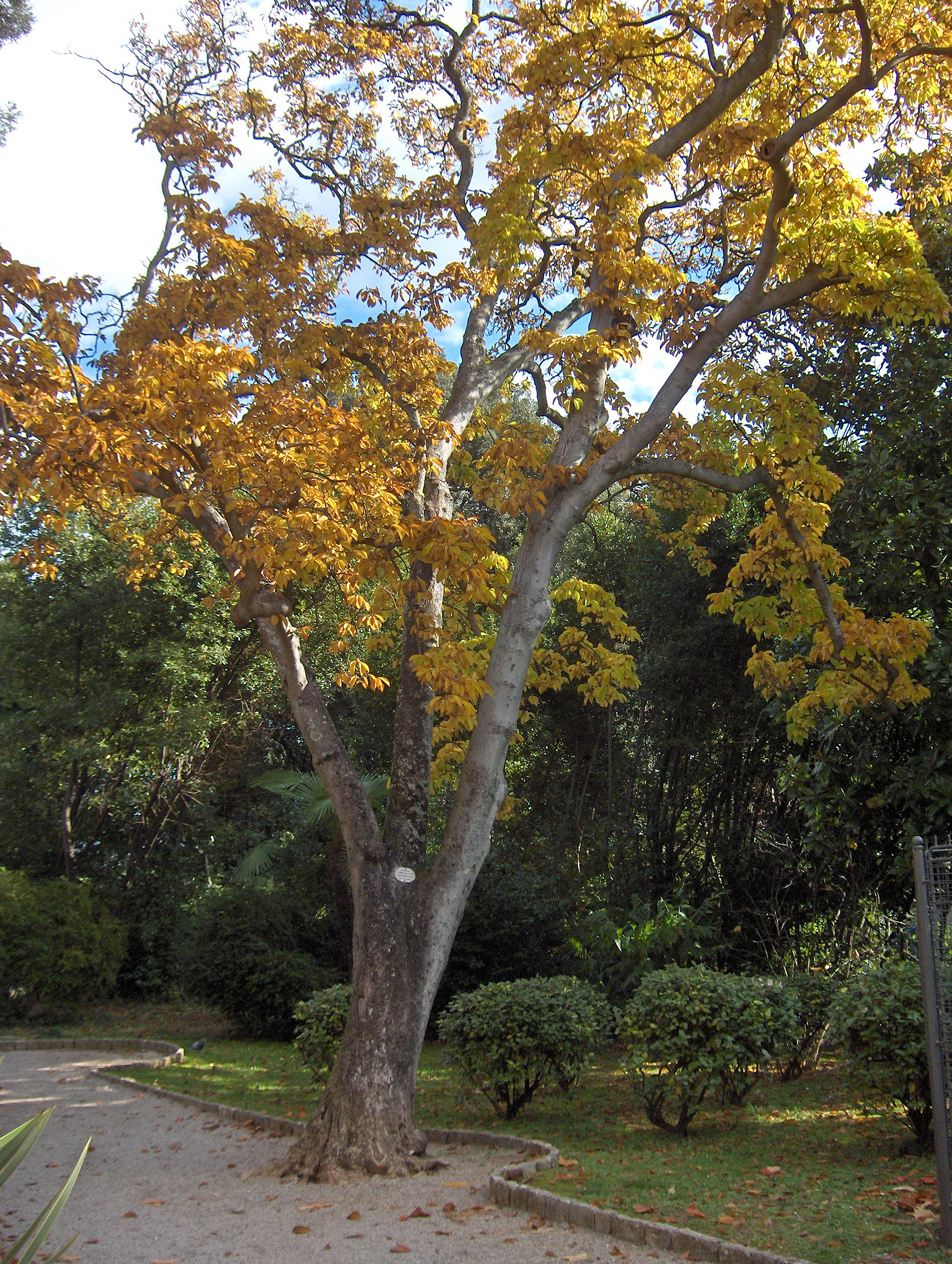
View of mature Magnolia denudata
- Botanical Park, Opatija, Croatia

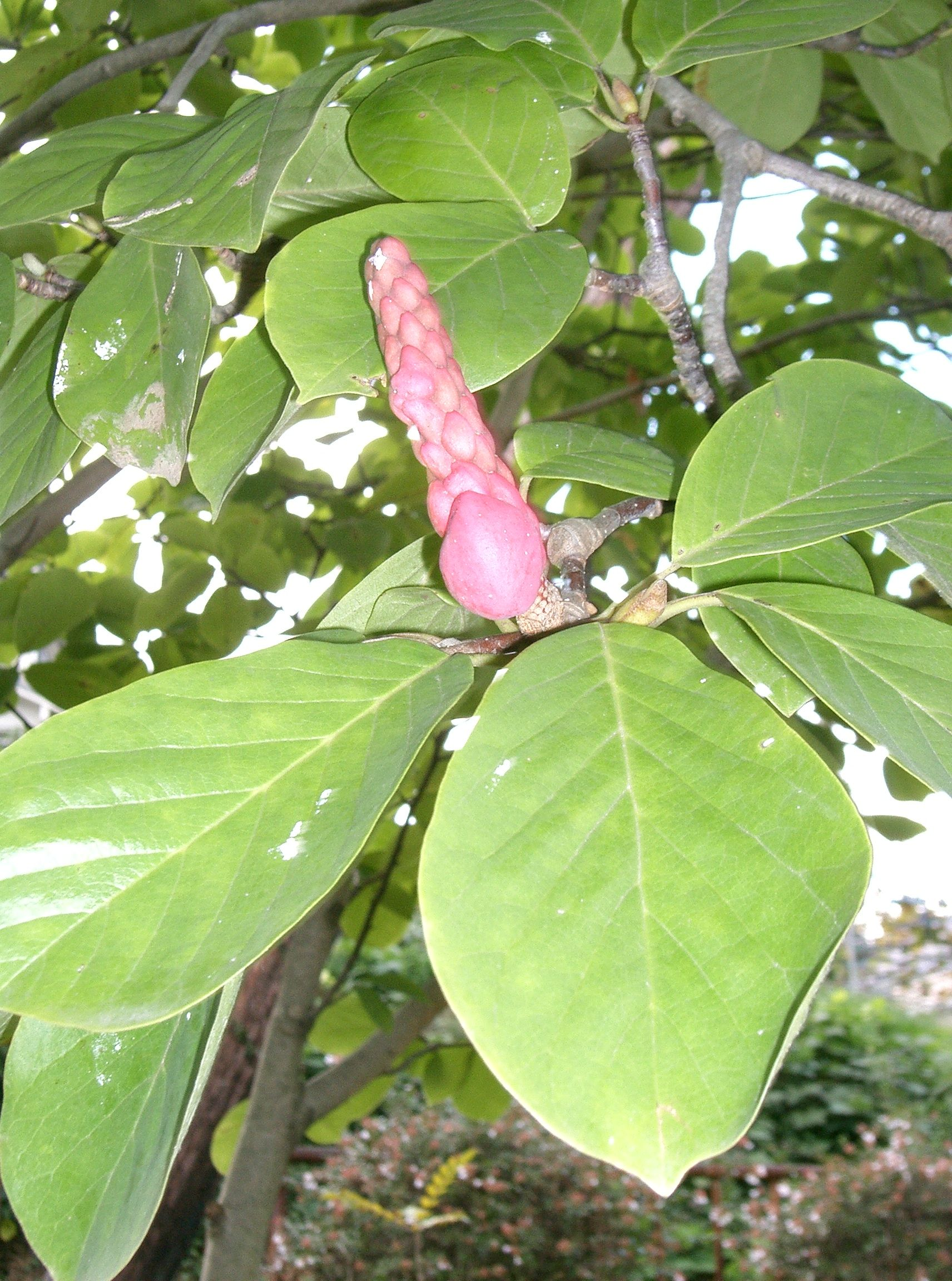
Leaves and fruit

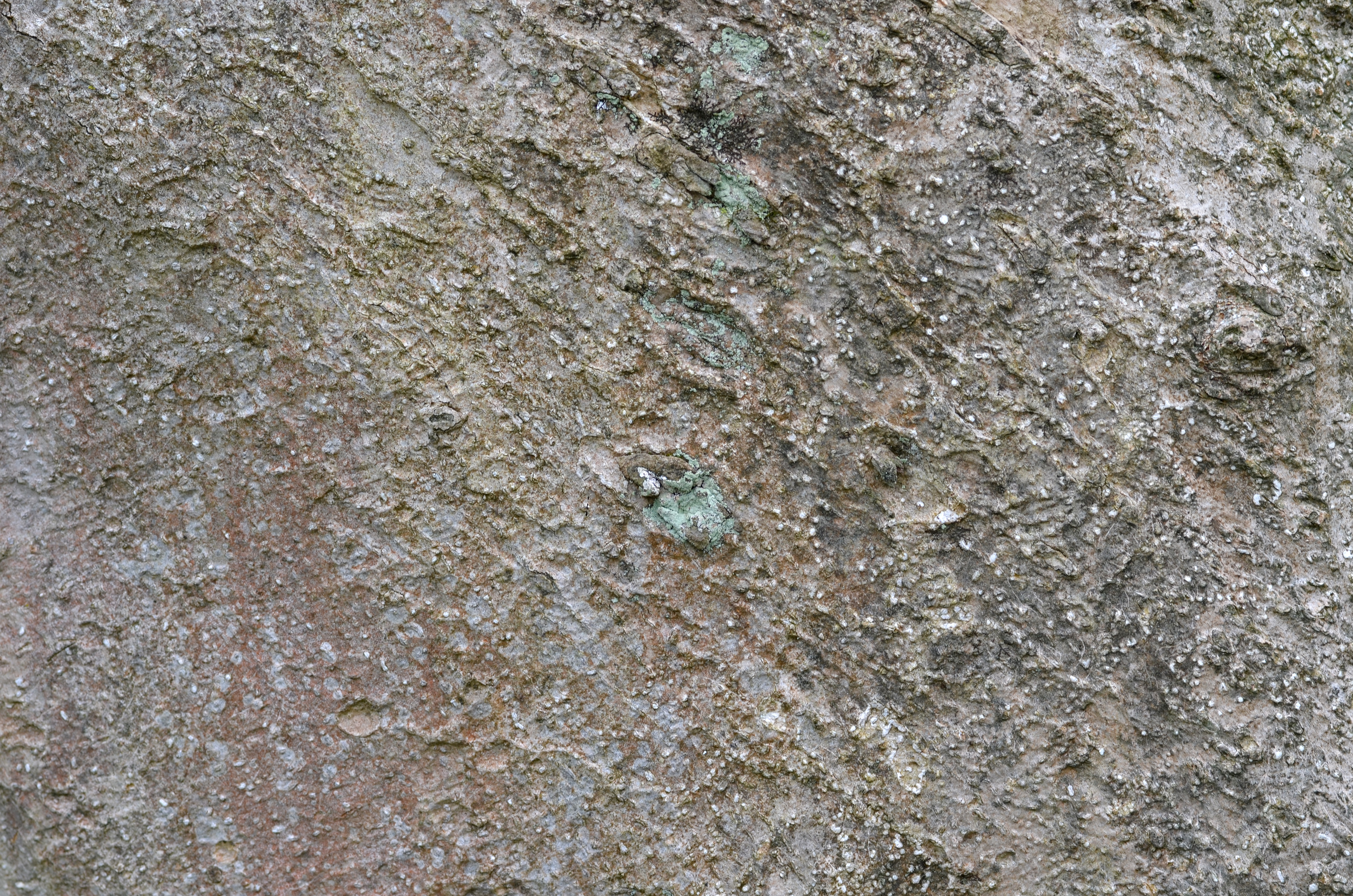
Bark

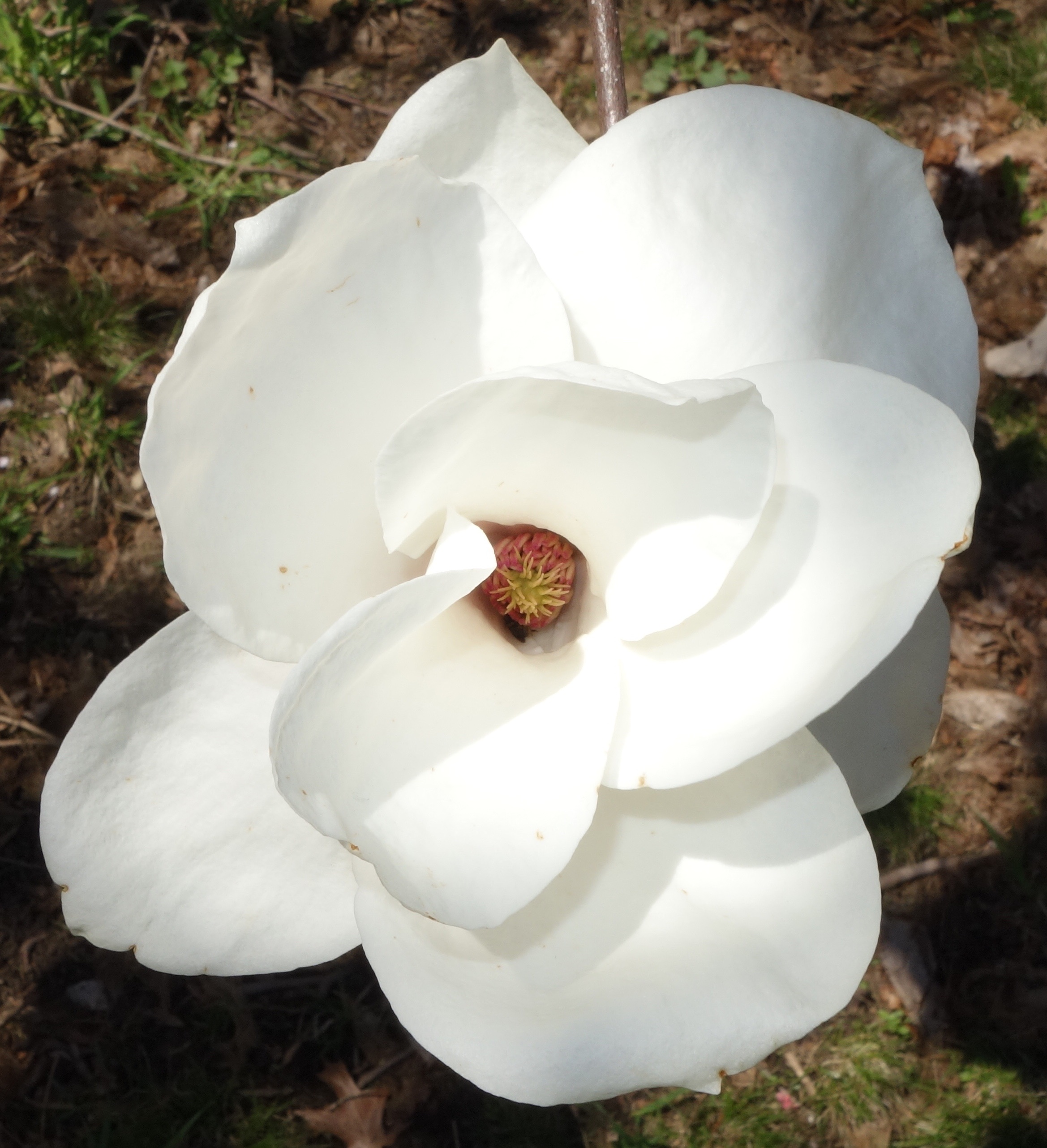
Magnolia denudata flower

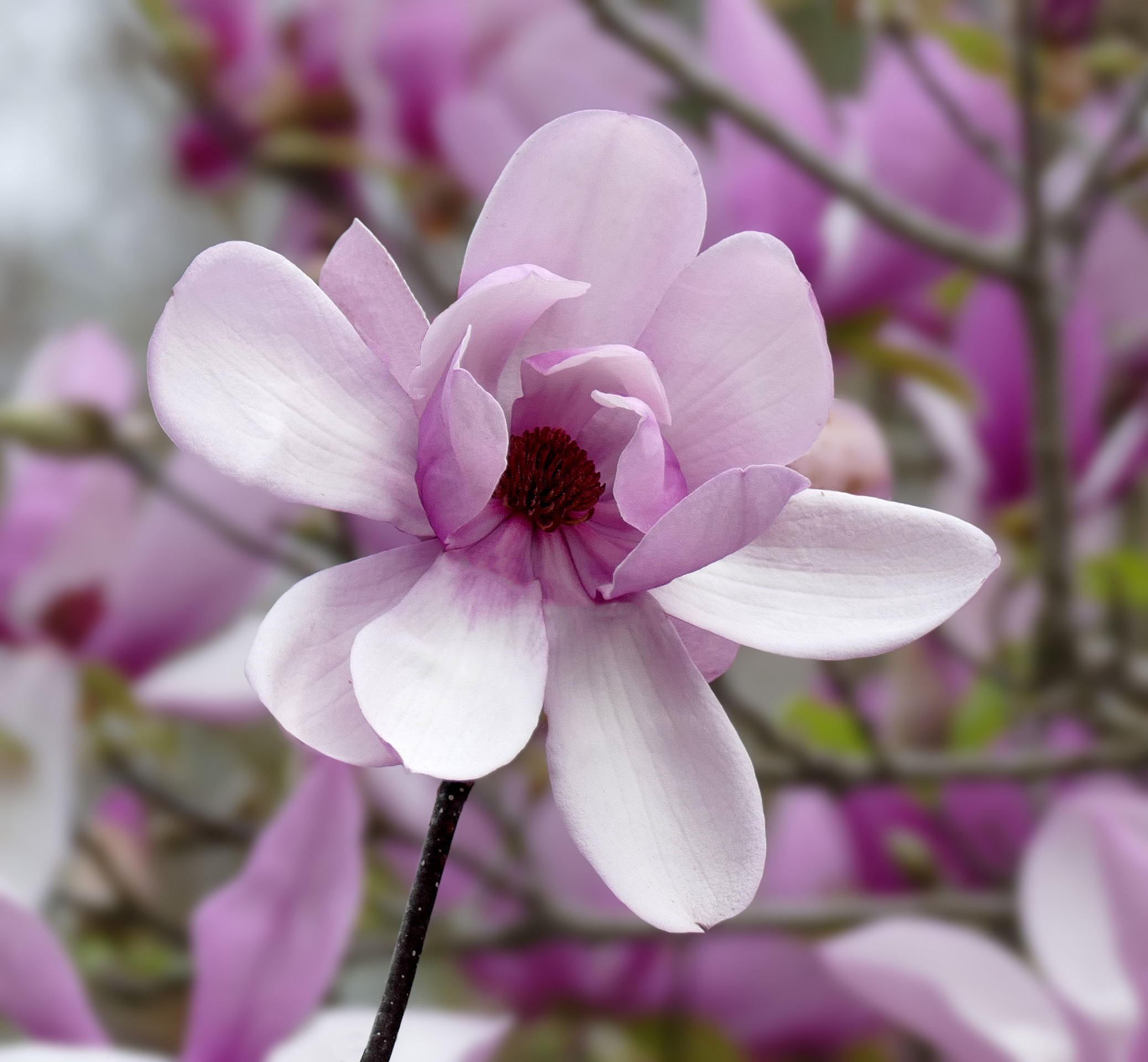
M. × soulangeana: hybrid of M. denudata & M. liliiflora
