= Flora of the Sierra Nevada alpine zone =

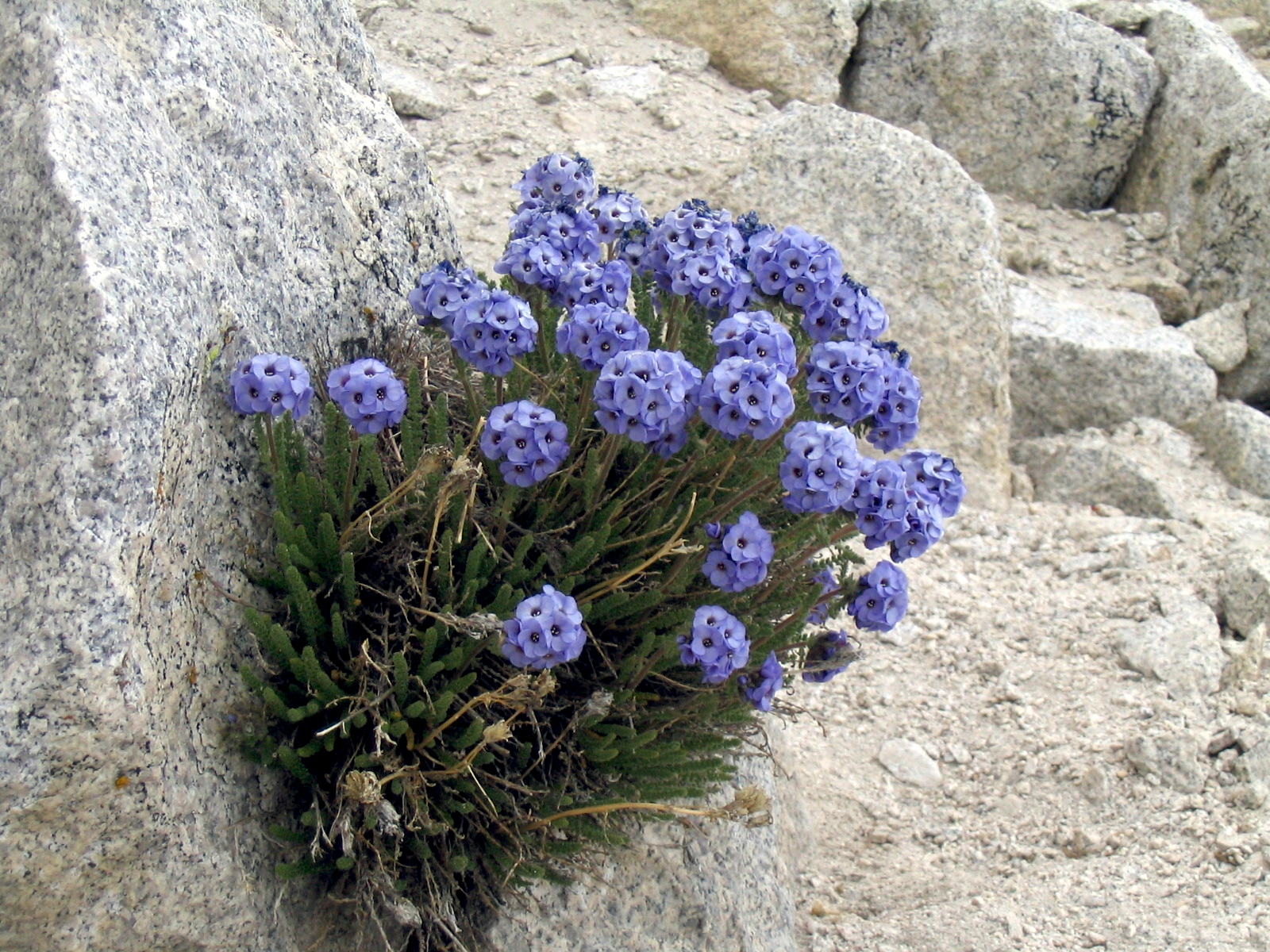
The brightly colored sky pilot (Polemonium eximium), considered to be among the most beautiful of the Sierra Nevada wildflowers, grows in very harsh conditions to elevations of 13,000 feet (4,000 m), which is near the upper limit of plant growth in California.

The flora of the U.S. Sierra Nevada alpine zone is characterized by small, low growing, cushion and mat forming plants that can survive the harsh conditions in the high-altitude alpine zone above the timber line. These flora often occur in alpine fell-fields. The Sierra Nevada alpine zone lacks a dominant plant species that characterizes it, so may or may not be called a vegetation type. But it is found above the subalpine forest, which is the highest in a succession of recognized vegetation types at increasing elevations.

Botanists have ranked the Sierra Nevada alpine zone floral bloom as one of California's foremost wildflower displays, with flowers of fantastic color and abundance. Many of the alpine species are notable for large and showy flowers, which must compete for the pollinators during brief growing seasons. Botanist Philip A. Munz wrote, "These natural rock gardens are spectacular sights when in full flower." Botanist Laird R. Blackwell wrote, "Up here... the flowers seem to glow... perhaps only the flowers of the harsh desert can rival the alpine flowers for intensity."

Over 90% of California's alpine flora are perennial herbs. Annuals are not common. Depending on the elevation used to define its lower boundary, the Sierra Nevada alpine zone may have almost 600 species, about 200 of which are only found here (endemic). The flora includes plants that are descended from the plants that survived the glaciation of the last ice age (relict plants), because they were growing on mountain peaks that stood above the ice sheets like islands.

== Environmental conditions influencing flora ==
The alpine zone, or alpine fell-field, is above the tree line, generally at 11,000 to 11,500 feet (3,400 to 3,500 m) in the south, and 9,900 feet (3,000 m) to 10,500 feet (3,200 m) in the north. The plants are influenced by having to endure long and very cold winters, poor to no soils, constant high winds, intense sunlight, and a short cool and dry growing season in the summer, that lasts only about 6–8 weeks.

Winds are strong and constant. The constant wind makes unsheltered areas colder than sheltered spots, depositing snow in some places, while scouring the snow out of other locations. The constant wind increases loss of water from the plants to the atmosphere (transpiration). Sunlight is intense. Soils are thin and rocky, or absent. Soils are low in moisture. Rainfall is rare. Almost all of the 35 to 40 inches (0.89 to 1.02 m) of annual precipitation falls as snow, and growing season can be as short as just days. Annual plants must quickly grow to maturity, and all plants must quickly flower and develop mature seed.

== Characteristic growth patterns and physiology ==
Above the tree line, extreme winds preclude tree-like growth. Constant winds hitting the plants limits their size and flattens their shape. Small size or dwarfism is therefore an adaptive feature to the extremes, and most alpine plants are just a few inches tall. One botanist wrote, "Plants adapt by scrunching down close to the ground where botanists have to crawl around on their bellies with hand lenses to fully appreciate the diversity of life... Plants are mere centimeters tall, forming a mat so dense that it's hard to pick out separate species"., Another noted, "a world of miniature plants only a few inches high... leaves huddle near the ground or contour it with mats or cushions. Typically, the leaves of these plants are waxy or densely hairy - anything to protect them from the wind and intense solar radiation".

Alpine plants have many adaptations to aridity and intense sunlight in common with desert plants. Alpine plants often have gray appearance from hairs covering the leaves, which reflect the intense sunlight, and protect from winds that cause high rates of water loss through transpiration. Many Sierra Nevada alpine plants have reddish or whitish leaves to protect them from damage from intense ultraviolet radiation in the alpine zone. Fleshy roots and underground organs store food in the form of starches and sugars, allowing the plant to quickly grow when snow melts. Many plants form flower buds during the summer before the summer that they open, allowing a quick bloom for the short growing season.

Optimal temperatures for physiological processes may be lower than for lower elevation plants, and optimal light intensity for photosynthesis may be higher. Laboratory experiments showed the sierra Nevada alpine flora exhibited characteristic physiological responses. Germination best occurred at temperatures from 20 to 30 °C (68 to 86 °F). In the laboratory, there was strong dormancy control by short photoperiod, compared to lower elevation populations which had dormancy induced by either short or long photoperiods.

== Evolutionary history and affinities ==
The flora has developed relatively recently, on its own, from western American sources. During the glaciation of the last ice age, some peaks stood out above the ice sheet (nunataks), and thus have a high diversity of pre-ice age alpine plants (relicts), an example being the Dana Plateau at Tioga Pass. Half of all the alpine plants found in the Sierra Nevada can be found on the Dana Plateau.

Many species also occur in, or have close relatives in, the Cascade Range and Rocky Mountains, e.g., the Penstemons (Penstemon spp., and Polemoniums (Polemoneaceae spp.).

A small group of Sierra Nevada alpine plants can be found around the world in northern latitudes, which is called (circumboreal). An example is bush cinquefoil (Potentilla fruticosa), which ranges throughout arctic regions of Alaska, Labrador, and the high mountains of Eurasia.

== Diversity and taxa ==
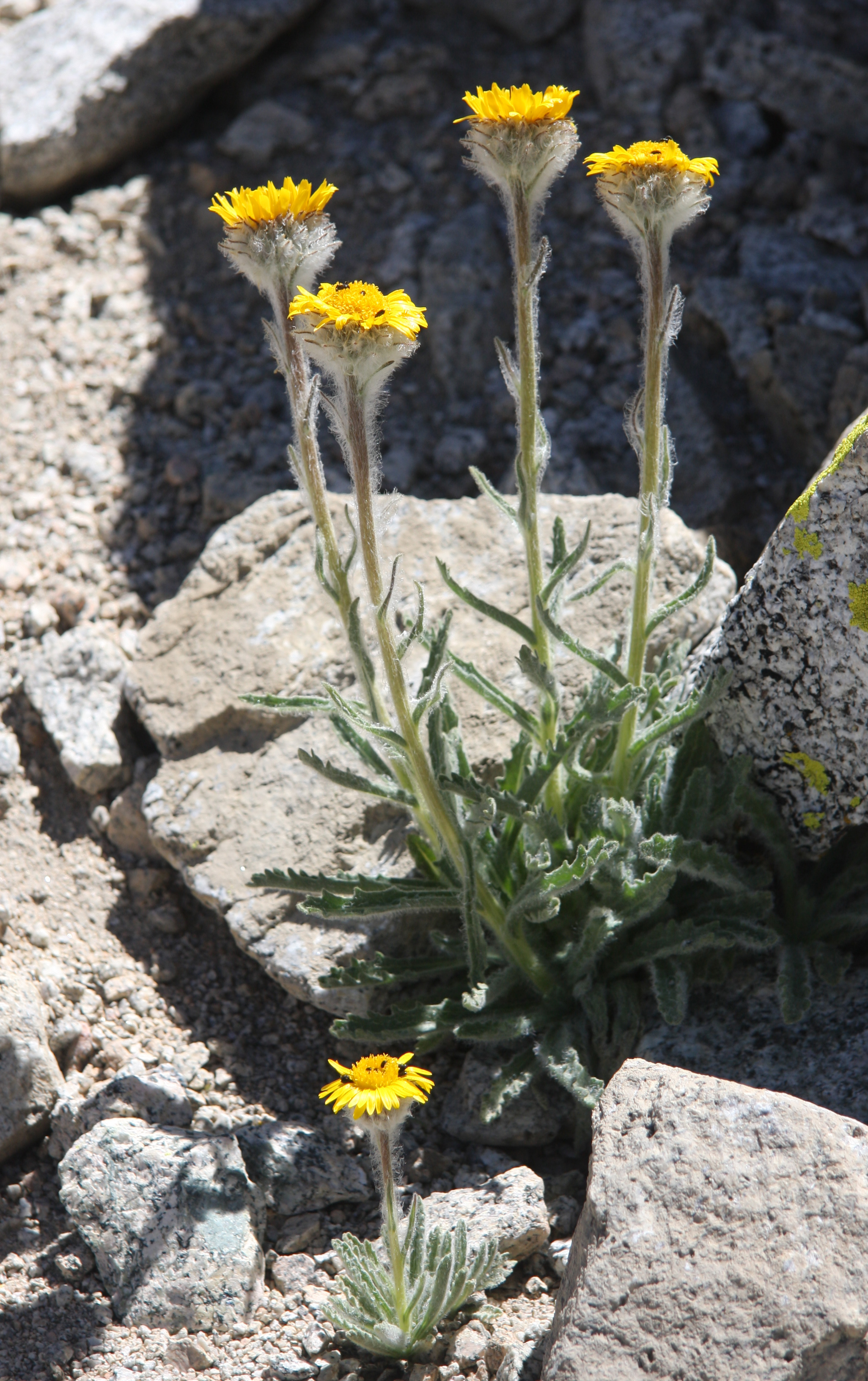
Sunflower family members have the largest number of species represented, like this alpine gold (Hulsea algida, which grows only in rocky talus and up to elevations of 13,000 feet (4,000 m).

Broad-leaved, erect perennials constitute about 50% of the species, with perennial graminoid (grasses or grass-like plants) species next at about 21%, and plants growing as mats or cushions at about 11%. Annuals plus woody shrubs total only about 6% of the flora.

There are over 500 floral species above 3,300 metres (10,800 ft), and almost 400 above 3,500 metres (11,500 ft). Almost 100 species reach elevations of 4,000 metres (13,000 ft), and more than 25 reach 4,200 metres (13,800 ft).

Six plant families encompass more than 50% of the alpine zone species. The sunflower family (Asteraceae) is represented by about 55 species, there are almost 40 species from the grass family (Poaceae), the mustard family (Brassicaceae) has 34 species, and sedges (Cyperaceae) have over 30 species represented.

The largest genus is Carex, the "true sedge", with about 50 species above 3,300 metres (10,800 ft), followed by Draba in the mustard family, then Lupinus in the legume family (Fabaceae) with about 10 species.

Almost 70 species (about 17% of the flora) can be found in both subalpine and alpine habitats. Over 25% range from the alpine zone all the way to foothill habitats below 1,200 metres (3,900 ft). Nine species are only found in the alpine zone (obligate) above 3,500 metres (11,500 ft).

In a transectional study running from the desert near Bishop, California (elevation 1,400 metres (4,600 ft)), to Piute Pass (elevation 3,540 metres (11,610 ft)), perennials dominated, but also present were several annual species. Annuals are also rare in other alpine floras, including arctic.

Transpiration rates are of importance in determining local distribution patterns of flora of the Sierra Nevada alpine zone.

=== Annuals ===
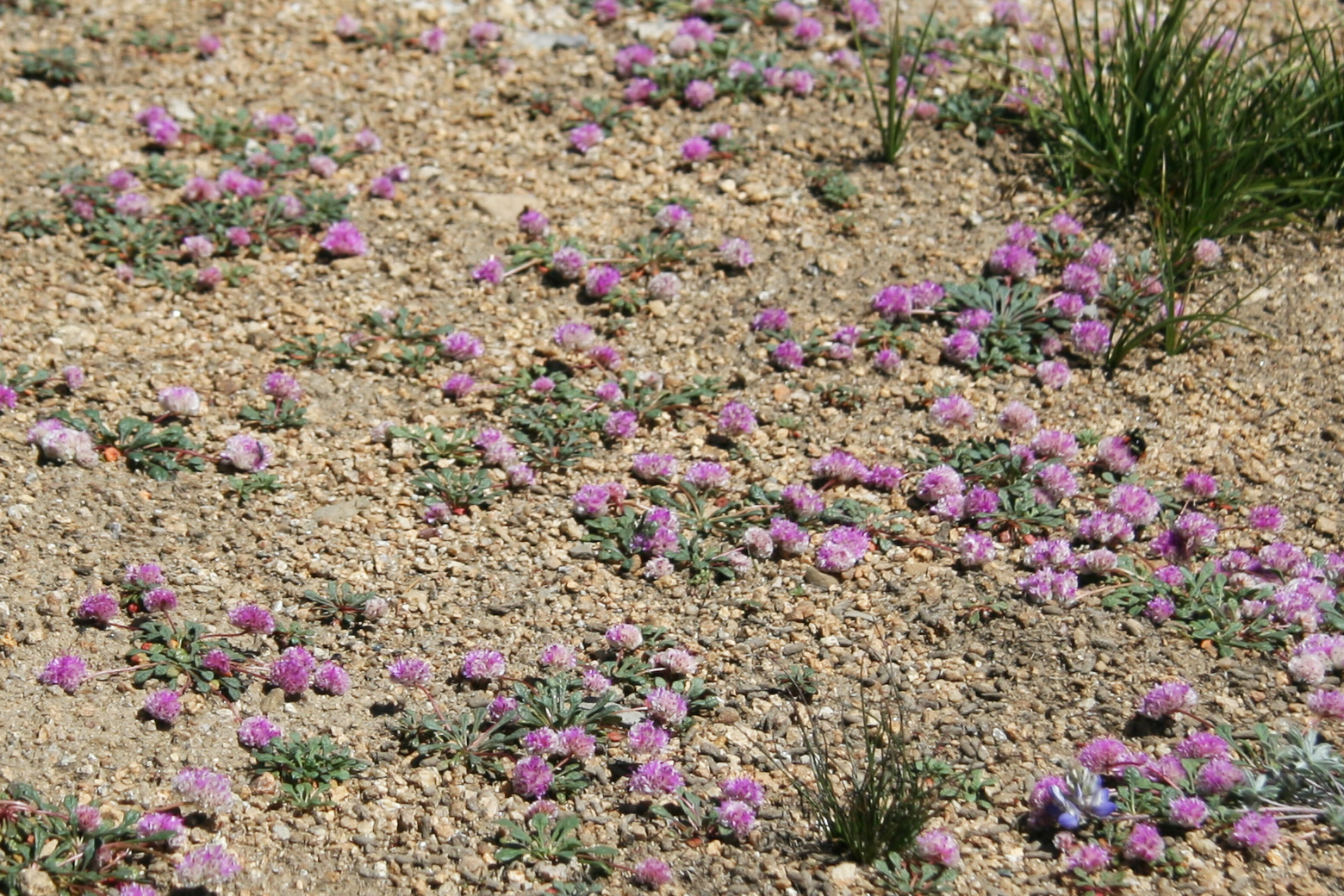
Alpine Pussypaws (Cistanthe umbellata) with alpine grasses.

Annuals plus woody shrubs constitute only about 6% of the number of Sierra Nevada alpine floral species.

Sierra gentian (Gentianopsis holopetala), in the gentian family (Gentianaceae), is an erect or sprawling annual or perennial, growing in wet meadows from 6,000 to 13,000 feet (1,800 to 4,000 m) elevation.

Toothed owl's clover (Orthocarpus cuspidatus) is not a true clover, but is in the broomrape family (Orobanche).

Low growing pussypaws (Cistanthe umbellata), in the purslane family (Portulacaceae), usually grows in damp, partially shaded areas, and can be found up to as high as 14,000 feet (4,300 m) elevation. It grows in a basal rosette, radiating leaf bearing and flower-head bearing stems that hug the ground. When the ground warms, the stems lying on the ground rise, to a steep angle, lifting the flower heads.

=== Perennials ===
Characteristic perennials are low growing, small, and may be erect or form mats or cushions. Broad-leaved, erect perennials constitute 50% of the diversity of Sierra Nevada alpine species, with mats and cushions 11%.

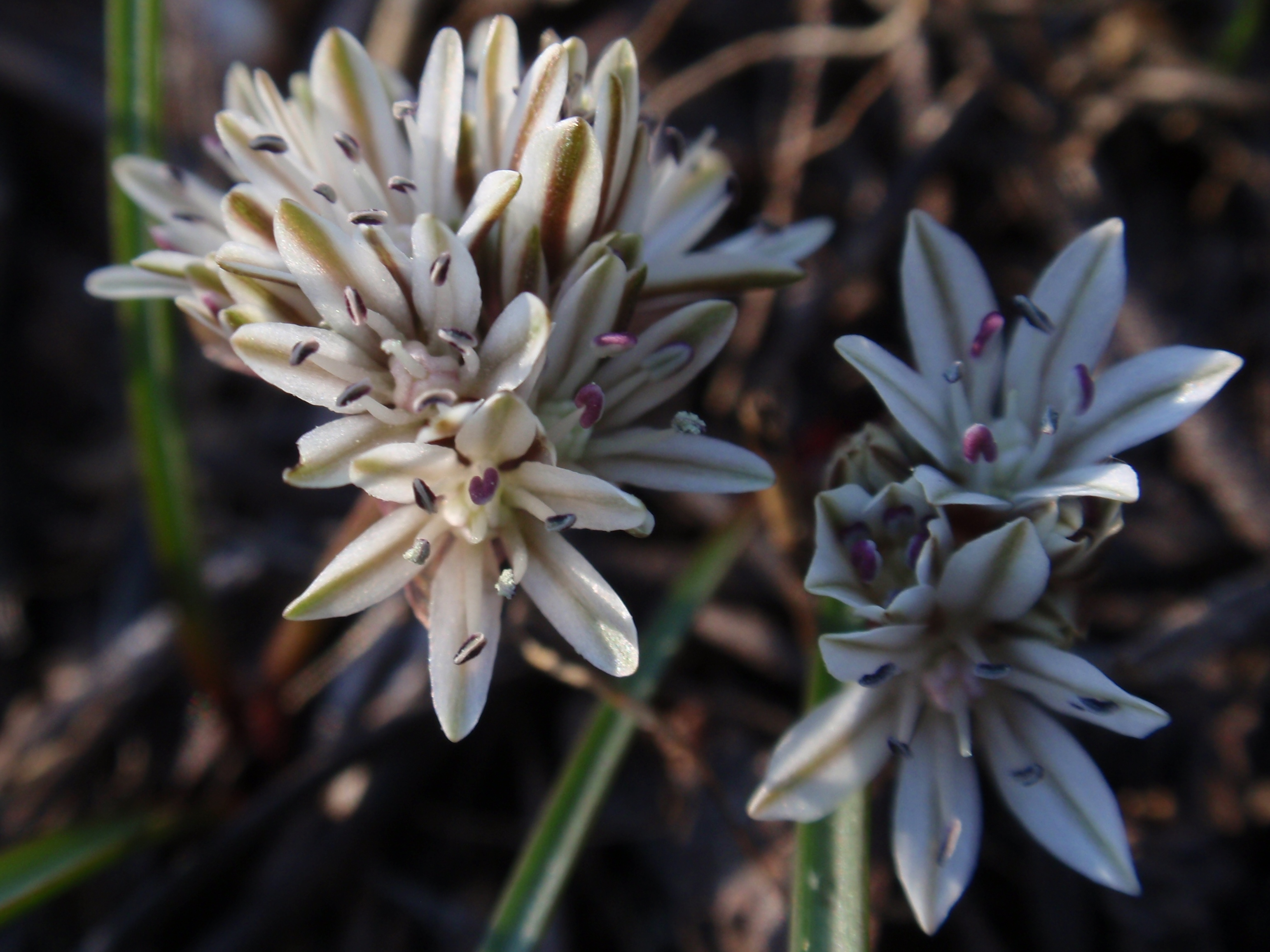
Red sierra onion (Allium obtusum)

Swamp onion (Allium validum) is a perennial bulb in the onion family (Alliaceae) found in alpine wetlands to 11,200 feet (3,400 m). The low-growing head of flowers of red sierra onion (Allium obtusum) appears to sit on the ground.

In the carrot family (Apiaceae), Clemen's mountain parsley (Oreonana clementis) forms a dense mat of tiny plants with tiny leave that might cover several square yards the area like a blanket. Sierra podistera (Podistera nevadensis) is compact, stemless, and found only above the timberline to 13,000 feet (4,000 m).

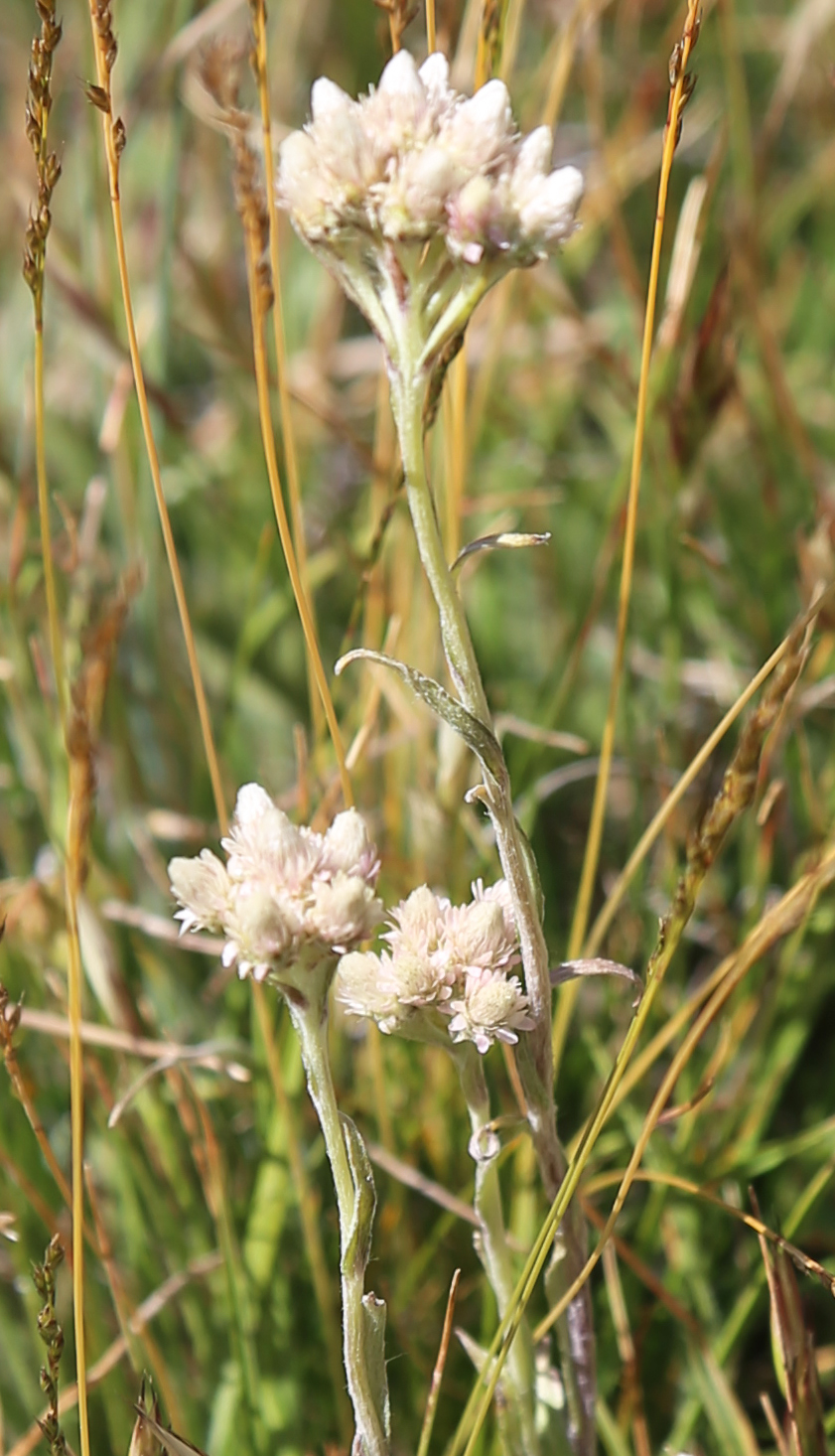
Rosy pussytoes (Antennaria rosea)

Sunflower family (Asteraceae) perennials include western snakeroot (Ageratina occidentalis), an erect perennial to subshrub in the sunflower family that is found up to 12,100 feet (3,700 m). Flat-topped pussytoes (Antennaria corymbosa) is a small (to 16 inches (0.41 m)), mat-forming perennial herb, spreading via a tangled network of stolons. In the same genus are rosy pussytoes (A. rosea) and the mat forming Alpine Everlasting (A. media). Alpine aster (Aster alpigenus) stems may be lying on the ground (decumbent) or erect, and can be found up to 12,000 feet (3,700 m) elevations. Dusty maidens (Chaenactis douglasii var. alpina), also called pincushion plant, is a sunflower family plant with cobwebby stems, and leaves and stems like a miniaturized version of its cousin, dusty maidens (var. douglasii). Yellow rabbitbrush (Chrysothamnus viscidiflorus) grows on dry, open slopes to 13,000 feet (4,000 m), and Parry's rabbitbrush (C. parryi) on mountainsides and flats to 12,000 feet (3,700 m).

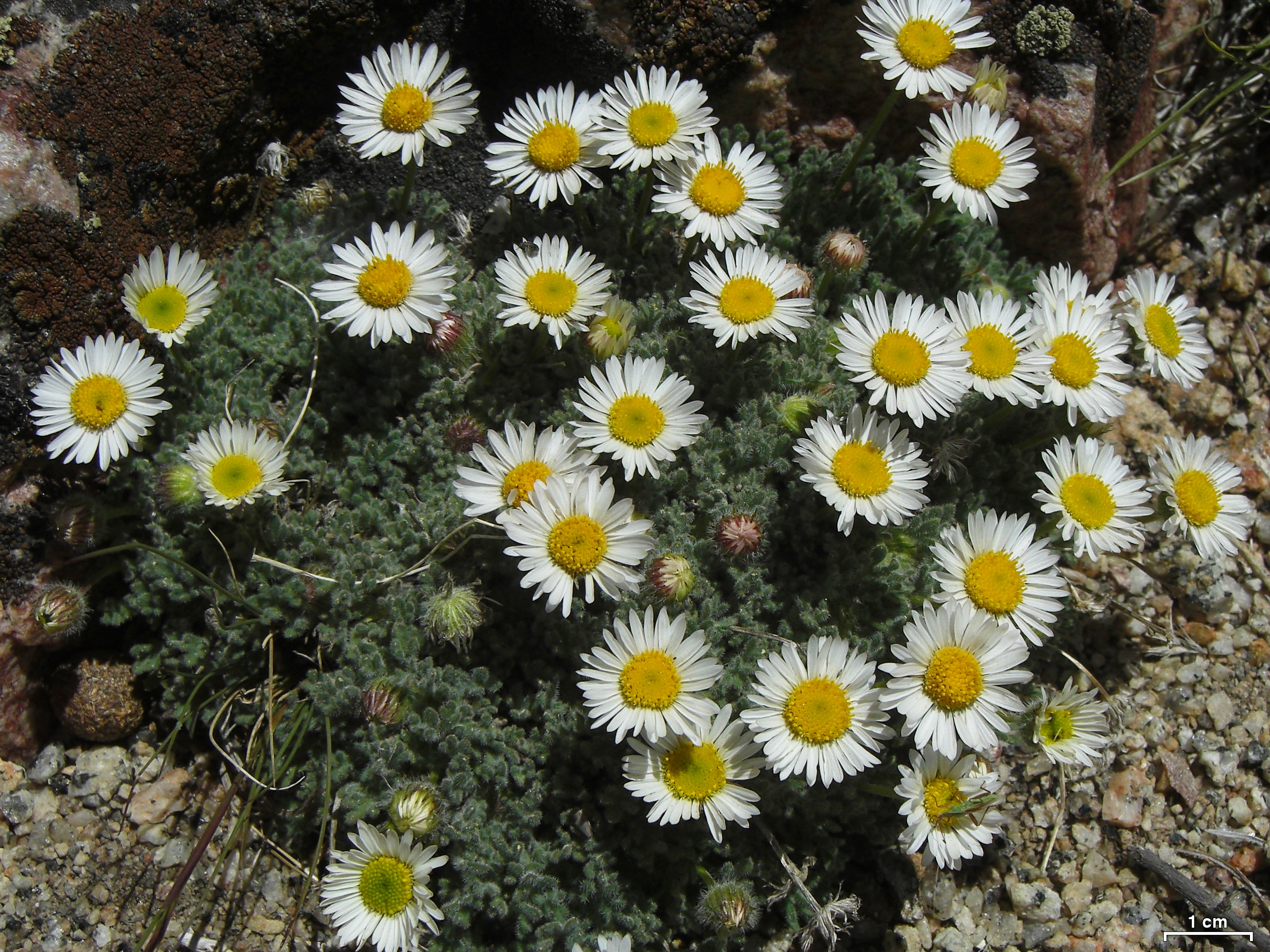
Dwarf mountain fleabane (Erigeron compositus) grows to 14,000 feet (4,300 m)

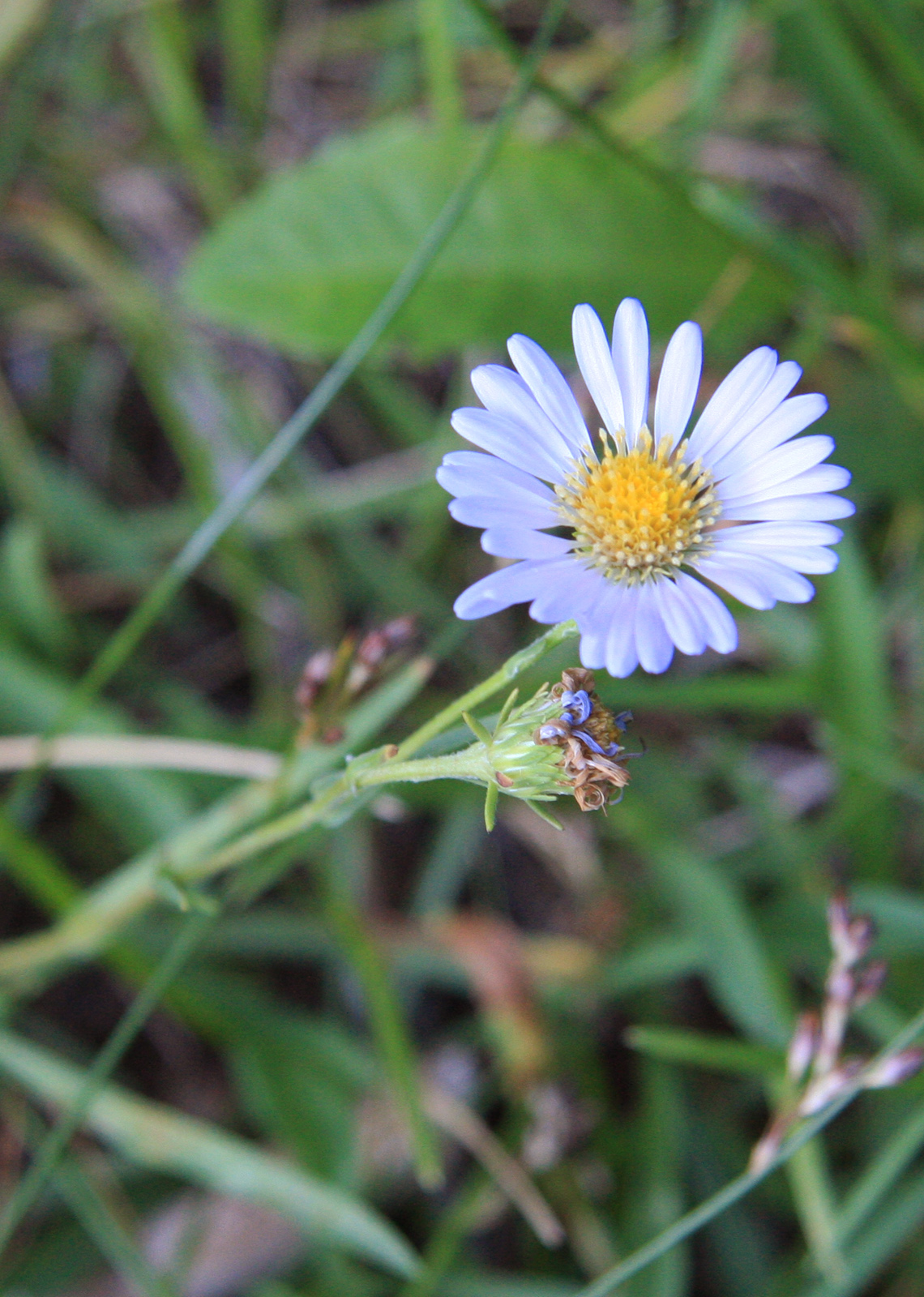
Dwarf daisy, (E. pygmaeus)

Alpine fleabanes, or daisies, are sunflower family members. They include dwarf mountain fleabane, or cut-leaf daisy (Erigeron compositus), typifies the dwarfed growth pattern of the alpine zone, with disproportionately large flower heads compared to body size (1/4 to 1/2 the height of the flower stem). It grows as a mat or cushion on rocky slopes, talus, and rock ledges, to 14,000 feet (4,300 m) elevation. Also growing to 14,000 feet (4,300 m) elevation is the shorter rambling fleabane (E. vagus), which grows in talus and only gets 2 inches (5.1 cm) tall. dwarf daisy, (E. pygmaeus), grows from a woody taproot as a compact, cushion forming plant that can be found on rocky slopes and flats from 9,500 to 13,500 feet (2,900 to 4,100 m). It provides some of the most vivid color in the alpine zone, with flowers sometimes blooming in such profusion that they cover the leaves and rocky sloes and flats below. Glacial daisy (E. glacialis) grows to 11,200 feet (3,400 m), often in large colonies. Alpine daisy, or loose daisy (E. vagus) grows in rocky scree and in rock crevices, from 11,000 feet (3,400 m) to as high as 14,100 feet (4,300 m).

Golden yarrow, or wooly sunflower (Eriophyllum lanatum), found to 13,000 feet (4,000 m), is not a true yarrow, but another member of the sunflower family, and is sometimes an annual. Prickly hawkweed (Hieracium horridum) is hairy and grows in rocky places and crevices. Foul smelling alpine gold (Hulsea algida) occurs only on talus (the pile of rocks at the bottom of cliffs), and rocky peaks as high as 13,000 feet (4,000 m). It is unusually "tall" for an alpine zone plant, with stems reaching 1 1/2 feet (0.46 m). At higher eleveations above the timber line, is a dwarf variety of pumice hulsea (H. vestita subsp. pygmaea) growing to 13,000 feet (4,000 m).

Anderson's mountain crown (Oreostemma alpigenum) is another sunflower family erect perennial, found below 11,500 feet (3,500 m). Alpine rock butterweed (Packera werneriifolia) is found on dry rocky slopes to 13,000 feet (4,000 m). Alpine flames, or alpine golden-star (Pyrrocoma apargioides), is closely related to whitestem goldenbush (Ericameria discoidea), and grows from a basal rosette to 12,000 feet (3,700 m). It is less well adapted to harsh alpine conditions than some other alpine zone plants, having relatively (to 4 inches (10 cm)) large leaves that are mostly hairless, and correspondingly is found growing in more protected sites, such as grassy meadows. Silky raillardella (Raillardella argentea) has fleshy leaves covered in silvery-white hairs on stems lying on the ground (decumbent), and grows to 12,000 feet (3,700 m) or 13,000 feet (4,000 m). Argenta" means "silvery', in reference to the leaves. "Dwarf mountain butterweed (Senecio fremontii) has stems lying on the rocky ground (decumbent) and grows to 12,000 feet (3,700 m). Northern goldenrod (Solidago multiradiata) grows to 12,900 feet (3,900 m) elevation, and has narrow leaves. Stemless goldenweed (Stenotus acaulis) is mat-forming.

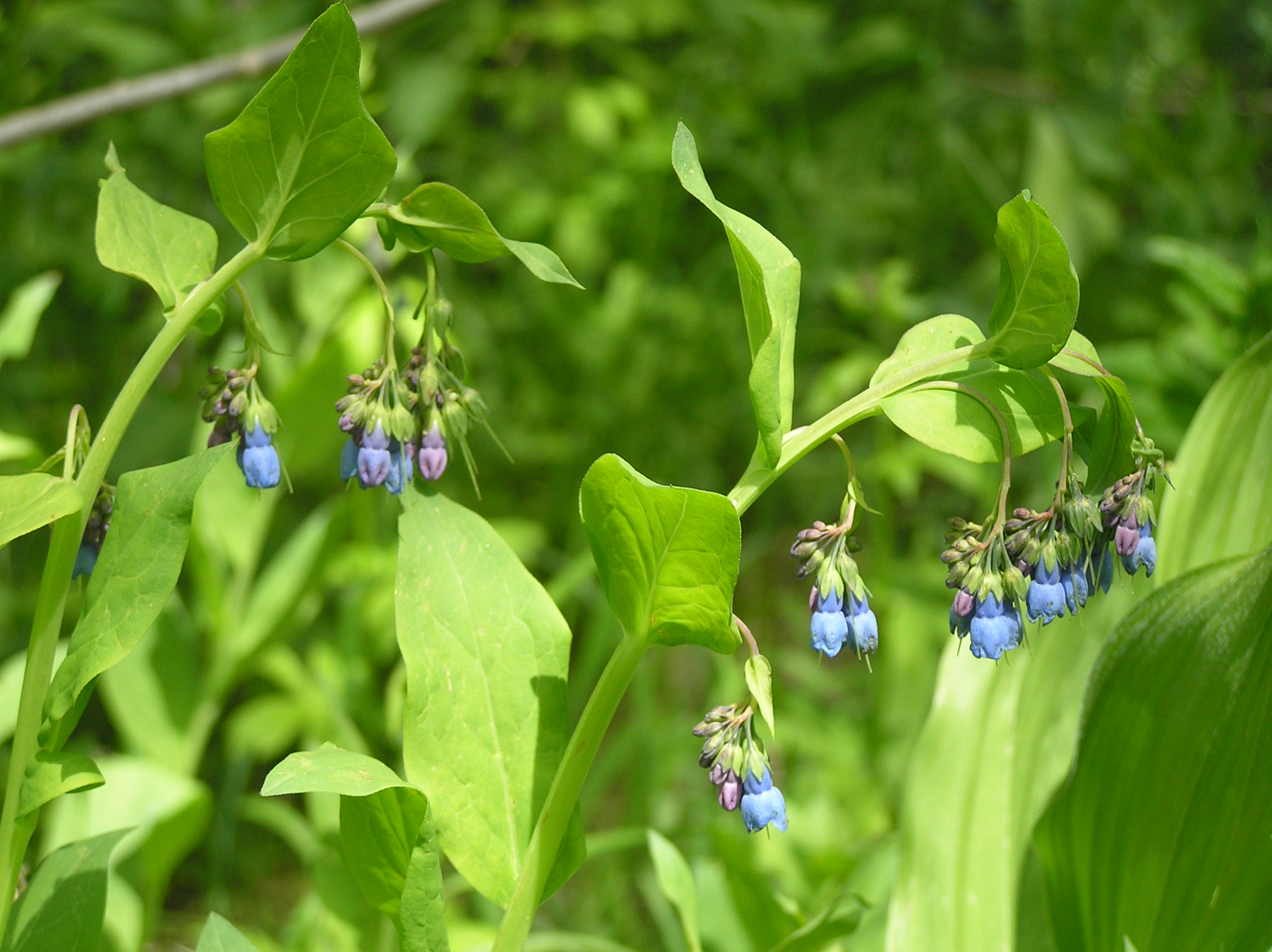
Streamside bluebells (Mertensia ciliata)

The borage family (Boraginaceae) has the genus Oreocarya, with plants similar in appearance such as low cryptantha (O. humilis), a relatively small, hairy perrential with dense, leafy stems from a woody base found up to 11,900 feet (3,600 m). Sierra forget-me-not (O. nubigena) is found at even higher elevations, to 12,900 feet (3,900 m), and is adapted to rigors of dry winds by being covered with long, stiff, bristly hairs. Timberline phacelia (Phacelia hastata) grows to 13,000 feet (4,000 m). Streamside bluebells (Mertensia ciliata) grow in shaded, moist areas to 12,000 feet (3,700 m).

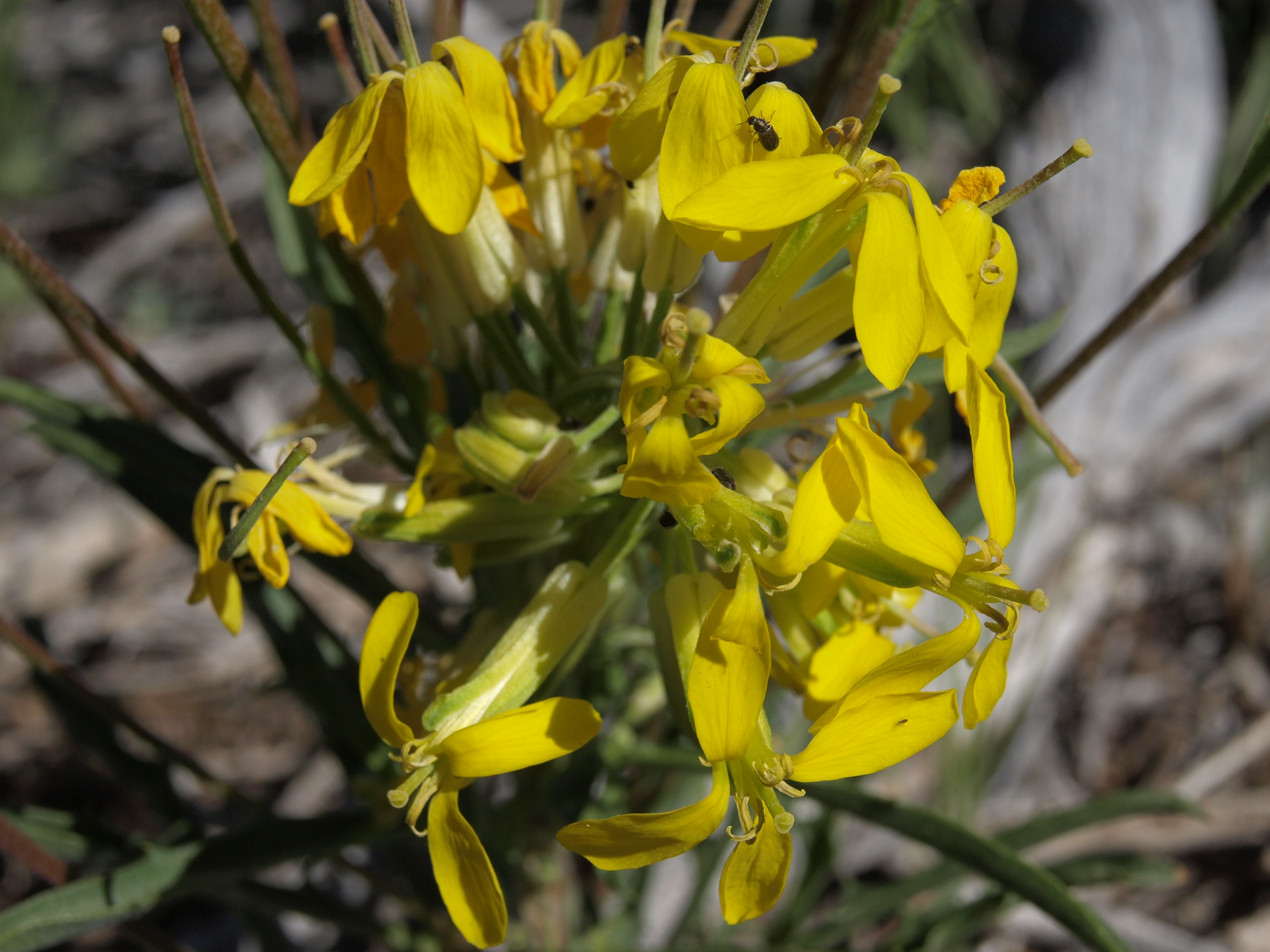
Western wallflower (Erysimum capitatum)

The mustard family (Brassicaceae) has broad-seeded rock-cress (Arabis platysperma) growing to 12,000 feet (3,700 m). Lemmon's draba, (Draba lemmonii), is hairy and mat forming, and covered in clusters of lemon yellow flowers that may look like patches of lichens from a distance, since it grows in rock crevices and rock ledges. Its leaves are hairy, but are greener than the typical gray wooly leaves of many alpine plants. Western wallflower (Erysimum capitatum), a biennial or short-lived perennial, grows to 13,000 feet (4,000 m), and is also found in most other plant communities.

Pink family (Caryophyllaceae) member nuttall's sandwort (Minuartia nuttallii)) is a ground hugging mat with short, needle like leaves. Sargent's campion (Silene sargentii) is found in rock crevices to 12,000 feet (3,700 m) or 12,500 feet (3,800 m).

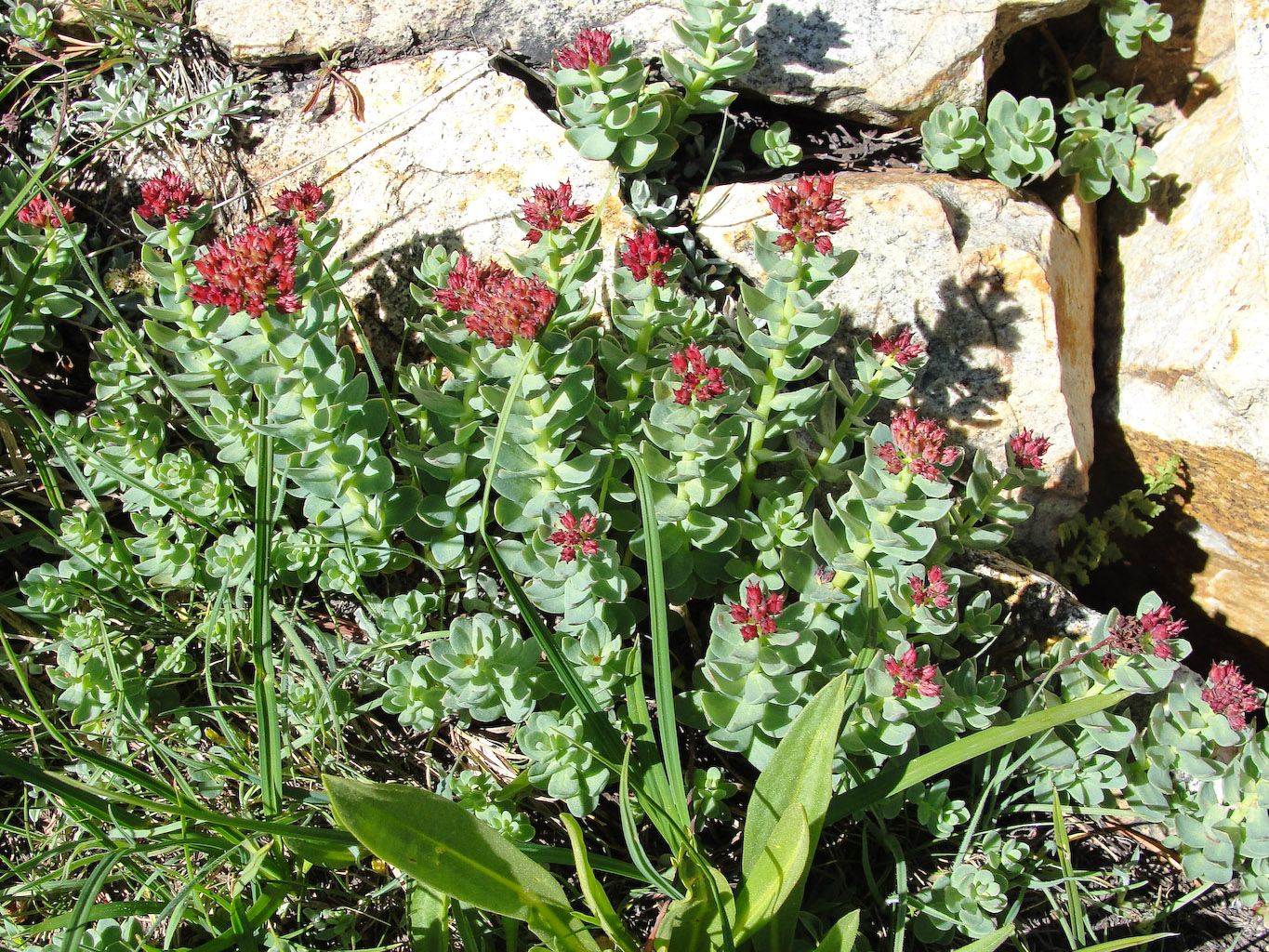
Rosy sedum (Rhodiola integrifolia)

Rosy sedum (Rhodiola integrifolia), in the stonecrop family (Crassulaceae), has fleshy, moisture retaining leaves. Also fleshy is western roseroot (R. roseum supbsp. inegrifolium), found up to 13,000 feet (4,000 m) in moist, rocky places. Its stems grow in such profusion that it appears to be a shrub, but it is not since it is not woody.

The legume family (Fabaceae) includes balloon milkvetch (Astragalus whitneyi), a spreading or erect perennial with papery balloon like seedpods, filled with air. The mat forming perennial or subshrub, Brewer's lupine (Lupinus breweri), is well adapted to the alpine zone, low growing, with hairy silver leaves that reflect the intense alpine sunlight and trap air to reduce the drying effects of constant winds. Alpine lupine, or dwarf lupine (Lupinus lepidus), has several semi-prostrate stems. Carpet clover (Trifolium monanthum) is found in moist, grassy places up to 12,500 feet (3,800 m). King's clover (Trifolium kingii) grows on open slopes.

Alpine gentian (Gentiana newberryi)

Explorer's gentian (Gentiana calycosa), in the gentian family (Gentianaceae), is one of the more conspicuous moist alpine meadow flowers, with deep blue 1 inch (2.5 cm) bell-shaped flowers, and found as high as 13,000 feet (4,000 m), in meadows and on stream banks. Alpine gentian (Gentiana newberryi) is a late bloomer of the alpine zone, sometimes to early fall, growing from a basal rosette with stems lying on the ground (decumbent), and occurring in moist meadows as high as 13,000 feet (4,000 m).

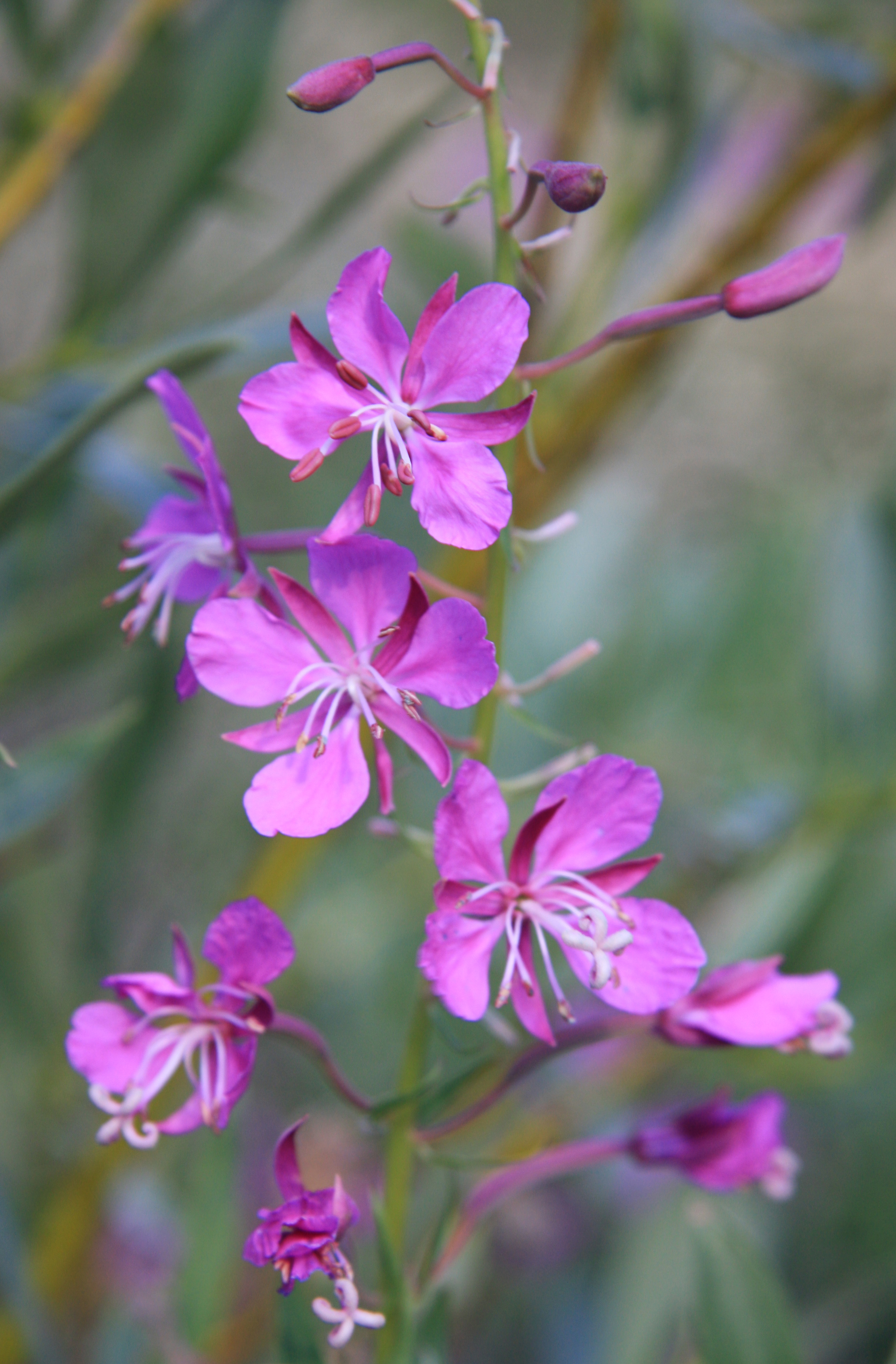
Fireweed (Chamerion angustifolium)

Fireweed (Chamerion angustifolium), in the evening primrose family (Onagraceae), is named for its flaming color. Glaucus willow herb (Epilobium glaberrimum) found up to 12,500 feet (3,800 m). Rock fringe (E. obcordatum) grows on dry slopes, nestles in crevices and peaks out from behind the rocks, and forms mats that sprawl across flats and edges of boulders, forming an apparent bright fringe on the edge of moist rocky ledges. Growing to 12,000 feet (3,700 m) is diffuse gayophytum (Gayophytum diffusum).

Ladies Tresses (Spiranthes romanzoffiana)is a sweetly fragrant orchid family (Orchidaceae) member with a spiral of flowers.

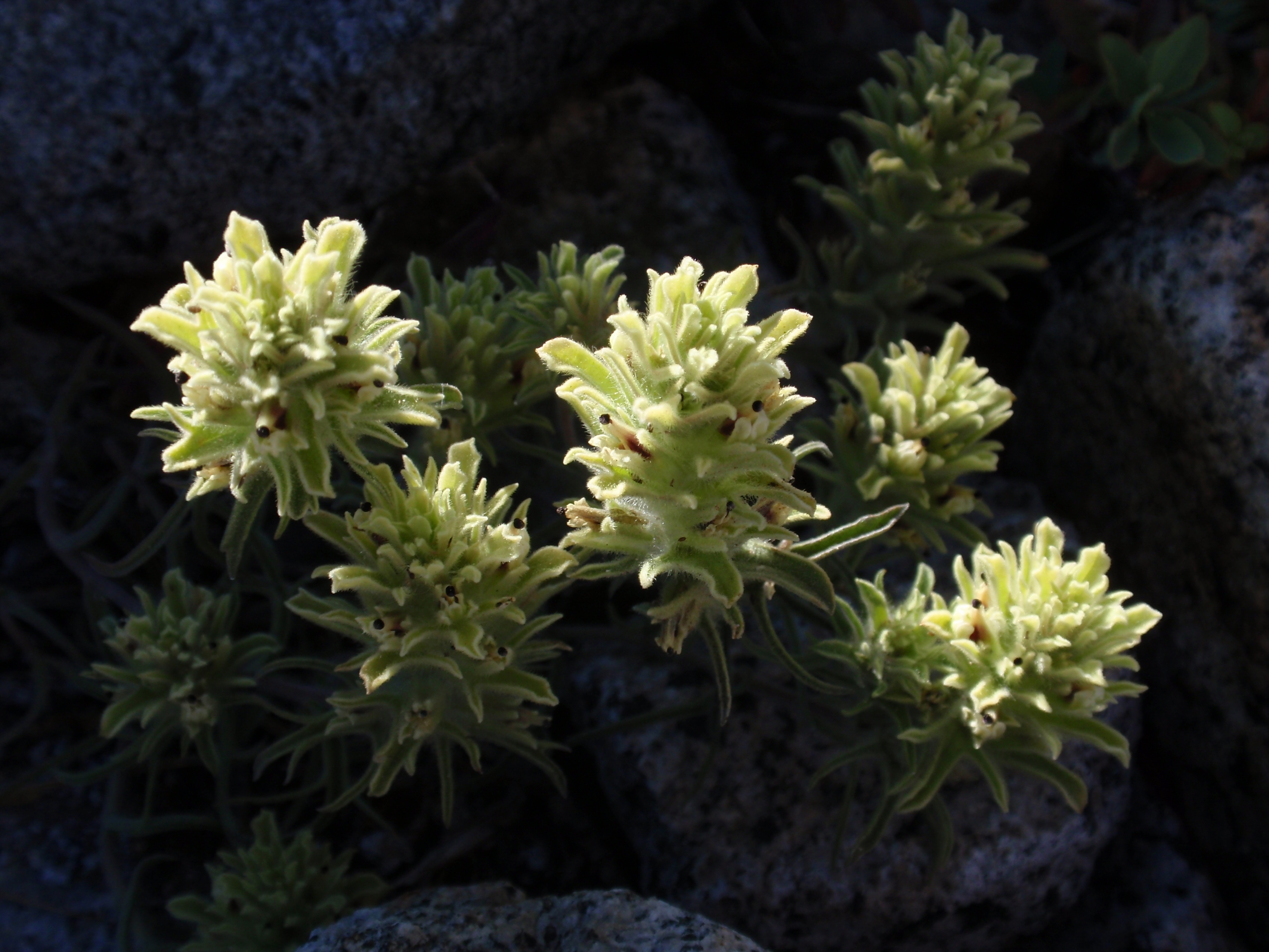
Alpine paintbrush (Castilleja nana)

Lemmon's paintbrush (Castilleja lemmonii), in the broomrape family (Orobanchaceae), is found in alipine meadows or dry, rocky places to 12,000 feet (3,700 m). Dwarf alpine Indian paintbrush (Castilleja nana) grows in dry alpine barrens to 12,000 feet (3,700 m), exhibiting the small size characteristic of alpine flora, with several short erect stems typically less than 4 inches (10 cm), rarely reaching 6 inches (15 cm). Little elephants head (Pedicularis attollens) grows as short as 2 inches (5.1 cm) and to elevations of 13,000 feet (4,000 m). Elephant's head (Pedicularis groenlandica)is as short as 3 inches (7.6 cm) and can be found up to 12,000 feet (3,700 m).

The poppy family (Papaveraceae) has steer's head (Dicentra uniflora) and few-flowered bleeding heart (D. pauciflora), each growing to 12,000 feet (3,700 m).

In the alpine zone, the lopseed family (Phrymaceae) has an occasional mat-forming primrose monkeyflower (Mimulus primuloides), which has been found in a wide range of elevations, from 2,000 to 11,000 feet (610 to 3,350 m).

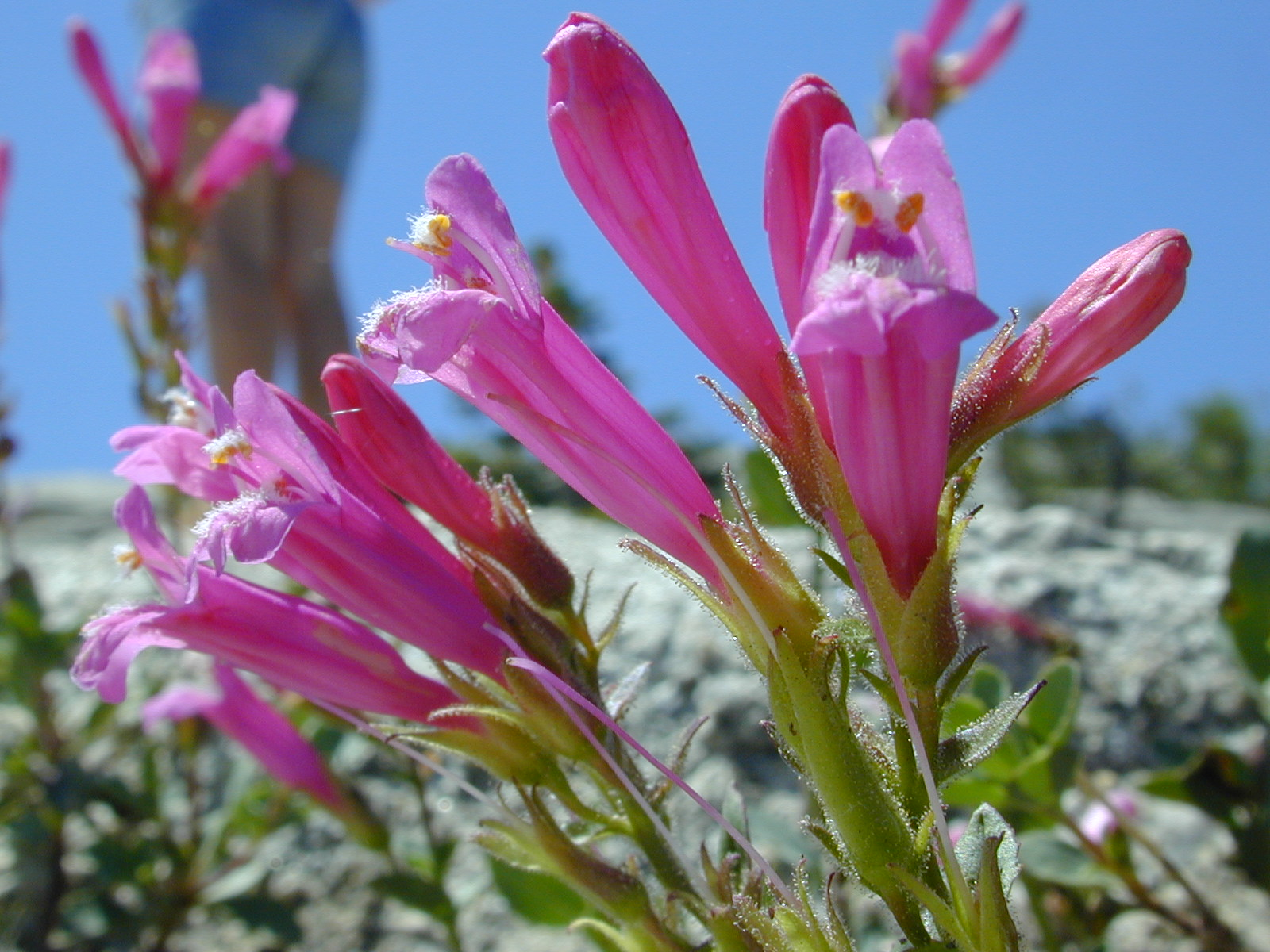
Mountain pride (Penstemon newberryi)

In the plantain family (Plantaginaceae), Torrey's few-eyed Mary (Collinsia torreyi) can be found as high as 13,000 feet (4,000 m). Davidson's penstemon, or creeping penstemon (Penstemon davidsonii), is a perennial spreading mat, with several spreading flower stems. The tubular blossoms are longer than the stems of the dwarfed plant that supports them. (Penstemon heterodoxus) can be as small as 2 inches (5.1 cm), but usually forms mats to 8 inches (0.20 m), ranging to 12,000 feet (3,700 m) elevation. John Muir's favorite wildflower, mountain pride (Penstemon newberryi), "carpets granite slopes with brilliant pink flowers". Showy penstemon (Penstemon speciosus)) is a spreading perennial. American alpine speedwell (Veronica wormskjoldii) is an erect perennial that grows near moist streambanks and lakeshores from an underground stem (rhizome).

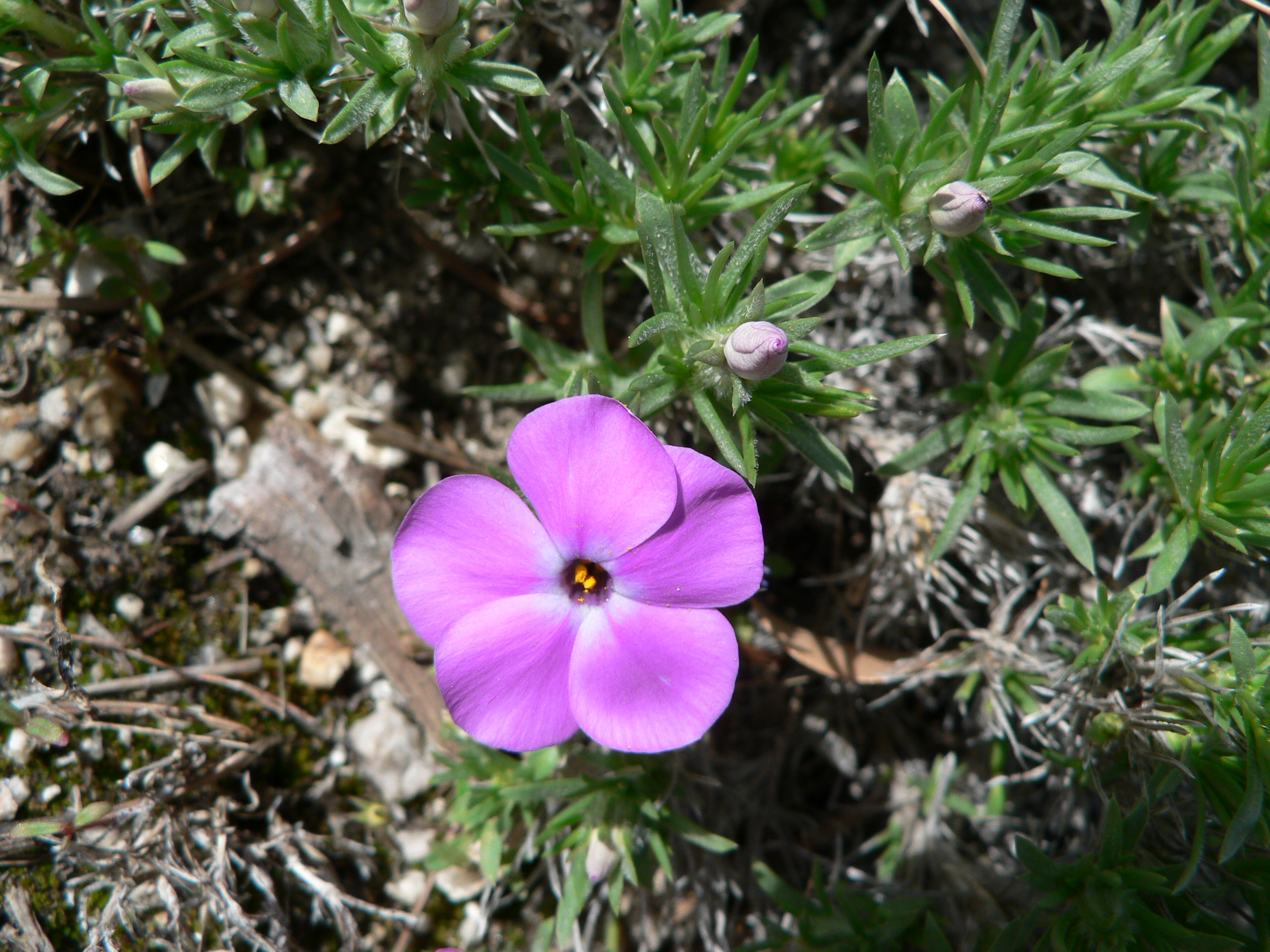
Spreading Phlox (Phlox diffusa)

Phlox family (Polemoniaceae) perennials include dwarf phlox, or cushion phlox (Phlox condensata), which forms dense cushions plant with tiny branchlets only 1 inch (0.025 m) long, tiny leaves only 0.2 inches (0.0051 m) long and well adapted to resist the high winds, and flowers forming a nearly solid floral blanket of the underlying plant. Spreading phlox (Phlox diffusa) is a matted perennial with sprawling stems. At very high-elevations is sky pilot (Polemonium eximium), which has tightly pinnate leaves similar to mousetail (Ivesia shockleyi), and can be found growing on talus and rocky outcrops on lofty peaks to 13,800 feet (4,200 m). "With its dramatic beauty", sky pilot is "thought to be one of the finest and most beautiful Sierra wildflowers". Showy polemonium (Polemonium pulcherrimum) grows in most Sierra Nevada habitats, and has tightly pinnate leaves with leaflets reminiscent in appearance to the armored tail of a stagasaurus dinosaur.

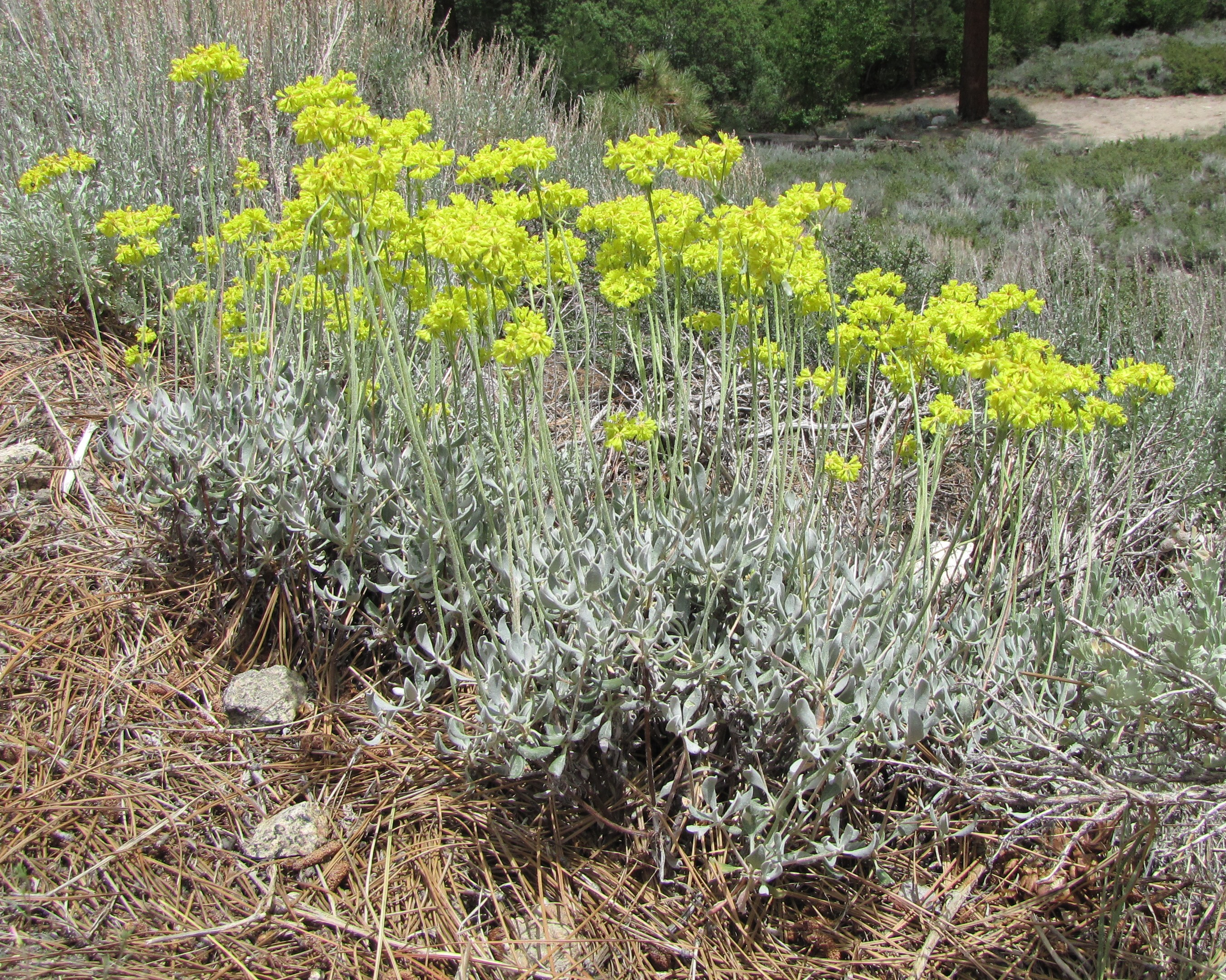
Sulphur buckwheat (Eriogonum umbellatum)

Buckwheat family (Polygonaceae) perennials include lady's thumb (Bistorta bistortoides), a perennial growing from a contorted rhizome (underground stem). Butterballs, or oval-leaved buckwheat (Eriogonum ovalifolium), has leaves that cluster very tightly forming almost impenetrable mats or cushions on sandy or gravelly flats and in rocky soils, and grows to 12 inches (0.30 m) or 13,000 feet (4,000 m) elevation. Frosted wild buckwheat (E. incanum) is densely covered with white hairs so as to appear "frosted", and grows to 13,000 feet (4,000 m) elevation. Lobb's wild buckwheat (E. lobbii), growing to 12,000 feet (3,700 m), is sprawling and grows from a thick, woody stem, with flower stalks lying on the ground.

Another buckwheat family member found growing in 13 named varieties, from the desert floor all the way up to 12,500 feet (3,800 m), is naked stemmed eriogonum (E. nudum). There are also alpine zone varieties of the perennial to shrub sulfur flower, or sulfur buckwheat (E. umbellatum), that can be found up to 11,800 feet (3,600 m) to 12,000 feet (3,700 m) elevation. Alpine sorrel (Oxyria digyna) grows in crevices in cliffs and other rocky places to 13,000 feet (4,000 m). It is unusual among alpine plants in that it has leaves that are relatively large, broad, and hairless (and edible, with a tangy-tart taste - "oxyria" meaning "sour").

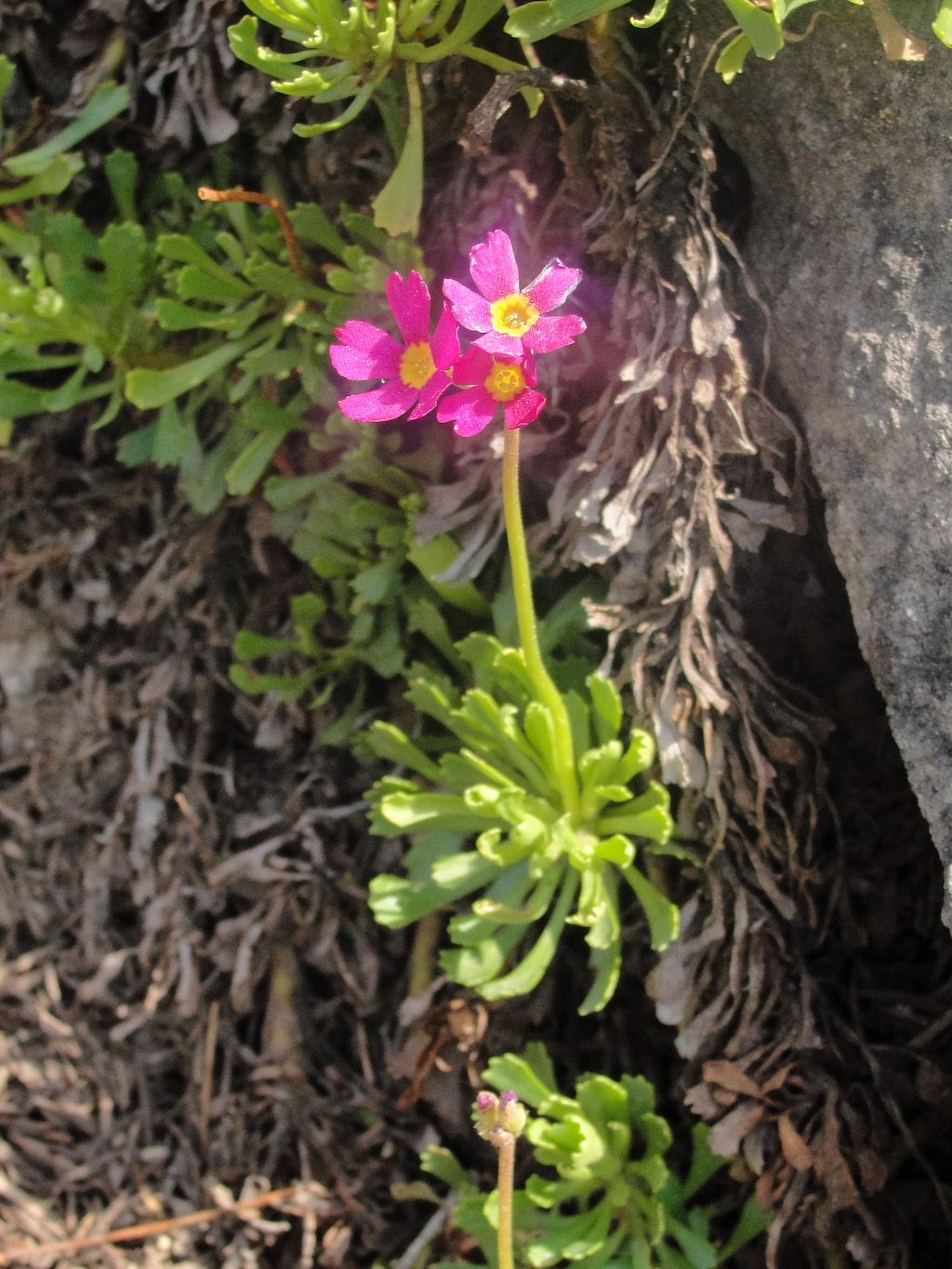
Sierra primrose (Primula suffrutescens )

The primrose family (Primulaceae) has the alpine shooting star (Dodecatheon alpinum), also found at lower elevation zones, and found near stream and lake sides. Also sierra primrose, (Primula suffrutescens ), considered by photographers to be one of the most spectacular alpine flowers, forms large mats around rocks and is covered with rose petals, similar to rock fringe (Epilobium obcordatum). It tends to grow on north facing slopes were there is moisture from melting snow.

In the purslane family (Portulacaceae) is dwarf lewisia, or alpine lewisia (Lewisia pygmaea), considered by some to be "one of the most beautiful and intriguing of the alpine floral treats", is found in higher elevation basins and slopes, from 1,700 to 4,020 metres (5,580 to 13,190 ft) all the way up to 14,000 feet (4,300 m). Botanist Laird Blackwell describes the growth pattern of its fleshy leaves and colonies as "its basal leaves form amazing patterns on the ground like many-armed starfish reaching for the sky... this is a plant that begs for a long look and close examination regardless of where it happens to be in its blooming cycle."

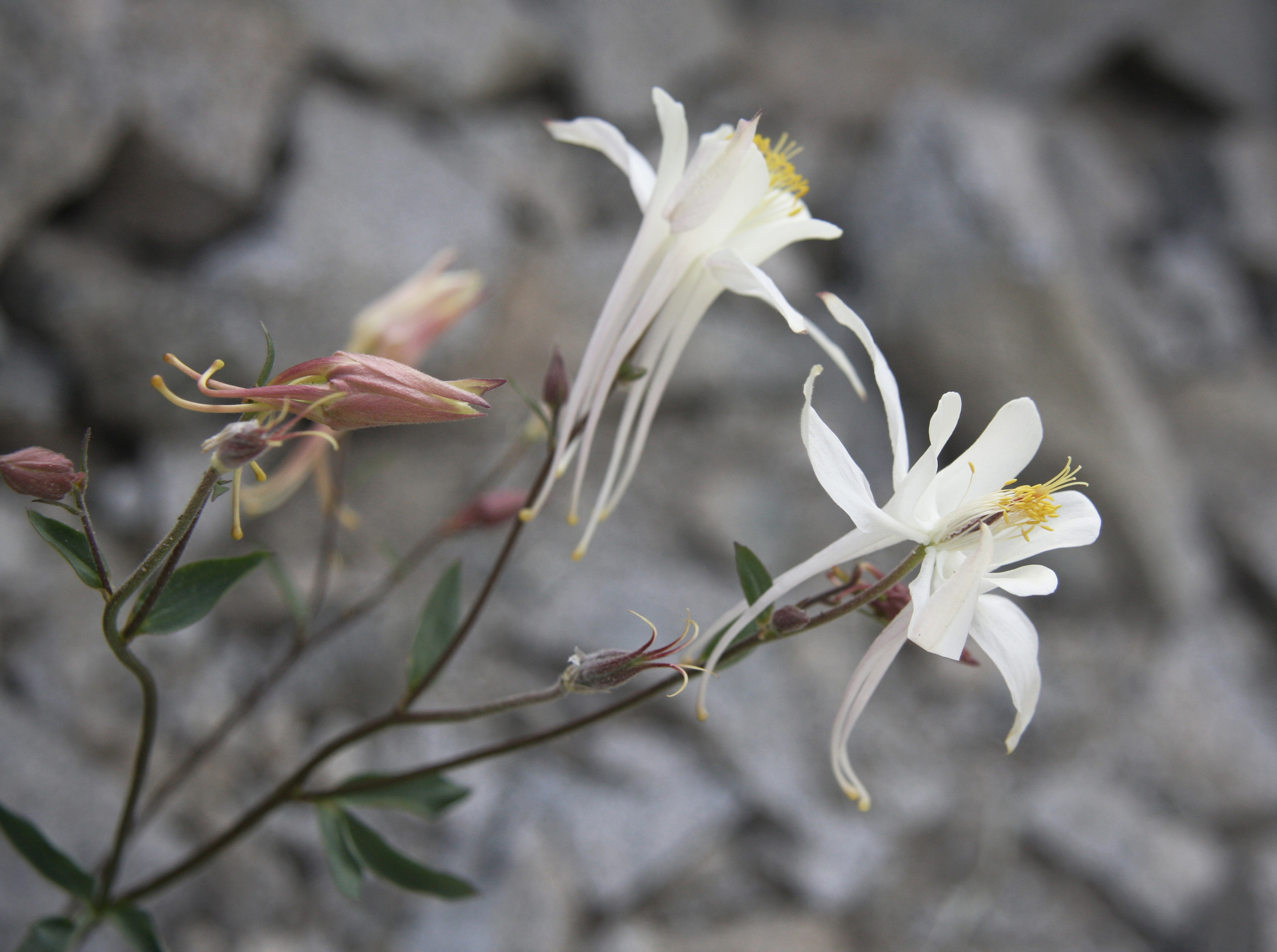
Sierra columbine (Aquilegia pubescens)

The buttercup family (Ranunculaceae) has Drummond's anemone (Anemone drummondii), a showy perennial. Alpine columbine, or sierra yellow columbine (Aquilegia pubescens), "among the most spectacular eastern sierra flowers", grows as a 20 inches (0.51 m) or smaller cushion, to 12,000 feet (3,700 m). Unlike lower elevations, which are pollinated by hummingbirds that do not reach alpine elevations, alpine columbine is pollinated by moths, so are upright and totally ultraviolet reflecting white. Mountain larkspur (Delphinium glaucum) grows in wet meadows to 12,000 feet (3,700 m). High mountain larkspur grows among willows and rocks along creeks, also up to 12,000 feet (3,700 m) elevation. Buttercups (Ranunculus) are among the earliest blooming of the alpine zone. Water plantain buttercup (Ranunculus alismifolius) grows in wet meadows and banks up to 12,000 feet (3,700 m), elevation. Alpine buttercup, or Eschscholtz's buttercup (R. eschscholtzii) can be found in rocky areas and meadows up to 13,000 feet (4,000 m) or 13,500 feet (4,100 m) elevation. Alpine buttercup is conspicuous with its bright lemon yellow flowers, which contrast with their rock environment.

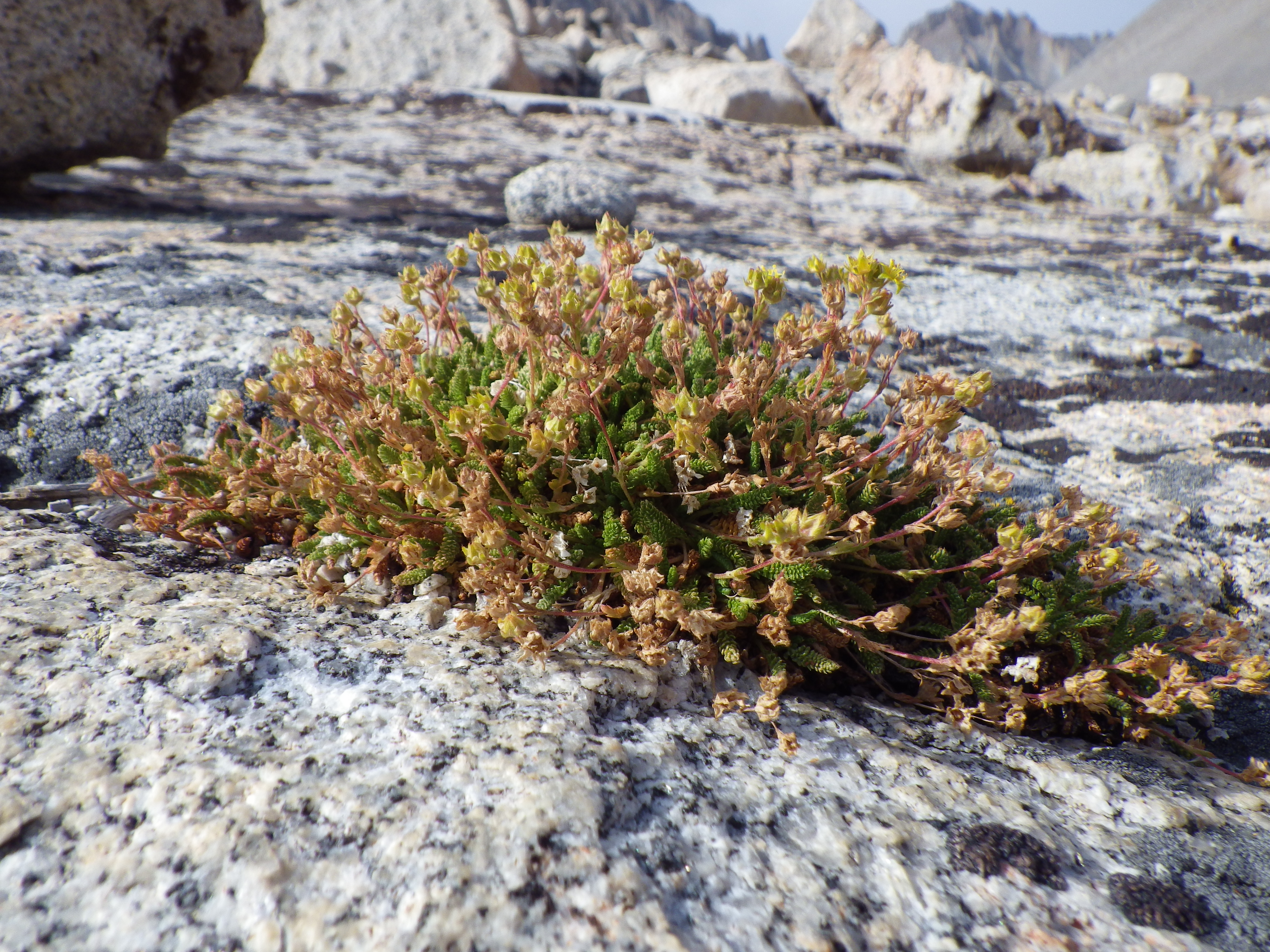
Club-moss (Ivesia lycopodioides)

Gordon's Ivesia (Ivesia gordonii) is in the rose family (Rosaceae), growing to elevations of 12,000 feet (3,700 m). It has intricate 1 to 3 inches (2.5 to 7.6 cm) leaves growing from a basal rosette, which are pinnately divided into 10-20 pairs of opposite, tiny lobed leaflets, creating the appearance of a nest of green centipedes. Club-moss (Ivesia lycopodioides) is not a moss, but a low growing perennial, with erect, but sprawling stems, growing in the crevices of rock ledges and in wet meadows. Mousetail ivesia (Ivesia santolinoides) has long silvery leaves, and grows on gravels and ridges to 12,000 feet (3,700 m). Mousetail (I. shockleyi) is a tiny herbaceous perennial. Sibbaldia (Sibbaldia procumbens) grows to 12,000 feet (3,700 m).

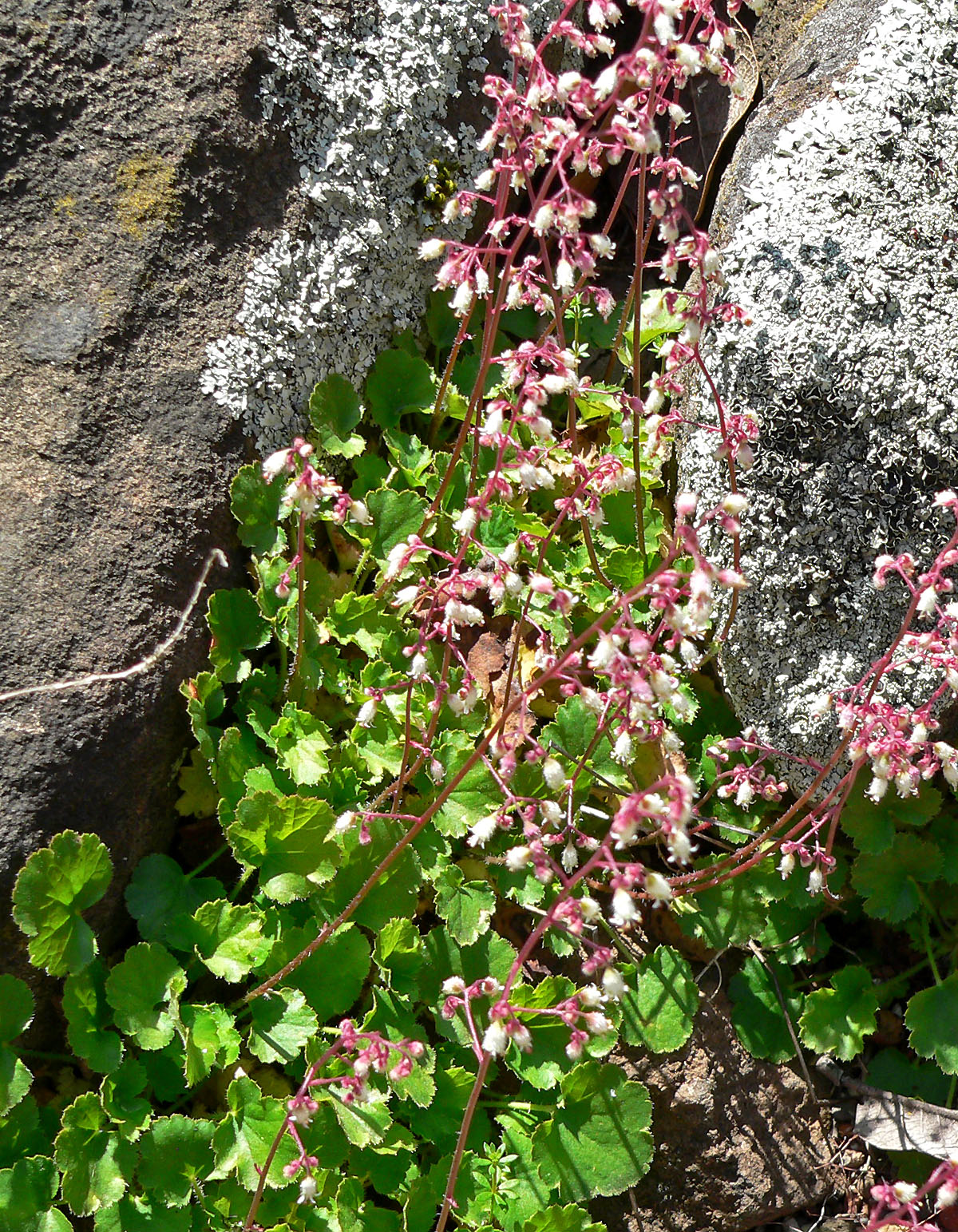
Pink heuchera (Heuchera rubescens)

Pink heuchera (Heuchera rubescens), in the saxifrage family (Saxifragaceae), is found in dry, rocky places, to 13,000 feet (4,000 m). Grass of Parnassus (Parnassia californica) forms small patches of flowers up to 13,000 feet (4,000 m). Alpine saxifrage (Saxifraga aprica) grows in wet, rocky flats and grassy meadows, in the lower alpine zone to 11,500 feet (3,500 m). Pygmy saxifrage (S. rivularis) forms small tufts 2 to 4 inches (5.1 to 10.2 cm) high, and grows in damp, shaded places under overhanging rocks, and is found from as "low" as 11,000 feet (3,400 m), to over 14,000 feet (4,300 m).

==== Perennial grasslike plants ====
Perennial grasslike plants (graminoids) constitute 21% of the Sierra Nevada alpine species.

A characteristic grass family (Poaceae) is squirreltail (Elymus elymoides). Timberline bluegrass (Poa glauca) grows in the Central and Southern Sierra Nevada from 11,000 to 13,000 feet (3,400 to 4,000 m).

Sierra sedge (Carex helleri), in the sedge family (Cyperaceae), grows on gravelly and rocky slopes up to 13,600 feet (4,100 m). A characteristic sedge family member is alpine sedge (Carex subnigricans).

Parry's rush (Juncus parryi) of the rush family (Juncaceae) grows in dry, rocky places to 12,500 feet (3,800 m).

=== Shrubs ===
Shrubs tend to be small, and low growing to cope with high wind conditions and dense snowcovering, forming mats and cushions. Woody shrubs together with annuals constitute only about 6% of the number of Sierra Nevada alpine floral species.

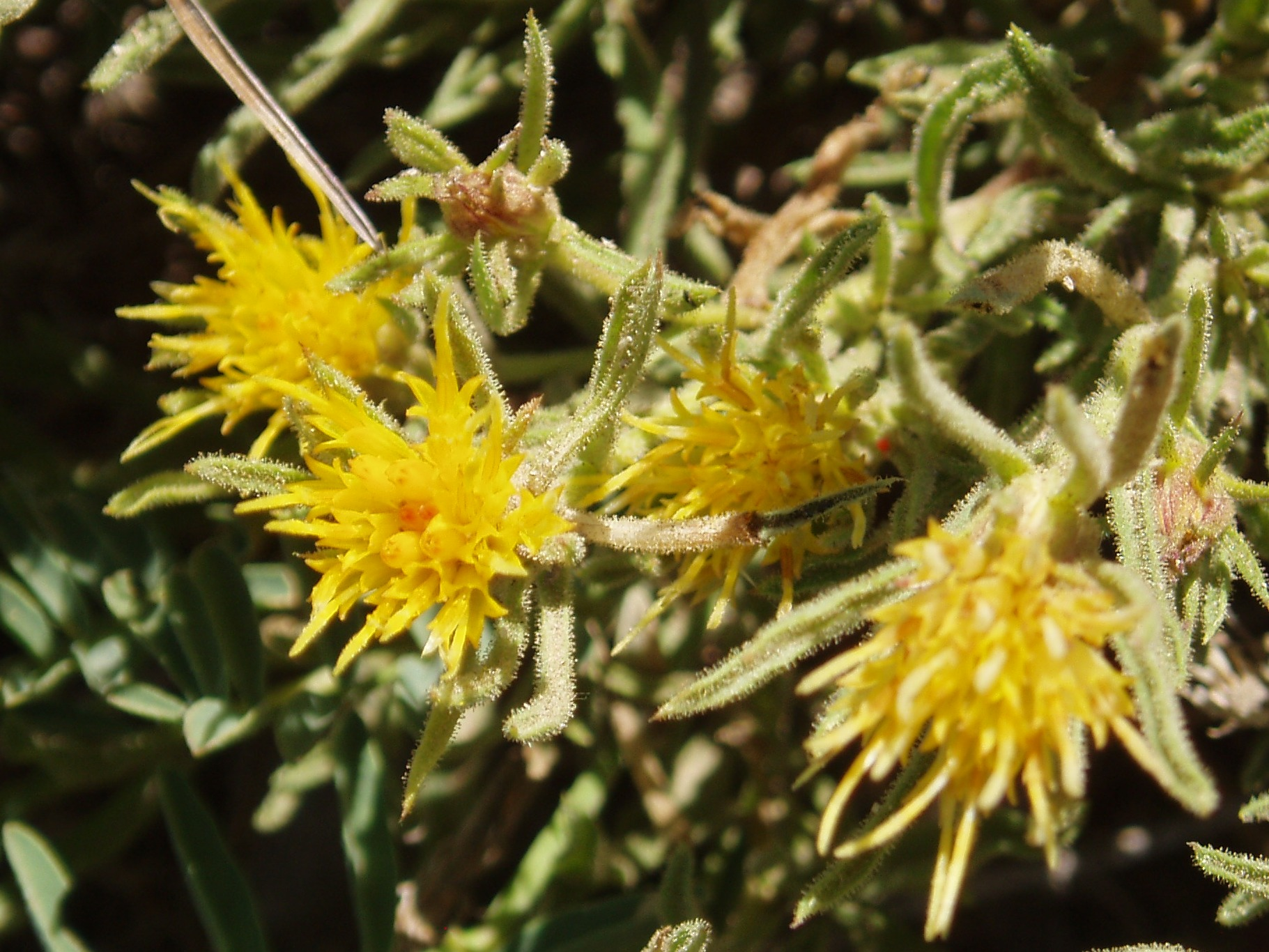
Whitestem goldenbush (Ericameria discoidea)

Whitestem goldenbush (Ericameria discoidea) is a compact woody-based shrub in the sunflower family (Asteraceae), grows on open rocky slopes to 12,000 feet (3,700 m).

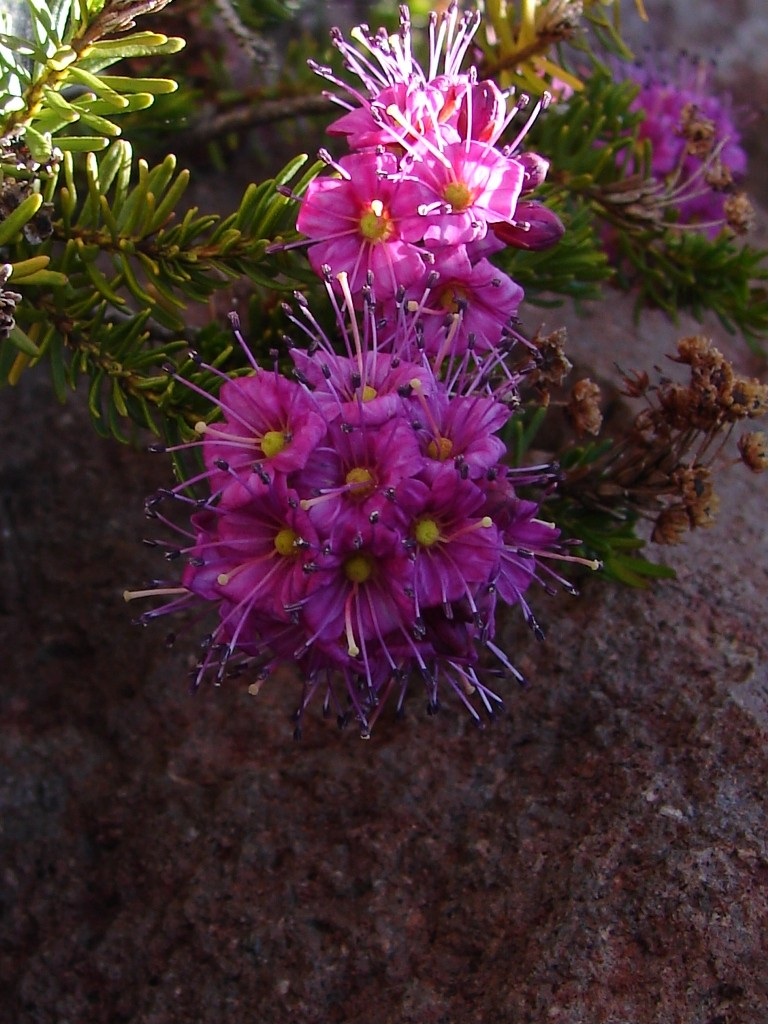
Mountain heather (Phyllodoce breweri)

In the heath family (Ericaceae), white mountain heather (Cassiope mertensiana) is 1 foot (0.30 m) tall, tiny-leaved, densely branching shrub growing on rocky ledges and in crevices up to elevations of 12,000 feet (3,700 m). Swamp laurel (Kalmia polifolia) is a low (to 8 inches (0.20 m) tall), branching, mat-forming evergreen shrub that grows in boggy alpine meadows or at the edge of water, up to 12,000 feet (3,700 m).

Also in the heath family is purple mountain heather (Phyllodoce breweri), a low-growing, highly branched, multistemmed, evergreen shrub found in moist rocky places up to about 11,500 feet (3,500 m) or 12,000 feet (3,700 m). Dwarf bilberry, or sierra bilberry (Vaccinium caespitosum), is a tufted, low growing woody plant that make a red and gold carpet around alpine lakes in the fall. The western Labrador teas (Rhododendron columbianum and R. neoglandulosum), are not for tea, but are a poisonous, rigidly branched evergreen shrubs with fragrant white flowers, growing in moist places up to 12,000 feet (3,700 m).

Mountain gooseberry (Ribes montigenum), in the gooseberry family (Grossulariaceae), can be found as high as 14,000 feet (4,300 m).

Cliffbush (Jamesia americana) is in the mock-orange family (Hydrangeaceae), and can be found to 12,000 feet (3,700 m).

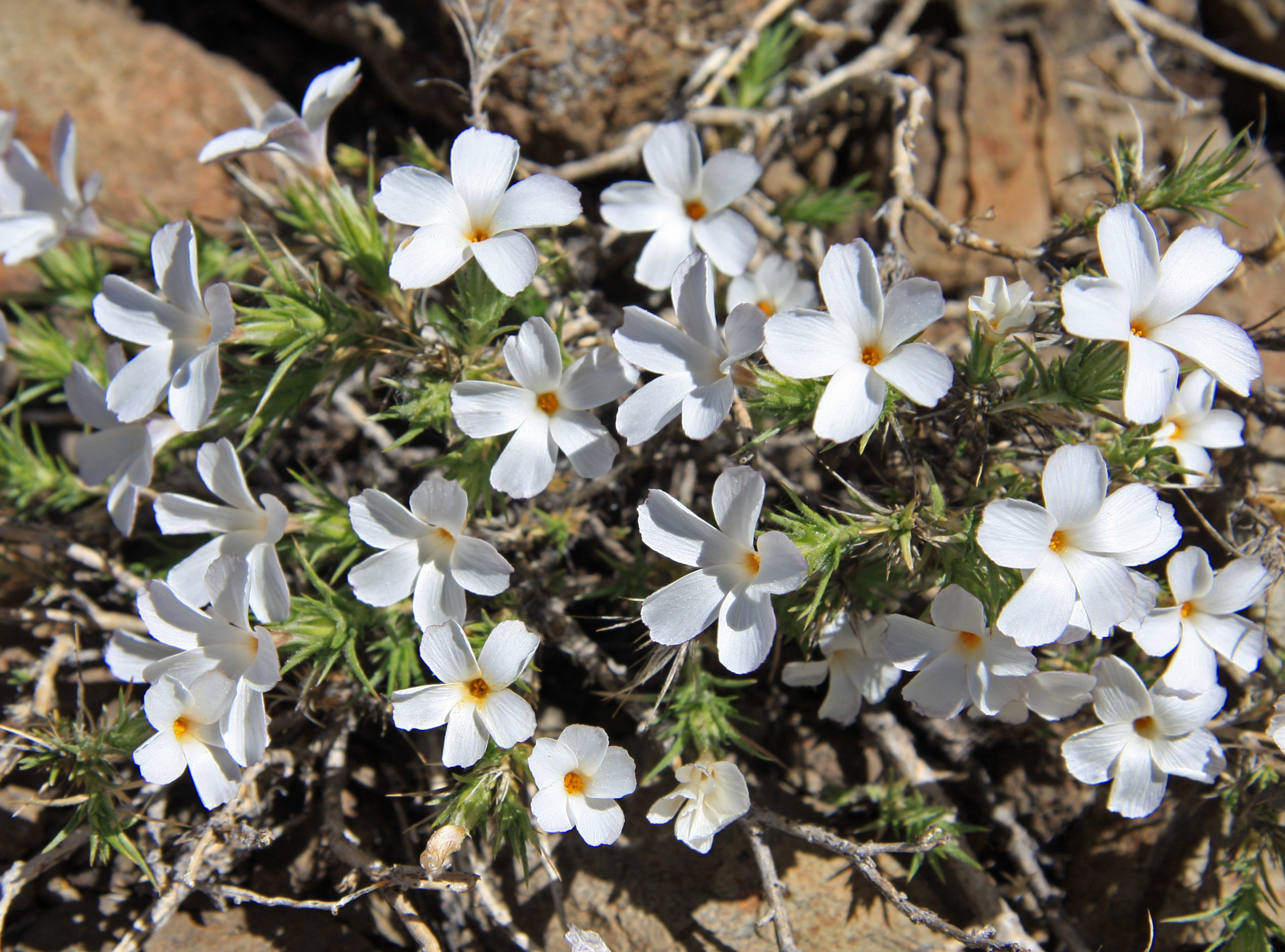
Granite gilia (Linanthus pungens)

White globe gilia, or ballhead gilia> (Ipomopsis congesta subsp. montana), in the phlox family (Polemoniaceae) grows in mats to 12,000 feet (3,700 m). Granite gilia, or prickly phlox (Linanthus pungens) is a 4 to 12 inches (10 to 30 cm) aromatic, hairy subshrub, having leaves with needle like lobes adapted to the alpine climate, that grows in a sprawling manner to elevations of 13,000 feet (4,000 m).

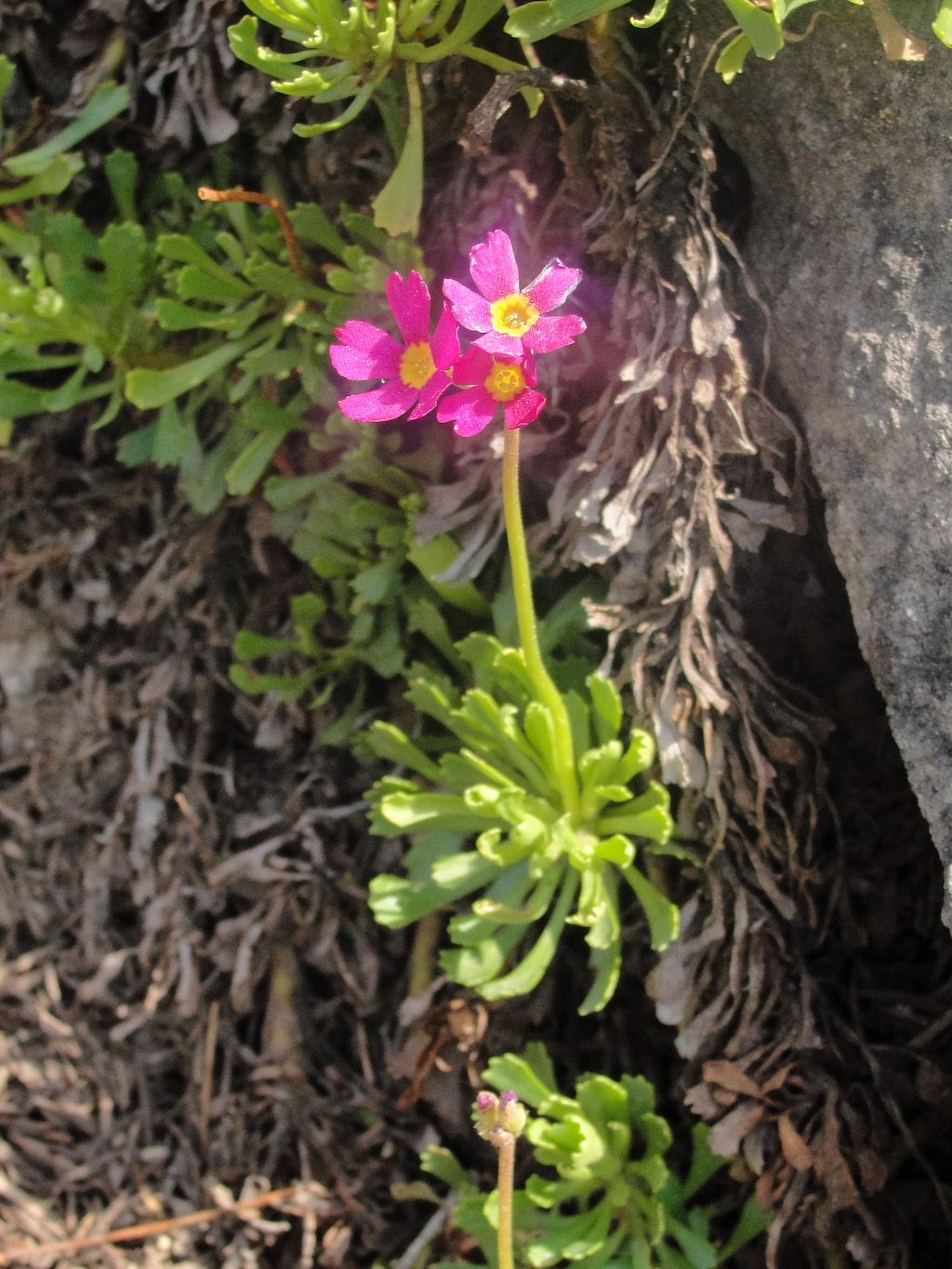
Sierra primrose (Primula suffrutescens)

Sierra primrose (Primula suffrutescens) is in the primrose family (Primulaceae), and is a sprawling, low growing subshrub found under overhanging rocks, and reaching only 5 inches (0.13 m).

Creambush (Holodiscus microphyllus), rose family (Rosaceae) member is a 1 to 3 feet (0.30 to 0.91 m) shrub found to elevations of 13,000 feet (4,000 m). Alpine Drummond's cinquefoil (Potentilla drummondii var. breweri), with smaller densely white-hairy leaves than less well adapted varieties growing below the alpine zone, grows to 12,000 feet (3,700 m). Bush cinquefoil (P. fruticosa) is found around the world in northern latitudes (circumboreal), and in the alpine zone is dwarf shrub found in moist places up to 12,000 feet (3,700 m) or 12,500 feet (3,800 m) elevation.

The mat forming Rocky Mountain willow (Salix petrophila), in the willow family (Salicaceae), grows to only 4 inches (0.10 m). Arctic willow (Salix arctica) is tiny, creeping, prostrate, and mat forming. Snow willow (Salix reticulata) occurs in alpine cirques in Mono County, CA.

=== Ferns, bryophytes, lichens, fungi, and interacting animals ===
The macrolichen flora in the Sierra Nevada alpine zone of Mount Dana, Mammoth Peak, and the ridge above Parker Pass, is not well developed compared to neighboring alpine zones in the Rocky Mountains and mountains of the Pacific Northwest.

== See also ==
- Alpine plant
- Alpine tundra
- Montane ecology
- Sierra Nevada
- Sierra Nevada subalpine zone
