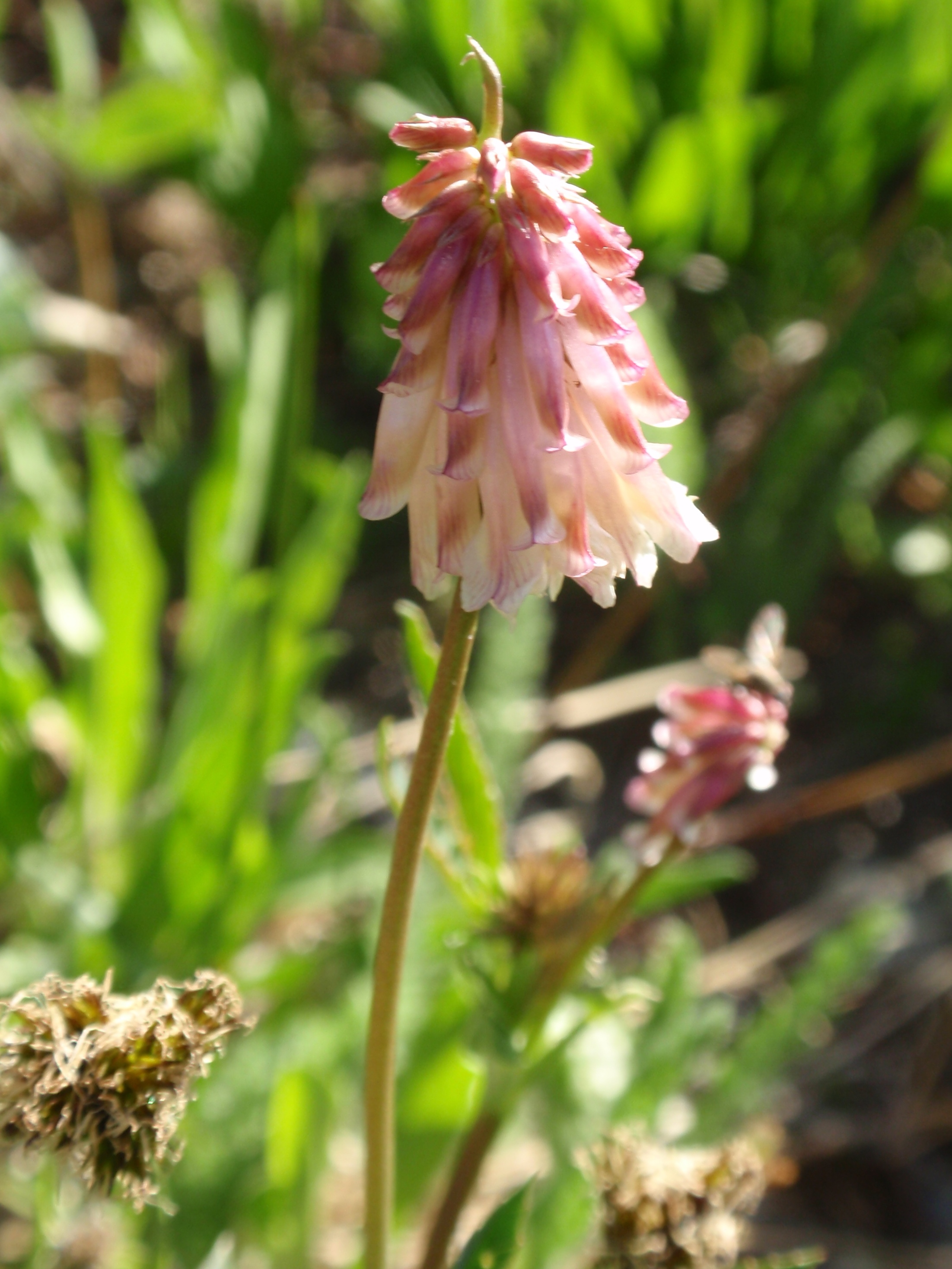

Conservation status
- Secure (NatureServe)

Scientific classification
- Kingdom: Plantae
- Clade: Tracheophytes
- Clade: Angiosperms
- Clade: Eudicots
- Clade: Rosids
- Order: Fabales
- Family: Fabaceae
- Subfamily: Faboideae
- Genus: Trifolium
- Species: T. kingii

Binomial name
- Trifolium kingii S.Watson

= Trifolium kingii =

Plant species in the pea family

Trifolium kingii, the King's clover, is a perennial species of clover in the legume family (Fabaceae).

The plant is native to the Western United States, in California, Nevada, Arizona, and Utah. It grows in the Great Basin region, and the Sierra Nevada alpine zone.
