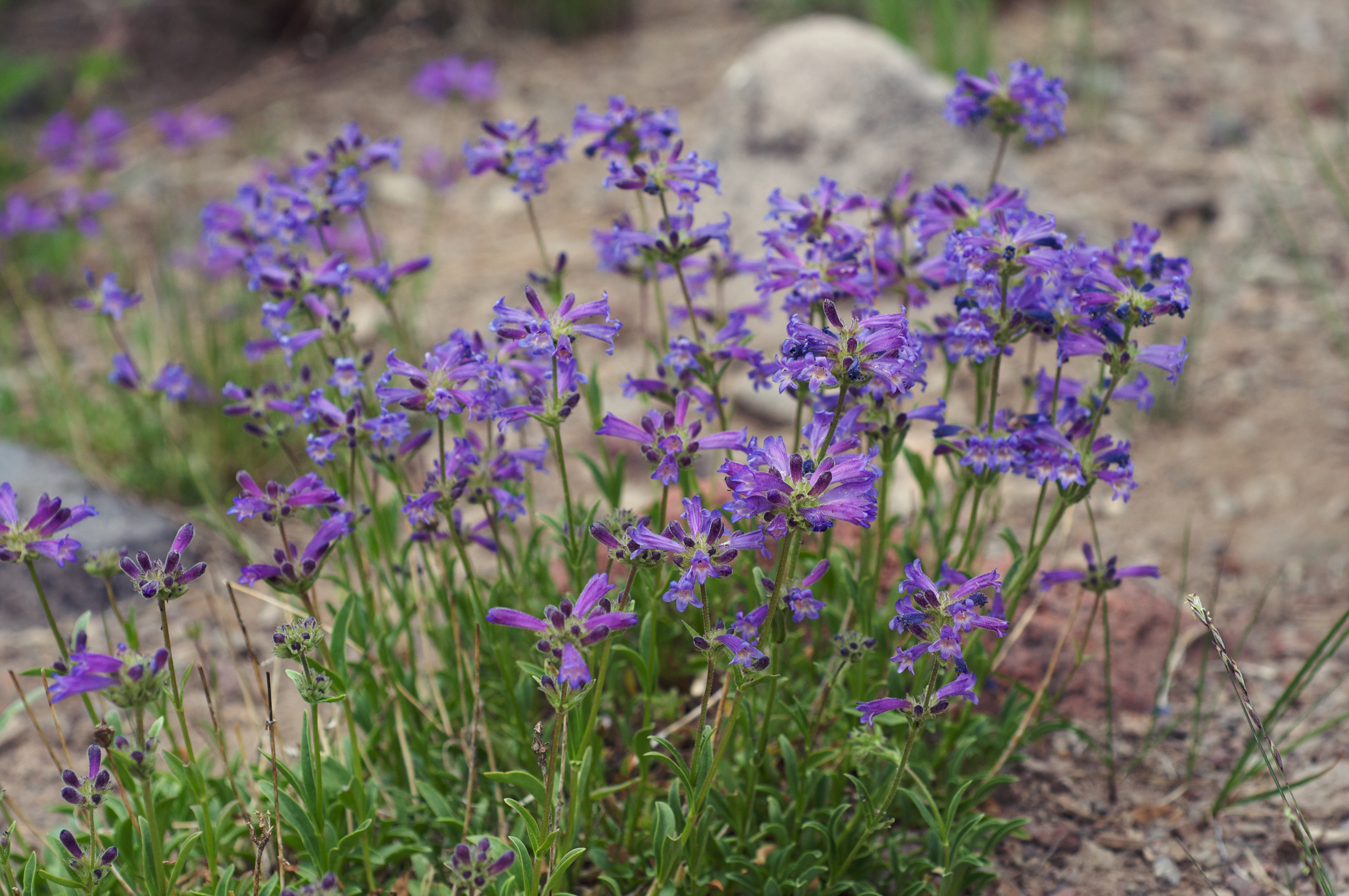

Conservation status
- Secure (NatureServe)

Scientific classification
- Kingdom: Plantae
- Clade: Tracheophytes
- Clade: Angiosperms
- Clade: Eudicots
- Clade: Asterids
- Order: Lamiales
- Family: Plantaginaceae
- Genus: Penstemon
- Species: P. heterodoxus

Binomial name
- Penstemon heterodoxus A.Gray

= Penstemon heterodoxus =

Species of flowering plant

Penstemon heterodoxus is a species of penstemon known by the common name Sierra beardtongue. It is native to California and western Nevada where it grows in several of the mountain ranges from the Klamath Mountains to the Sierra Nevada - and the slopes and plateaus to the east. It grows in subalpine and alpine climates in mountain forests, meadows and talus.

== Description ==
Penstemon heterodoxus is a perennial herb growing stems upright 65 centimeters in maximum height or in a low, spreading mat. The leaves are lance-shaped to oblong, the upper pairs sometimes clasping the stem.

The glandular inflorescence is made up of 1 to 6 separate clusters of dark purple-blue tubular flowers each just over a centimeter long. The outer surface of the flower generally has glandular hairs, and on the inside there are hairs on the floor of the flower mouth and on the staminode.
