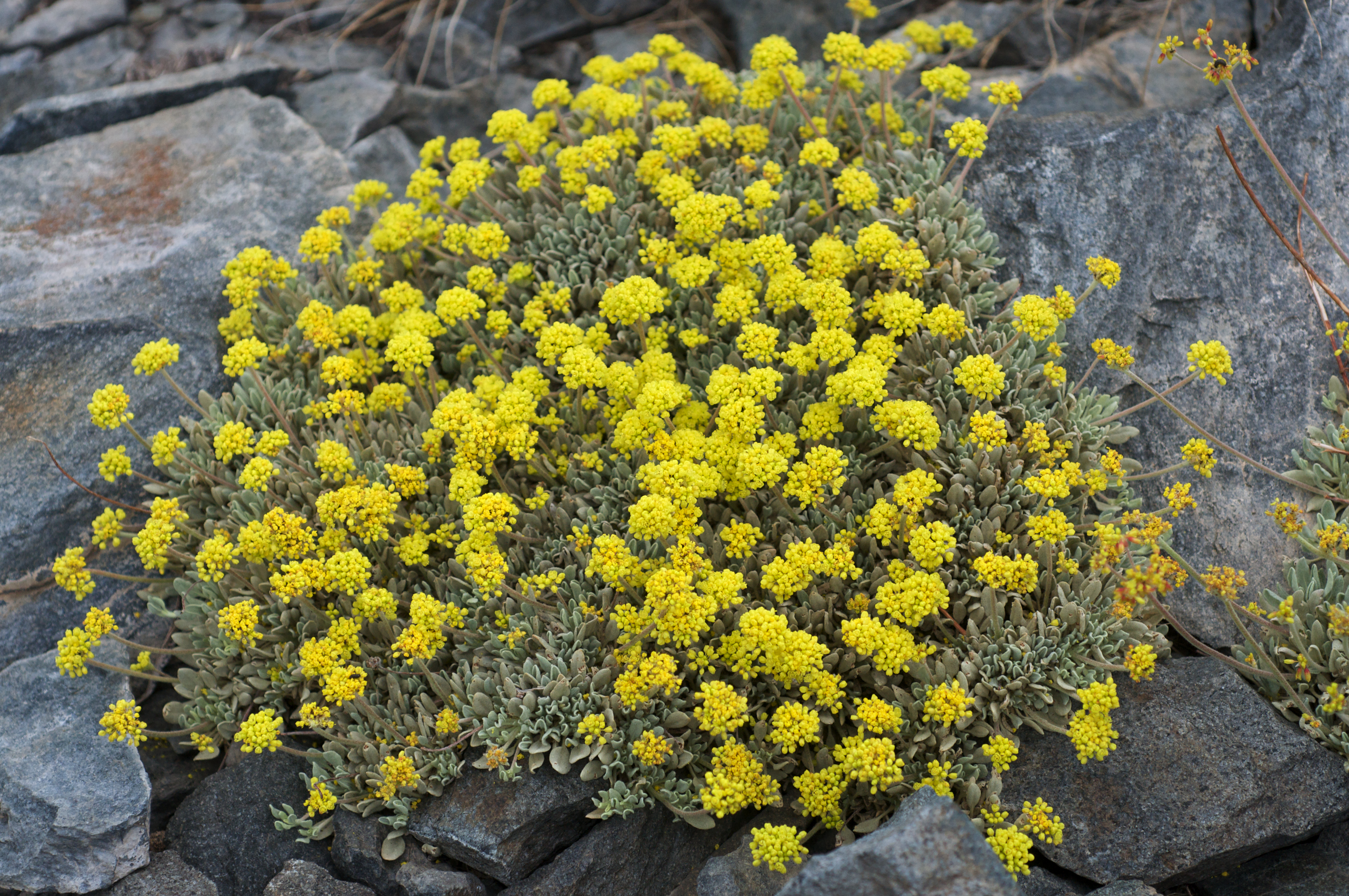

Scientific classification
- Kingdom: Plantae
- Clade: Tracheophytes
- Clade: Angiosperms
- Clade: Eudicots
- Order: Caryophyllales
- Family: Polygonaceae
- Genus: Eriogonum
- Species: E. incanum

Binomial name
- Eriogonum incanum Torr. & Gray

= Eriogonum incanum =

Species of wild buckwheat

Eriogonum incanum is a species of wild buckwheat known by the common name frosted buckwheat. It is native to the Sierra Nevada of California and extreme western Nevada. It is also known from Oregon.

== Description ==
This is a dioecious perennial herb which forms mats up to 20 centimeters tall and 30 wide, sometimes quite a bit smaller. It has clusters of woolly, petioled leaves one to two centimeters long that form a gray-green or yellowish layer on the sandy soil or among rocks.

The plant bears dense, rounded clusters of flowers, sometimes on erect stalks, that are yellow, red, or both. Male plants produce staminate flowers 2 or 3 millimeters wide, and female plants produce slightly larger pistillate flowers.
