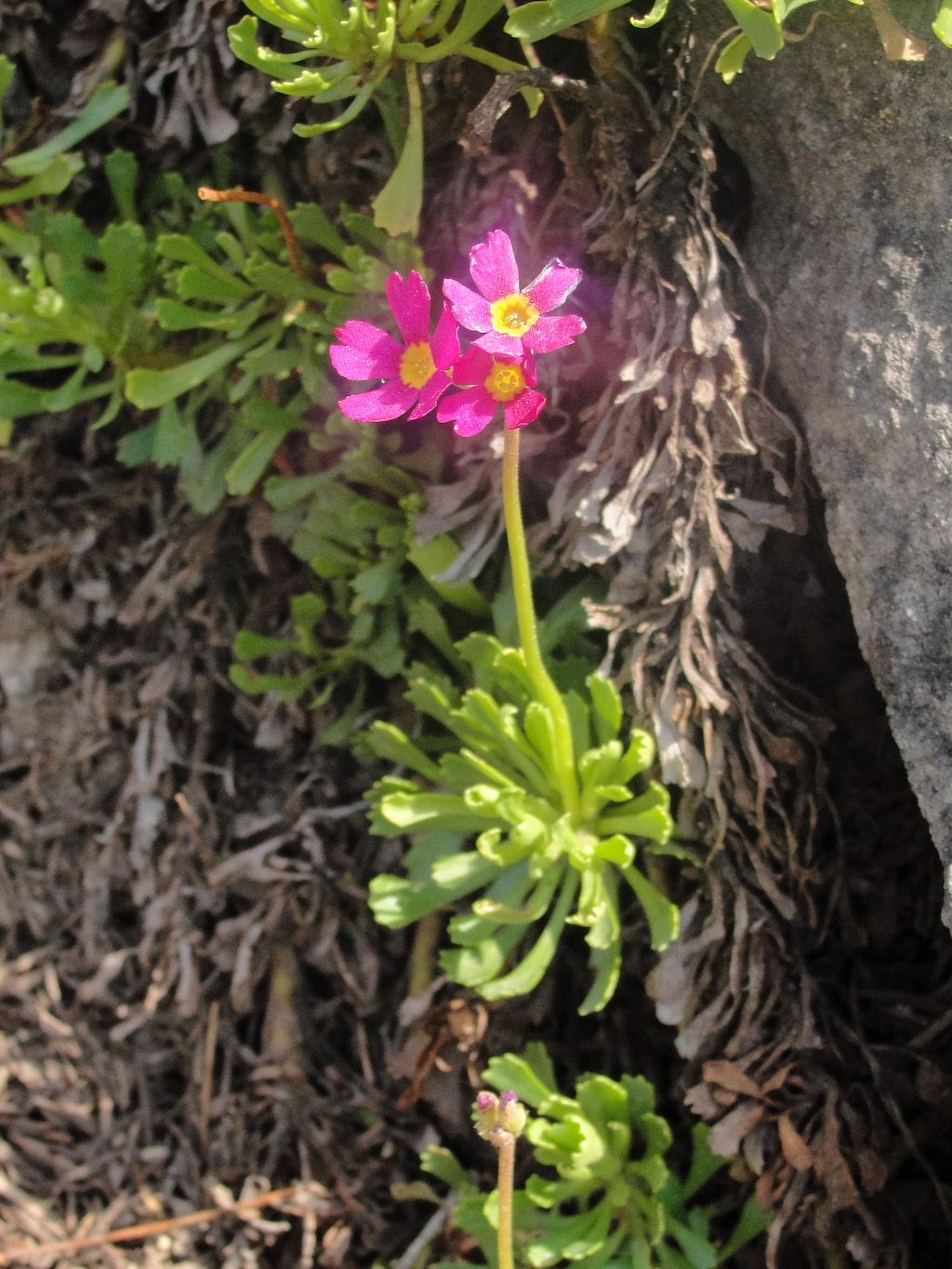

Conservation status
- Vulnerable (NatureServe)

Scientific classification
- Kingdom: Plantae
- Clade: Tracheophytes
- Clade: Angiosperms
- Clade: Eudicots
- Clade: Asterids
- Order: Ericales
- Family: Primulaceae
- Genus: Primula
- Species: P. suffrutescens

Binomial name
- Primula suffrutescens A.Gray

= Primula suffrutescens =

Species of flowering plant

Primula suffrutescens is a species of primrose known by the common name Sierra primrose.

== Description ==
With a matlike form of a thick, woody base covered in the dried remnants of previous seasons' herbage, Primula suffrutescens is a subshrub growing from a sturdy anchoring rhizome. The green leaves occur in several rosettes on the woody base. The hairless leaves are spoon-shaped with jagged, toothed tips and measure up to 3.5 centimetres (1.4 in) long.

From the rosettes arise inflorescences on peduncles up to 12 centimetres (4.7 in) tall. The showy inflorescence is an umbel of several flowers with tubular yellow throats and flat magenta corollas with five jagged or notch-tipped lobes. The fruit is a capsule.

== Distribution and habitat ==
It is endemic to California, where it grows in the high mountains of the Sierra Nevada and Klamath Ranges. It grows in rock cracks, blooming in July and August.
