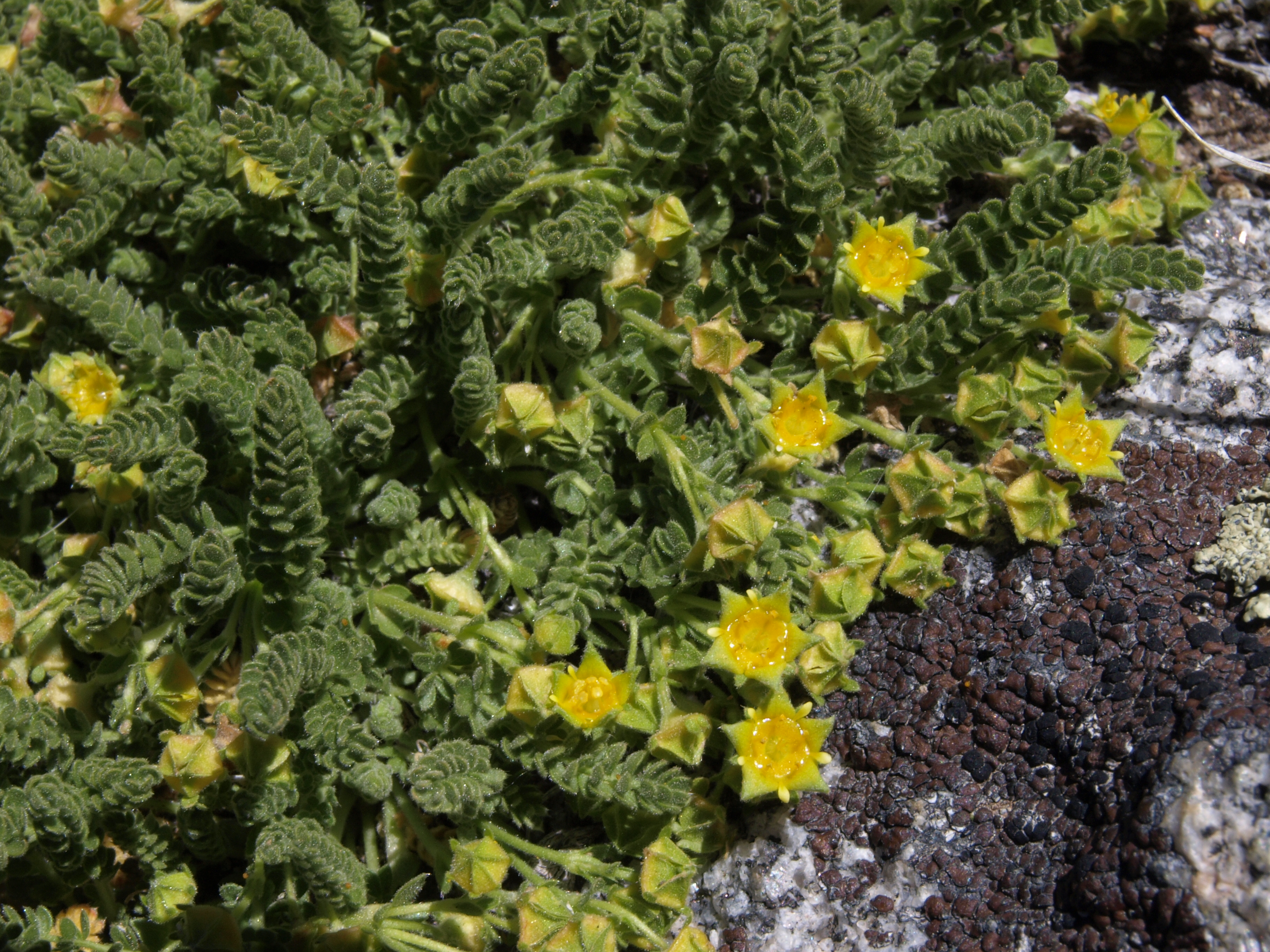
- In the White Mountains, Inyo National Forest, USA at elevation 3595 m (11800 ft)

Scientific classification
- Kingdom: Plantae
- Clade: Tracheophytes
- Clade: Angiosperms
- Clade: Eudicots
- Clade: Rosids
- Order: Rosales
- Family: Rosaceae
- Genus: Potentilla
- Species: P. shockleyi

Binomial name
- Potentilla shockleyi (S.Watson) Jeps.

Synonyms
- Horkelia shockleyi (S.Watson) Rydb.; Ivesia shockleyi S.Watson

= Potentilla shockleyi =

Species of flowering plant

Potentilla shockleyi, also known as sky mousetail, is a tiny species of herbaceous perennial plant in the rose family. It is native to the alpine zone of the Sierra Nevada mountain range in the western United States.
