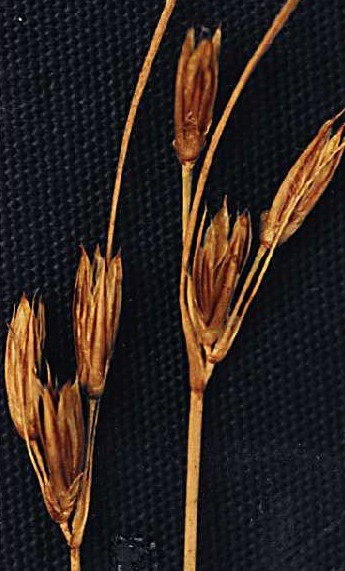

Scientific classification
- Kingdom: Plantae
- Clade: Tracheophytes
- Clade: Angiosperms
- Clade: Monocots
- Clade: Commelinids
- Order: Poales
- Family: Juncaceae
- Genus: Juncus
- Species: J. parryi

Binomial name
- Juncus parryi Engelm.

= Juncus parryi =

Species of grass

Juncus parryi is a species of rush known by the common name Parry's rush. It is native to western North America from British Columbia and Alberta to California to Colorado, where it grows in moist and dry spots in mountain habitat, including rocky talus and other areas in the subalpine and alpine climate. This is a rhizomatous perennial herb producing a dense clump of stems up to about 30 centimeters tall. There are short, thready leaves around the stem bases. The inflorescence is a cluster of flowers accompanied by a long, cylindrical bract which appears like an extension of the stem. The flower is made up of a few pointed, brown segments with membranous edges.
