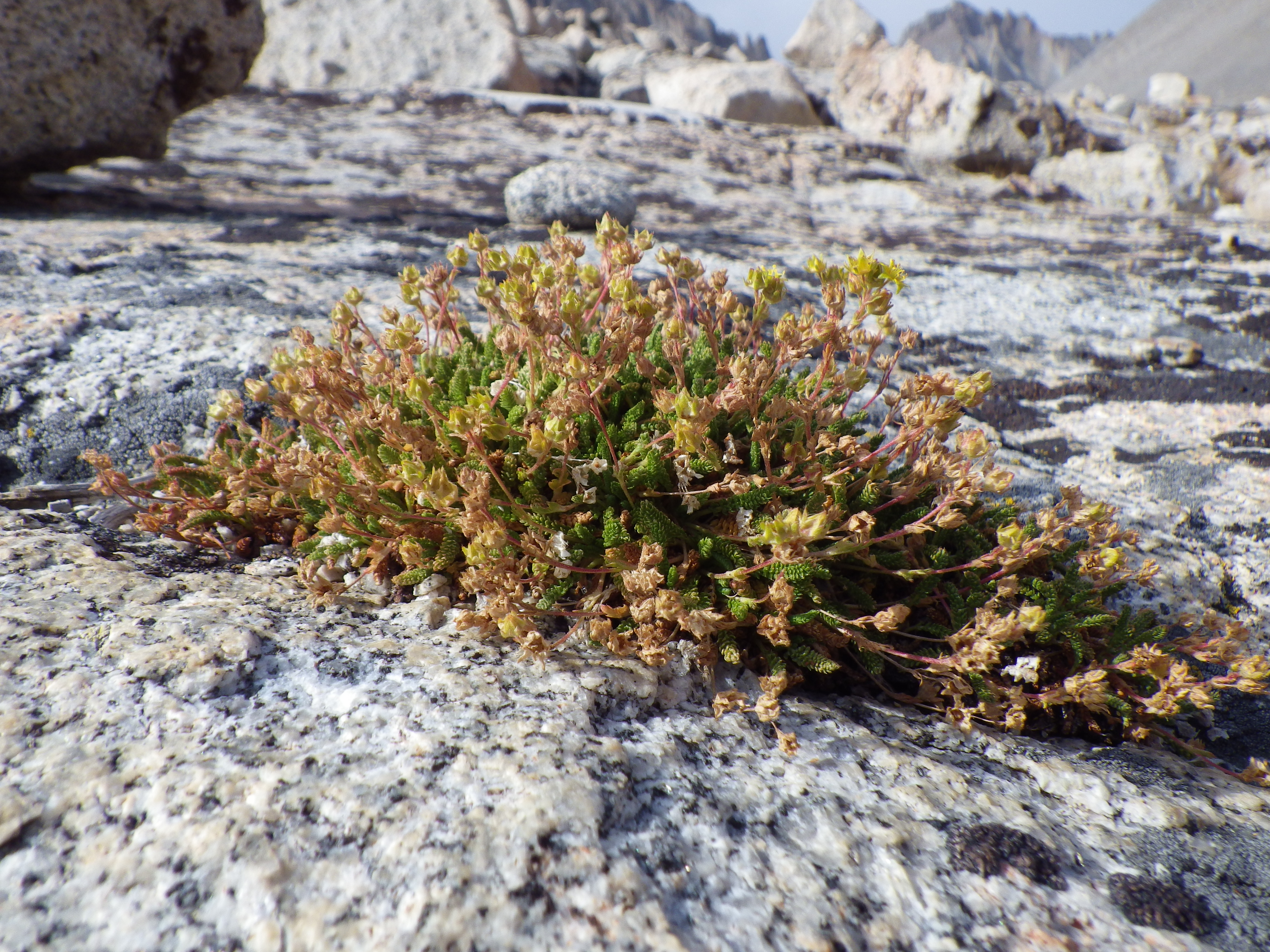

Scientific classification
- Kingdom: Plantae
- Clade: Tracheophytes
- Clade: Angiosperms
- Clade: Eudicots
- Clade: Rosids
- Order: Rosales
- Family: Rosaceae
- Genus: Potentilla
- Species: P. lycopodioides

Binomial name
- Potentilla lycopodioides (Gray) Baill. ex J.T.Howell

Synonyms
- List: Horkelia lycopodioides (A.Gray) Rydb.; Ivesia gordonii var. lycopodioides (A.Gray) S.Watson; Ivesia lycopodioides A.Gray; Ivesia lycopodioides subsp. typica D.D.Keck; Potentilla gordonii var. lycopodioides (A.Gray) Greene

= Potentilla lycopodioides =

Species of flowering plant

Potentilla lycopodioides, also known as clubmoss mousetail and clubmoss ivesia, is a species of flowering plant in the rose family. It is native to the Sierra Nevada and to regions east of the range in California. It may also be found beyond the state line into Nevada. There are three varieties recognised.

== Description ==
Potentilla lycopodioides is a perennial herb which grows in the crevices of rock ledges in the mountains and in wet high-elevation meadows. It produces a rosette of flat to cylindrical leaves up to 15 centimeters long, each of which is made up of many tiny, lobed leaflets. The stems may grow erect or drooping to 30 centimeters long and each holds an inflorescence of clustered flowers. Each flower has hairy, greenish triangular sepals and much larger oval-shaped petals of bright yellow. In the center of the flower are usually five stamens and several pistils.
