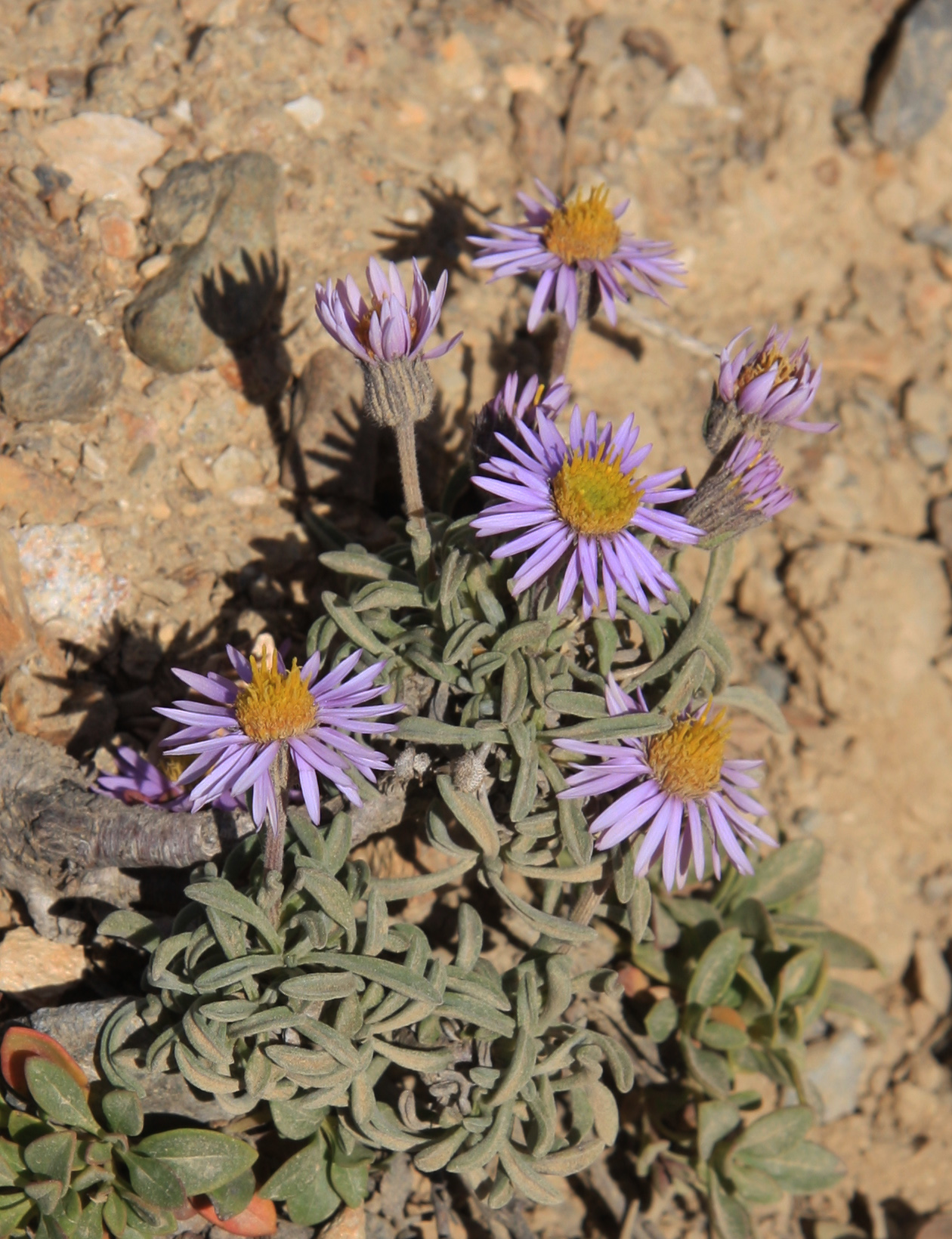

Scientific classification
- Kingdom: Plantae
- Clade: Tracheophytes
- Clade: Angiosperms
- Clade: Eudicots
- Clade: Asterids
- Order: Asterales
- Family: Asteraceae
- Genus: Erigeron
- Species: E. pygmaeus

Binomial name
- Erigeron pygmaeus (Gray) Greene

Synonyms
- Erigeron nevadensis var. pygmaeus A.Gray

= Erigeron pygmaeus =

Species of flowering plant

Erigeron pygmaeus is a species of flowering plant in the family Asteraceae known by the common name pygmy fleabane, or pygmy daisy.

Erigeron pygmaeus is native to eastern California and western Nevada, in the Sierra Nevada, the White Mountains, and a few other nearby ranges. It grows in rocky soils at high elevations in subalpine forests, flats, and talus.

Erigeron pygmaeus is a very small daisy, rarely exceeding 6 centimeters (2.4 inches) in height. It forms clumps or small mats of hairy, glandular foliage with leaves under four centimeters (1.6 inches) in length. The inflorescence consists of a single small flower head with dark phyllaries. Each head contains 20–37 blue or purple (rarely white) ray florets surrounding many golden yellow disc florets .
