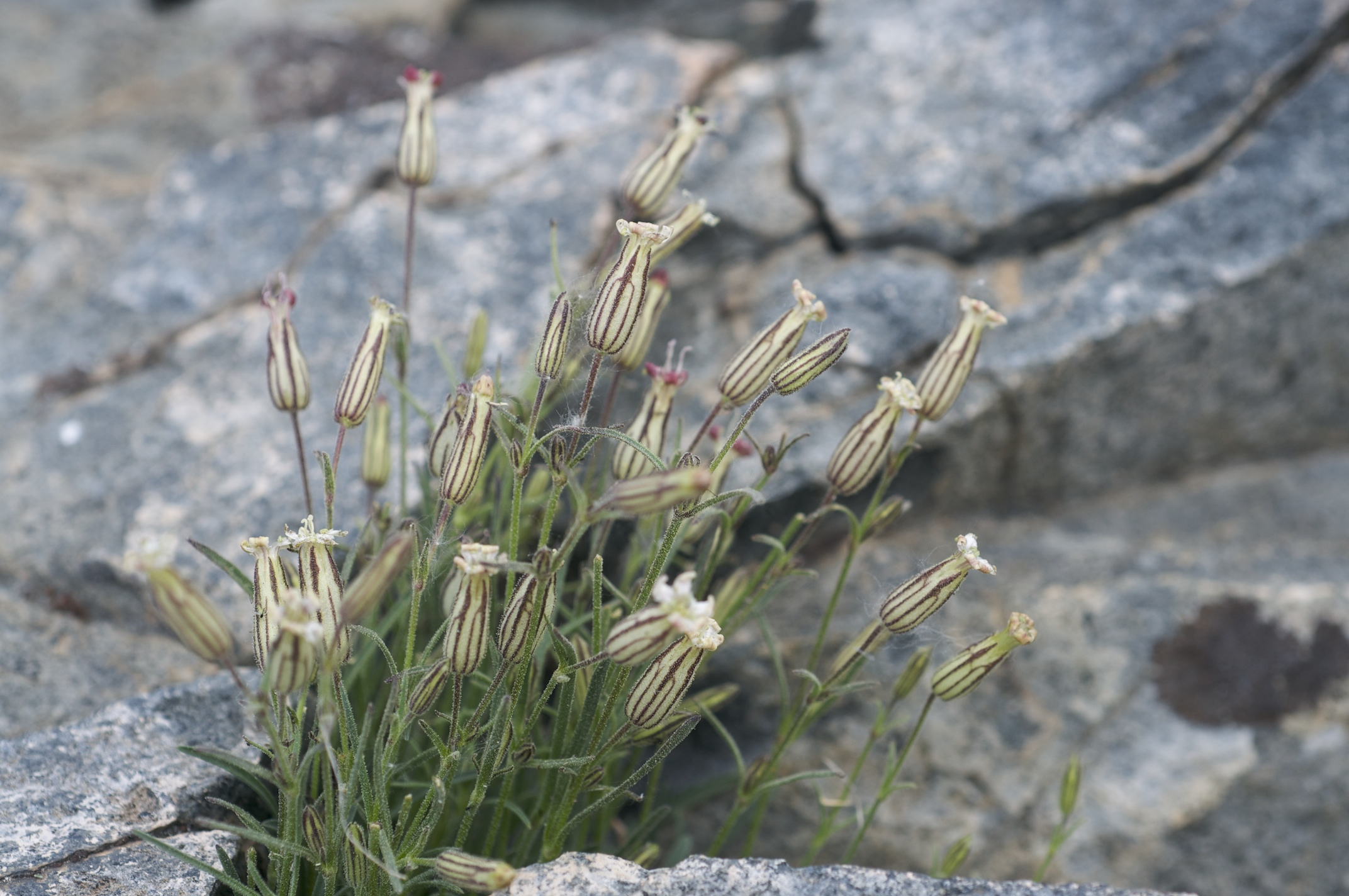

Scientific classification
- Kingdom: Plantae
- Clade: Tracheophytes
- Clade: Angiosperms
- Clade: Eudicots
- Order: Caryophyllales
- Family: Caryophyllaceae
- Genus: Silene
- Species: S. sargentii

Binomial name
- Silene sargentii S.Watson

= Silene sargentii =

Species of flowering plant

Silene sargentii is a species of flowering plant in the family Caryophyllaceae known by the common name Sargent's catchfly. It is native to the western United States, where it is known from the mountain ranges straddling the California-Nevada border east of the Sierra Nevada. It is also known from one disjunct occurrence in central Washington. It grows in rocky mountain habitat in subalpine and alpine climates. It is a perennial herb growing from a woody, branching caudex and taproot, sending up several decumbent or erect stems and shoots. It grows no more than about 20 centimeters tall, often taking a clumpy form. The fleshy leaves are widely lance-shaped and a few centimeters in length, most of them occurring around the caudex. Each flower is encapsulated in a hairy, glandular calyx of fused sepals which has stark purple veining. The petals are white to deep pink and each has two or more rounded or pointed lobes at the tip.
