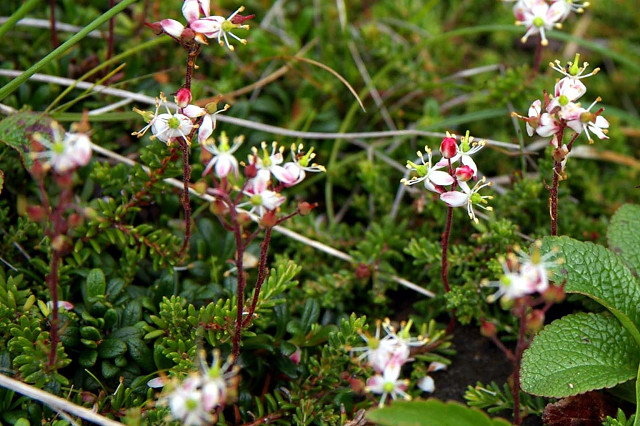
- Bryanthus gmelinii

Scientific classification
- Kingdom: Plantae
- Clade: Tracheophytes
- Clade: Angiosperms
- Clade: Eudicots
- Clade: Asterids
- Order: Ericales
- Family: Ericaceae
- Subfamily: Ericoideae
- Tribe: Bryantheae
- Genus: Bryanthus; S.G.Gmel.
- Species: B. musciformis

Binomial name
- Bryanthus musciformis (Poir.) Nakai

Synonyms
- Andromeda musciformis Poir.; Andromeda bryantha L.; Bryanthus gmelinii D.Don; Erica bryantha Thunb.; Menziesia bryantha (L.) Sw.

= Bryanthus =

Genus of flowering plants

Bryanthus is a monotypic genus of ornamental plant in the flowering plant family Ericaceae, with the sole species Bryanthus musciformis, native to Japan, Kamchatka, and the Kuril Islands. The genus was created in 1769. In 2012, the new tribe Bryantheae was proposed based on genetic analysis, containing the genera Bryanthus and Ledothamnus.

== Former species ==
Species that have been placed in Bryanthus include:

- Bryanthus aleuticus (Spreng.) A.Gray, synonym of Phyllodoce aleutica
- Bryanthus empetriformis (Sm.) A.Gray, synonym of Phyllodoce empetriformis
- Bryanthus × erectus Lindl. & Paxt., synonym of × Phyllothamnus erectus
- Bryanthus glanduliflorus (Hook.) A.Gray, synonym of Phyllodoce glanduliflora
- Bryanthus intermedius (Hook.) A.Gray, synonym of Phyllodoce × intermedia
