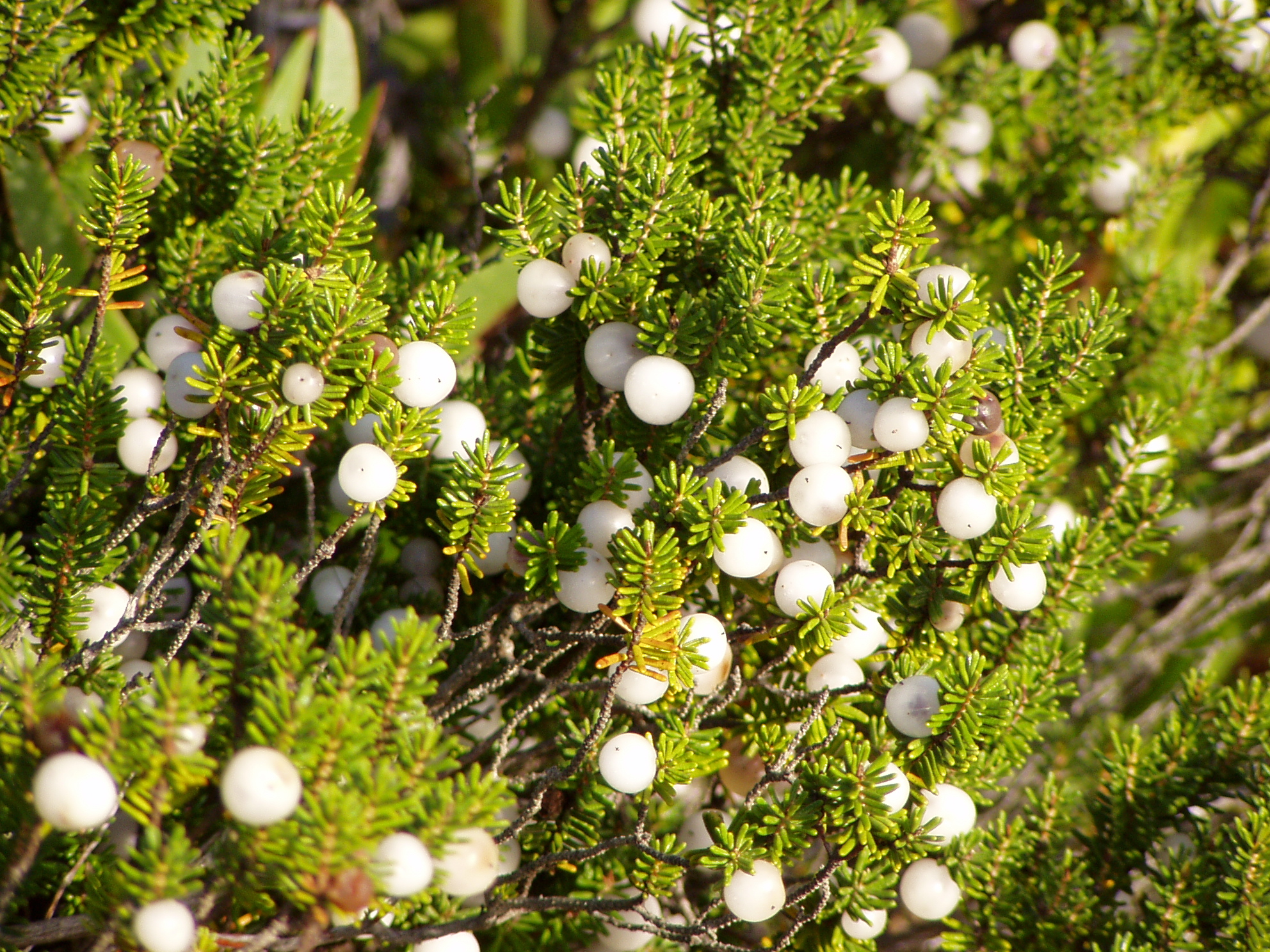

Scientific classification
- Kingdom: Plantae
- Clade: Tracheophytes
- Clade: Angiosperms
- Clade: Eudicots
- Clade: Asterids
- Order: Ericales
- Family: Ericaceae
- Genus: Corema
- Species: C. album

Binomial name
- Corema album (L.) D. Don

Synonyms
- Corema febrifugum Boiss. ex Willk. & Lange; Euleucum album (L.) Raf.; Empetrum album L.

= Corema album =

Species of flowering plant

Corema album, the Portuguese crowberry (Portuguese: camarinha; Galician: camariña); Spanish: camarina; French: camarine, is a species of flowering plant in the family Ericaceae endemic to the Iberian Peninsula, Aquitaine, and the Azores (sub-species), where it may also be considered a different species. Its white berries are known to have been consumed by people in the Iberian Peninsula at least since the Middle-Ages. The only other species of the same genus is Corema conradii, found in North America.

== Description ==
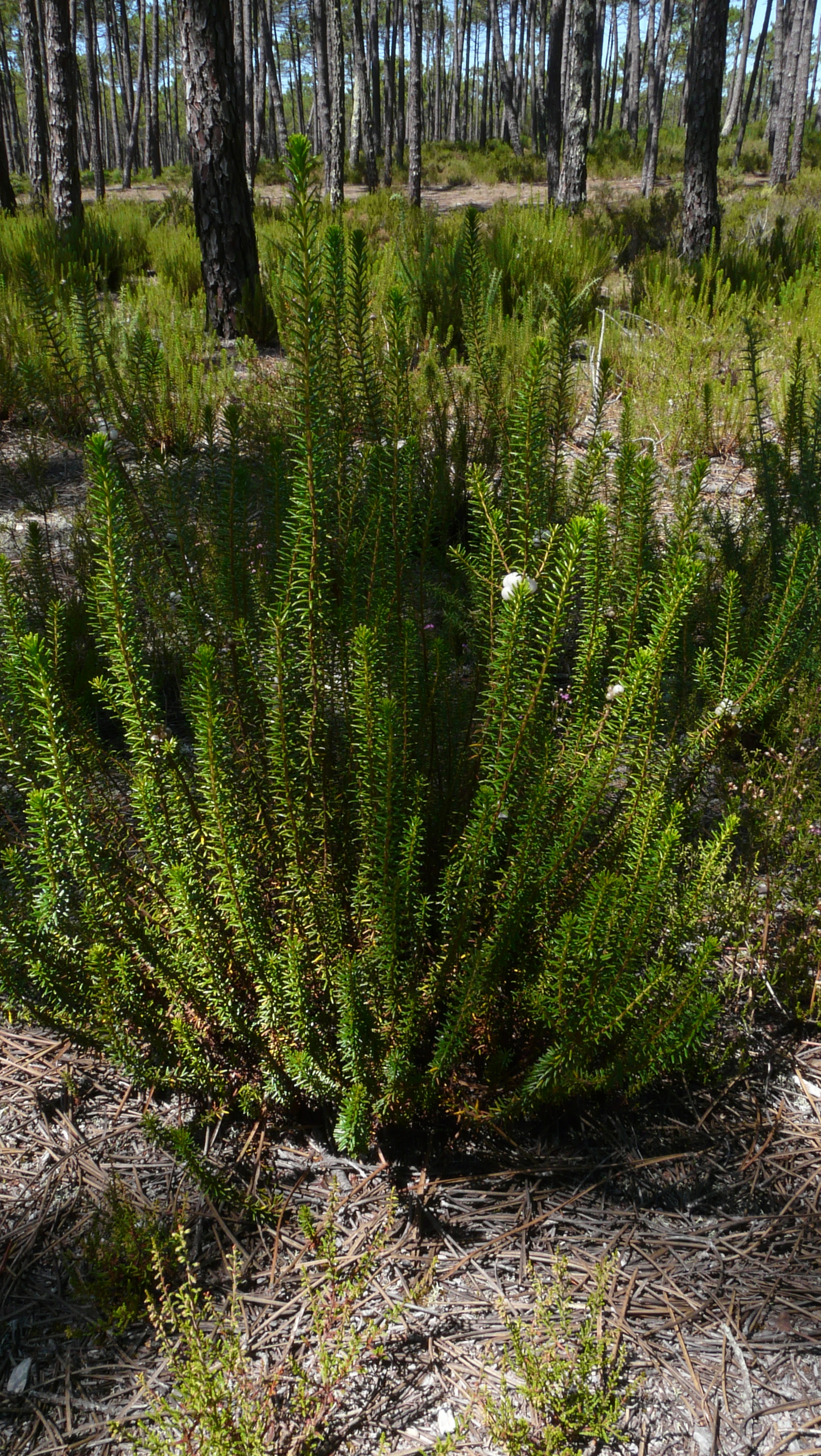
Corema album in a coastal maritime pine forest, Ovar

Corema album is a dioecious, perennial shrub with numerous branches, usually between 30–75 mm (1.2–3.0 in) tall, which can reach 1 m (3 ft 3 in) both in stature and width. Male plants are more upright and female have shorter and more procumbent branches. The leaves are in whorls of three or four, with short petioles which tend to lie against the stem. They are 8–10 mm (0.31–0.39 in) long x 1 mm (0.039 in) wide and are covered with sessile glands when young. Roots are thick and spreading, similar to other members of the Ericaceae.

Despite being dioecious, some plants from the southwest of the Peninsula have some hermaphrodite inflorescences paired with male inflorescences, though the fruits originated by hermaphrodite flowers have a tendency to be underdeveloped. Fruits appear in the middle of the branch as the terminal bud continues to grow. Female flowers are smaller than the male flowers. The fruits are white or pink-white, berry-like drupes, 5–8 mm (0.20–0.31 in) in diameter with 2 to 9 pyrenes.

Fruits are edible and completely white when ripe, with a hardy skin.The taste is mildly acidic with a lemony flavour.

Corema album growth phase occurs from late February to July, with incidence on the late spring. It flowers mostly from January to April and the fruit ripens in June–July in the south, and August–September in the north, remaining on the plant until October through December. This plant genus is believed to live for a period between 25 and 35 years.

== Distribution and habitat ==
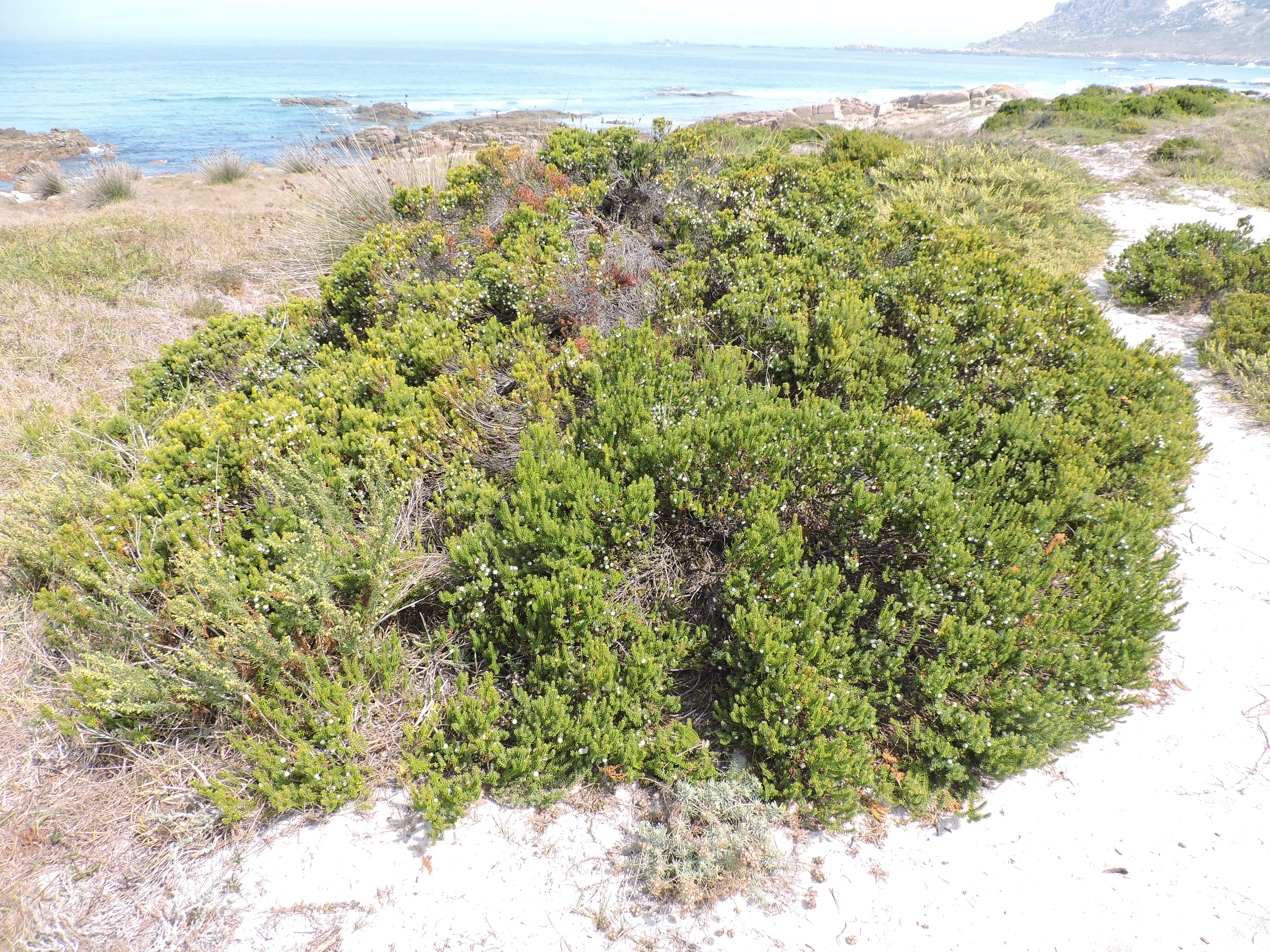
Corema album on a sand dune environment, Costa da Morte

Corema album has two subspecies with completely different distributions.

C. album subsp. album is common in coastal sandy dunes of the Atlantic Iberia and Aquitaine (Southwestern France), from Galicia and the Cíes Islands in the north, along the whole Portuguese coast and further south, to the Province of Cádiz, Spain. It is particularly common in secondary dunes and dune valleys, where extreme communities often originate.

C. album subsp. azoricum inhabits volcanic lava and ash fields and is present on five or six of the nine islands of the Azores at usually low altitudes (below 200 m (660 ft)).

There are large populations in the three large dune systems, Aspeillo in Doñana National Park in the south of Spain, then from Sines to Tróia (around the Comporta coast) in southwestern Portugal, and in the Costa de Prata of central-north Portugal, between the Nazaré and Ovar coastline strip. It is particularly abundant in Praia do Pedrógão, Leiria. Disjunct populations exist on cliffs and isolated sand dunes throughout the rest of the range.

The bush is a drought-adapted Mediterranean shrub and will tolerate low moisture levels in the soil.

== Ecology ==
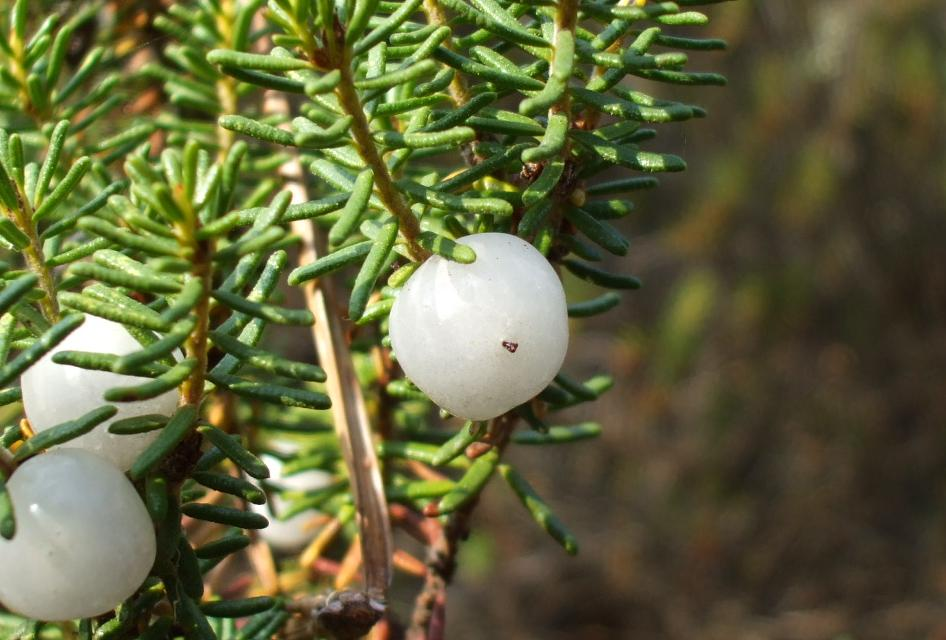
Berry closeup

C. album subsp. album grows mainly on sand dunes, but will also inhabit rocky sites and cliffs. It occurs primarily in heathland, dwarf scrub and scrub vegetation of Halimium halimifolium, Cistus libanotis, Rosmarinus officinalis, Lavandula stoechas, Cytisus grandiflorus, Stauracanthus genistoides, Juniperus oxycedrus, Juniperus phoenicea, and is the dominant scrub in some areas along with Pinus pinea.

== Conservation ==
In the Azores, the species is considered a priority for conservation and is one of the one hundred endangered species with priority for conservation in the Macaronesia region.

In mainland Europe the species is not considered endangered despite growing in protected dune systems (e.g. Southwest Alentejo and Vicentine Coast Natural Park and Doñana National Park).

== Horticultural distribution ==
Corema album has been reported to grow very well near London, England and be hardy in USDA hardiness zone 8. Its natural distribution is mostly within zone 10 and a portion of Zone 9 in the Peninsula, and 11 in the Azores.

Seed germination is improved when fruits are ingested by animals. Most seeds need a dormancy period of 1–2 years but this can be avoided by keeping them moist. The plant can be propagated by cuttings.

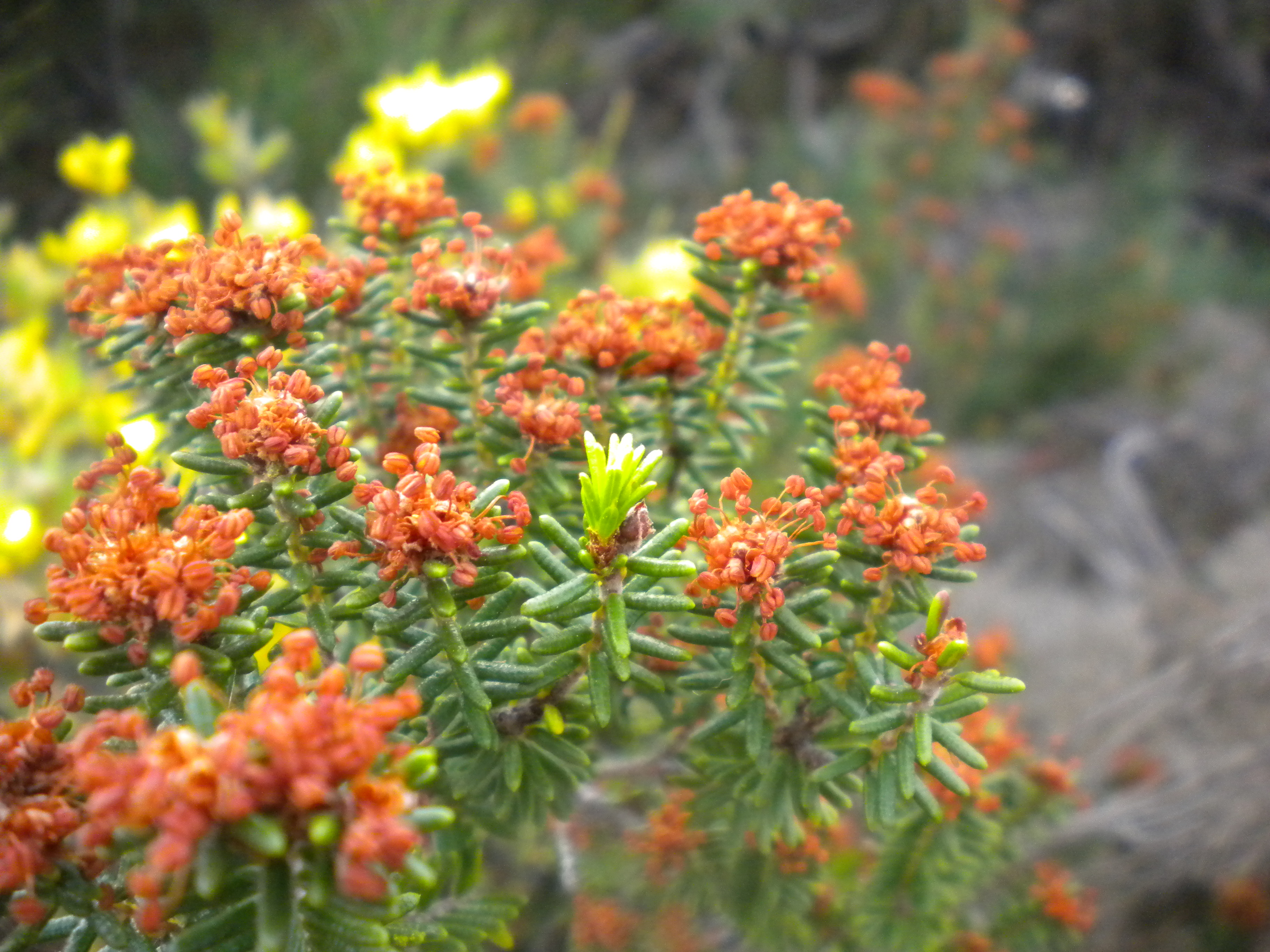
Stamens

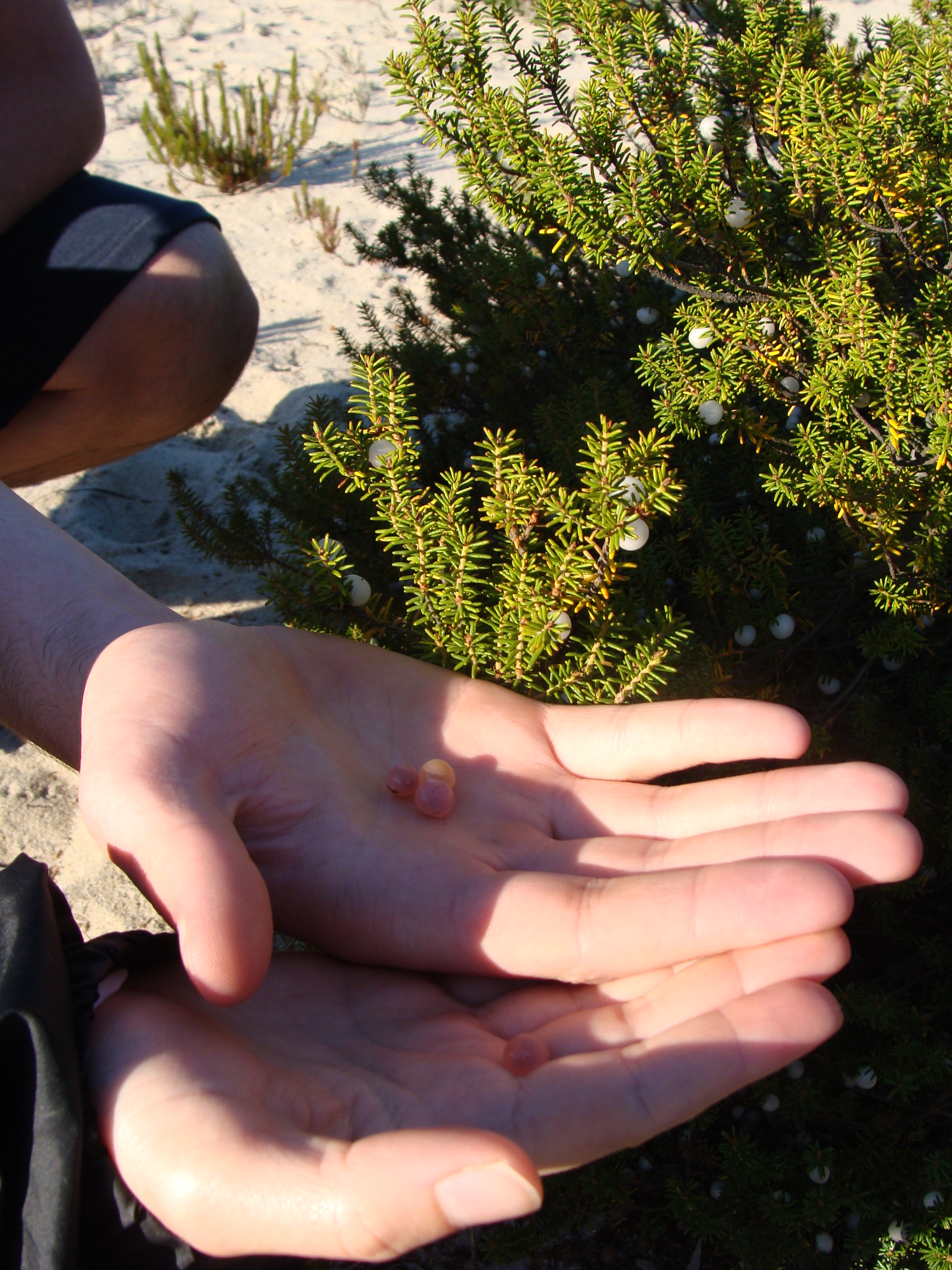
Corema album in São Jacinto Dunes Natural Reserve

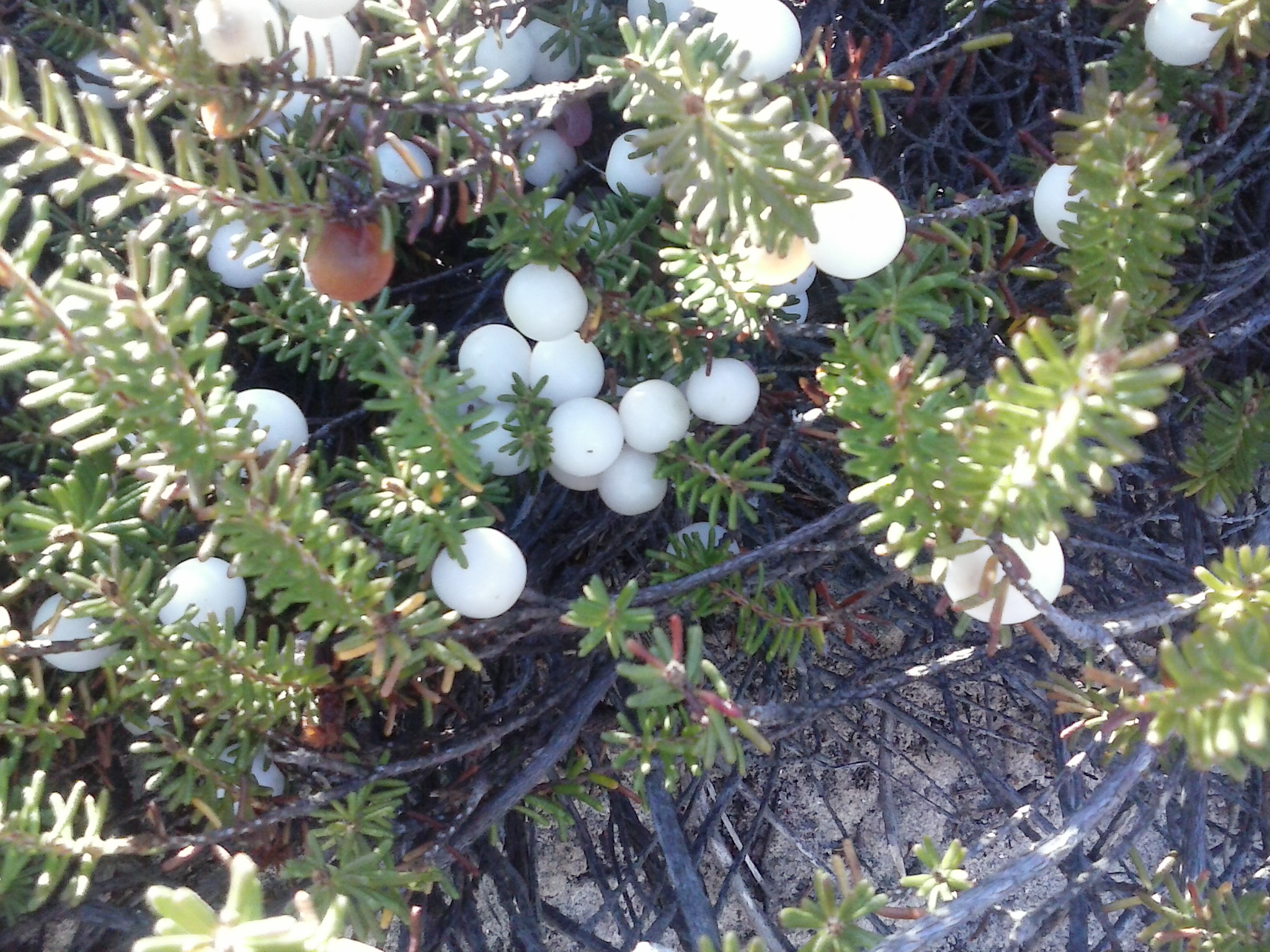
Berries
