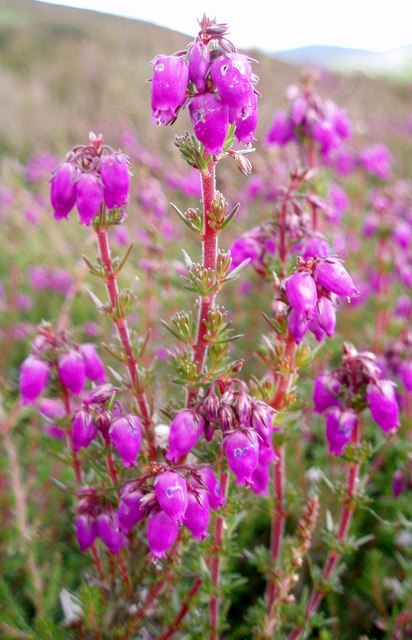
- Erica cinerea

Scientific classification
- Kingdom: Plantae
- Clade: Embryophytes
- Clade: Tracheophytes
- Clade: Angiosperms
- Clade: Eudicots
- Clade: Asterids
- Order: Ericales
- Family: Ericaceae
- Subfamily: Ericoideae; Link 1829

Type genus
- Erica L.

Tribes
- Bejarieae; Empetreae; Ericeae; Phyllodoceae; Rhodoreae; Epigaea

= Ericoideae =

Subfamily of flowering plants in the heather family

Ericoideae is a subfamily of Ericaceae, containing sixteen genera, and 1,790 species, the largest of which is Rhododendron, followed by Erica. The Ericoideae bear spiral leaves with flat laminae. The pedicel is articulated and the flowers are pendulous or erect, and monosymmetric, with an abaxial median sepal. The carpels are free and the anthers lack appendages. The capsule is septicidal.

== Subdivision ==
As of November 2022, the NCBI Taxonomy Browser recognized five tribes:

- Tribe Bryantheae
  - Genera: Bryanthus – Ledothamnus
- Tribe Empetreae
  - Genera: Ceratiola – Corema – Empetrum (plus Diplarche, treated as a synonym of Rhododendron by Plants of the World Online)
- Tribe Ericeae
  - Genera: Calluna – Daboecia – Erica (plus Bruckenthalia, treated as a synonym of Erica by Plants of the World Online)
- Tribe Phyllodoceae
  - Genera: Bejaria – Elliottia – Epigaea – Kalmia – Kalmiopsis – Phyllodoce – Rhodothamnus (plus the artificial hybrid genera × Kalmiothamnus and × Phyllothamnus)
- Tribe Rhodoreae
  - Genera: Rhododendron (plus Ledum, Menziesia and Therorhodion, treated as synonyms of Rhododendron by Plants of the World Online)

List of genera:

- Bejaria
- Bryanthus
- Calluna
- Ceratiola
- Corema
- Daboecia
- Elliottia
- Empetrum
- Epigaea
- Erica
- Kalmia
- Kalmiopsis
- Ledothamnus
- Phyllodoce
- Rhododendron
- Rhodothamnus
