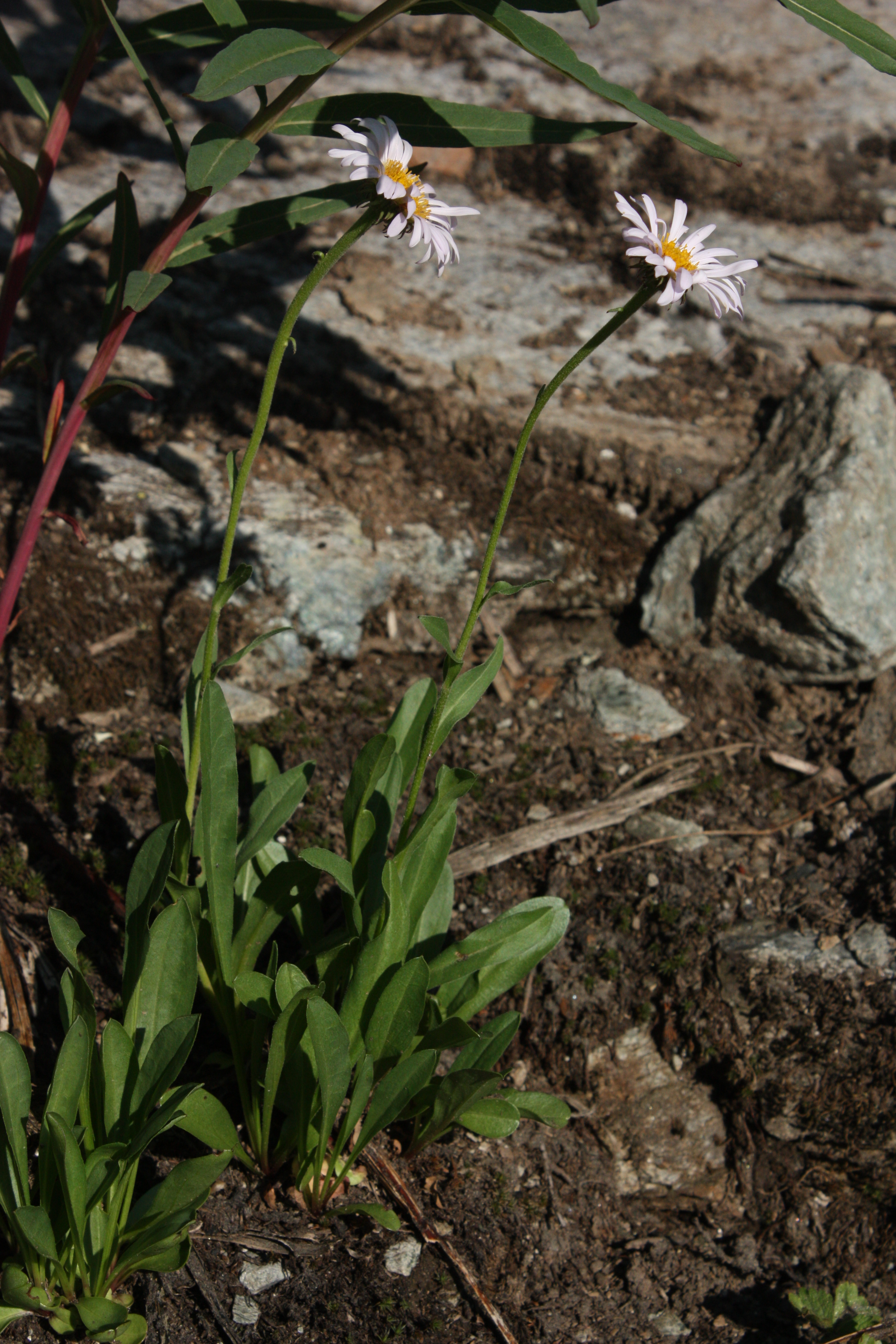
- Erigeron glacialis var. glacialis

Scientific classification
- Kingdom: Plantae
- Clade: Tracheophytes
- Clade: Angiosperms
- Clade: Eudicots
- Clade: Asterids
- Order: Asterales
- Family: Asteraceae
- Genus: Erigeron
- Species: E. glacialis

Binomial name
- Erigeron glacialis (Nutt.) A.Nelson

Synonyms
- Aster glacialis Nutt.; Erigeron angustifolius (A.Gray) Rydb. 1897 not Phil. 1894; Erigeron callianthemus Greene; Erigeron loratus Greene; Erigeron scaposus Torr. & A.Gray 1841 not DC. 1836

= Erigeron glacialis =

Species of flowering plant

Erigeron glacialis, the glacial daisy, glacial fleabane, Subalpine fleabane, or wandering fleabane, is a western North American perennial plant in the family Asteraceae.

Erigeron glacialis is native to the mountains of western North America, including Cascades, the Sierra Nevada, and the Rocky Mountains. It has been found from Alaska and Yukon south as far as California, Arizona, and New Mexico. In the Sierra Nevada, it may be found with mixed coniferous and upper montane vegetation types, and in the alpine zone to 11,200 feet (3,400 m).

Erigeron glacialis is a perennial herb up to 70 cm (28 inches) tall, with a thick taproot and spreading by means of underground rhizomes. Leaves are up to 20 cm (8 inches) long, linear-oblanceolate to broadly lanceolate or spatulate. Each stem sometimes produces only 1 flower head, sometimes a group of up to 8. Each head has up to 80 white, blue, pink, or lavender ray florets surrounding numerous yellow disc florets.

It blooms between July and September.

Varieties

- Erigeron glacialis var. glacialis - most of species range
- Erigeron glacialis var. hirsutus (Cronquist) G.L.Nesom - California, Nevada
