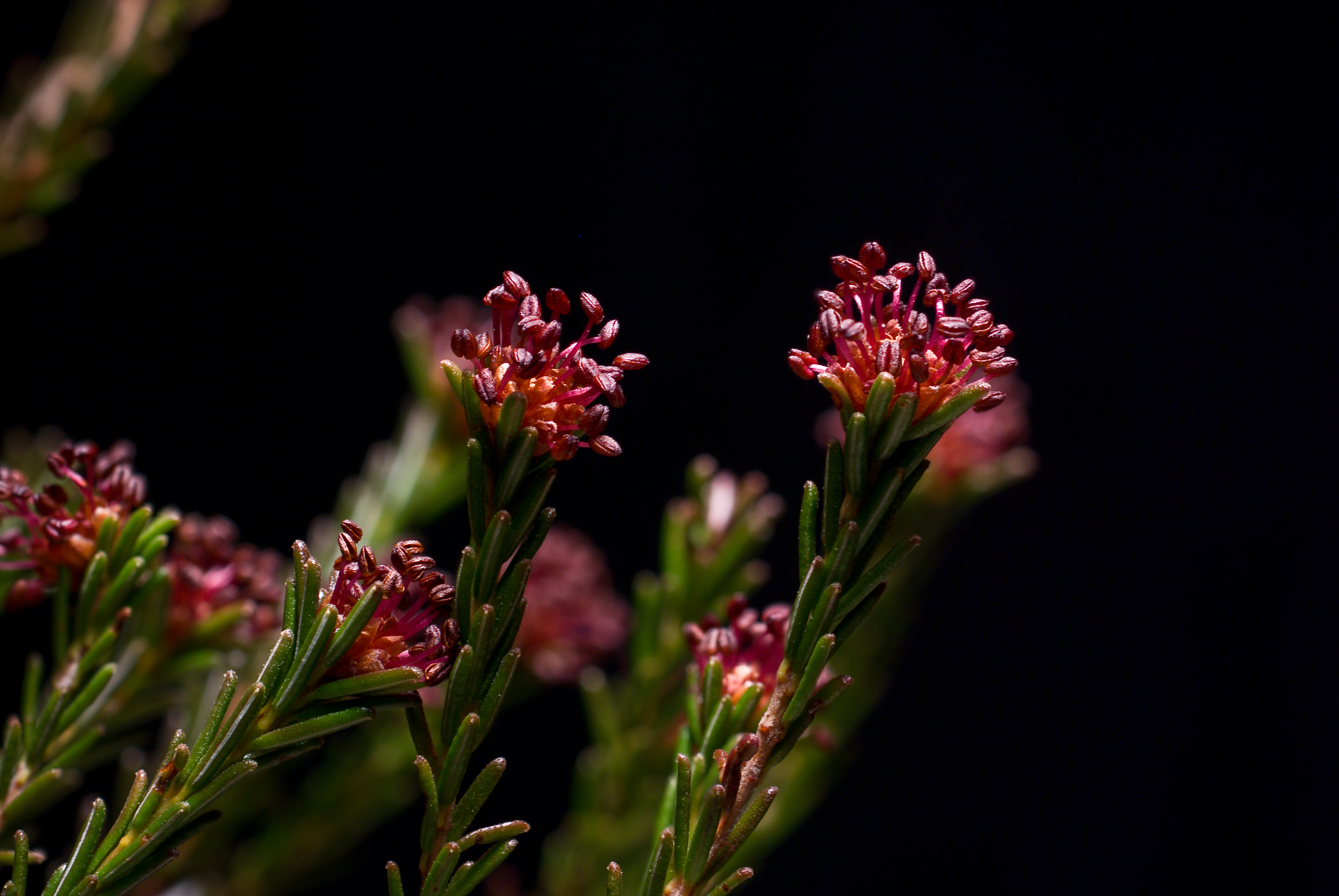

Conservation status
- Apparently Secure (NatureServe)

Scientific classification
- Kingdom: Plantae
- Clade: Tracheophytes
- Clade: Angiosperms
- Clade: Eudicots
- Clade: Asterids
- Order: Ericales
- Family: Ericaceae
- Genus: Corema
- Species: C. conradii

Binomial name
- Corema conradii (Torr.) Torr. ex Loudon

Synonyms
- Colema arenaria Raf.; Empetrum conradii Torr.; Endammia ericoides Raf.

= Corema conradii =

Species of flowering plant

Corema conradii is a species of flowering plant in the heath family known by the common name broom crowberry. It is native to eastern North America, where it has a disjunct distribution, occurring intermittently from Nova Scotia to Massachusetts, in the Shawangunk Mountains of New York, and in the Pine Barrens of New Jersey. Studies indicate that the plant might be a hybrid between ancestral populations of Corema album and Ceratiola.

== Description ==
This plant, one of only two species in genus Corema, is a small perennial shrub or subshrub. It branches to about 60 centimeters in maximum height. It is shorter in stature in the southern part of its range, and sometimes takes a cushionlike form. It may grow colonially, forming a dense stand of up to 100% ground-cover. It has gray or reddish orange, shreddy bark. The yellow-green leaves are linear in shape and needlelike. They are up to 6 millimeters long but less than a millimeter wide. The herbage is aromatic. The species is dioecious, with male and female reproductive parts occurring on separate individuals. The tiny sepals are reddish or purplish. Flowering generally starts in March. The fruit is a gray drupe under two millimeters wide.

== Ecology ==
This plant grows on the coastal plain, often on very sandy soils. In Maine, it is associated with Empetrum nigrum, Pinus rigida, and small oaks. In Massachusetts, it can be found with P. rigida, Betula populifolia, Vaccinium vacillans, and Comptonia peregrina. It is a dominant species on Nantucket and Cape Cod, forming a heathland. It is a fire-adapted species, growing in openings in the forest which are created by fire burning away the canopy. It is adapted to disturbance and grows on disturbed soils and recent burns. It grows on pine barrens, which have a regime of frequent fires. High levels of seedling recruitment are experienced in areas recently burned. In June 2001, an F-16 practicing bombing at the Warren Grove, New Jersey range missed its target and started a fire that burned patches of C. conradii where no seedlings had been seen since observations began in 1996. After the fire, which killed the adult plants, many seedlings emerged over the next two years; unburned C. conradii stands nearby did not develop seedlings. Areas in Nantucket which have been grazed heavily, burned, and exposed to harsh conditions have wide stands of the plant. It may act as a pioneer species, taking hold on recently cleared soil. The fruits are collected by the ant species Aphaenogaster rudis, which may aid in seed dispersal.
