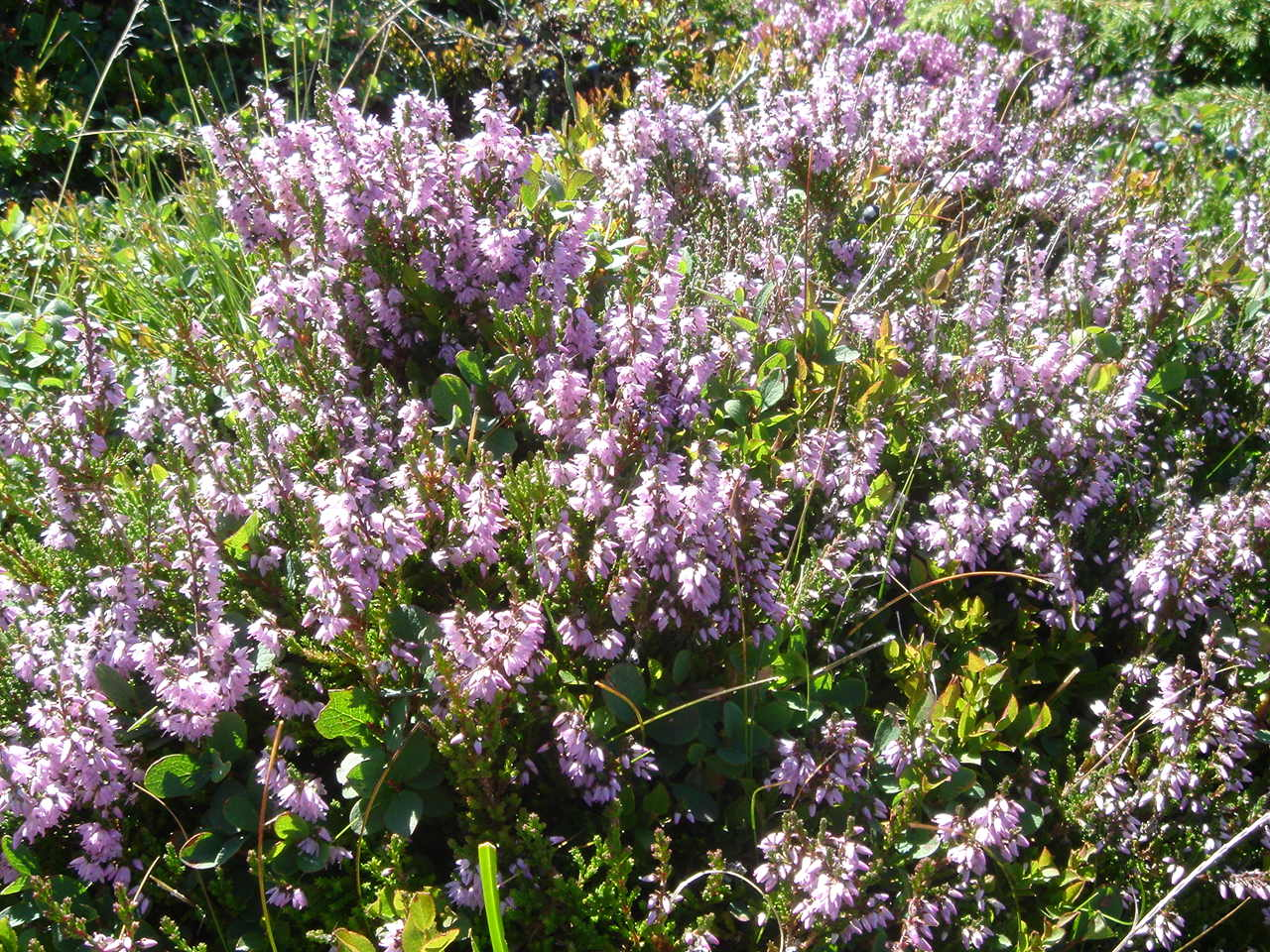
- Calluna vulgaris

Scientific classification
- Kingdom: Plantae
- Clade: Tracheophytes
- Clade: Angiosperms
- Clade: Eudicots
- Clade: Asterids
- Order: Ericales
- Family: Ericaceae
- Subfamily: Ericoideae
- Tribe: Ericeae; DC. ex Duby

= Ericeae =

Tribe of flowering plants

Ericeae is a tribe of flowering plants in the family Ericaceae. The members of this tribe are known as the heaths. It contains three genera, with the largest being Erica.

== Distribution ==
Ericeae has a cosmopolitan distribution besides Antarctica.

== Genera ==
The 3 genera of Ericeae are:

- Calluna Richard Anthony Salisbury, 1802
- Daboecia David Don, 1834
- Erica Carl Linnaeus, 1753
