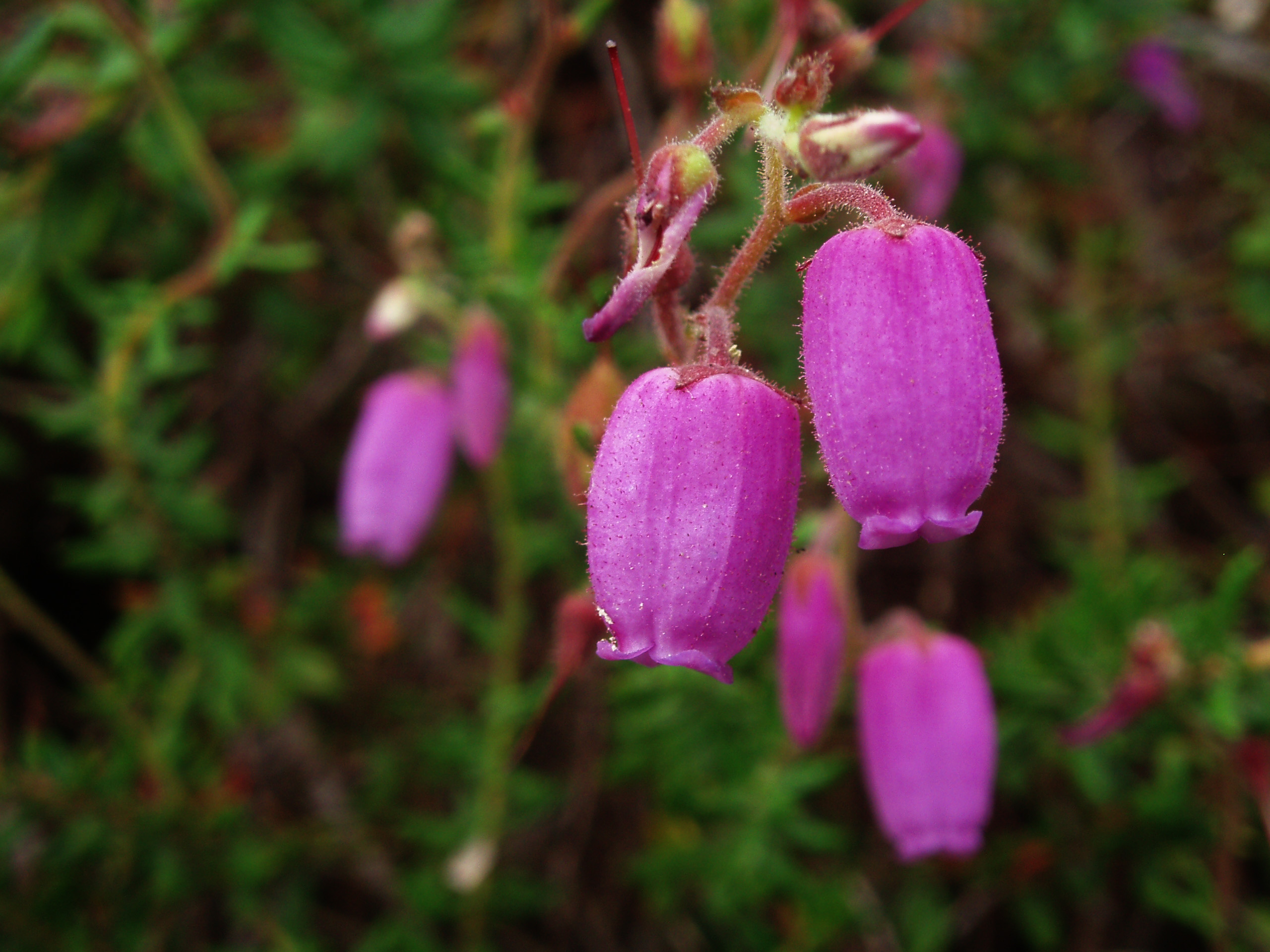
- Daboecia cantabrica

Scientific classification
- Kingdom: Plantae
- Clade: Embryophytes
- Clade: Tracheophytes
- Clade: Angiosperms
- Clade: Eudicots
- Clade: Asterids
- Order: Ericales
- Family: Ericaceae
- Subfamily: Ericoideae
- Tribe: Ericeae
- Genus: Daboecia; D.Don

= Daboecia =

Genus of flowering plants in the heath family

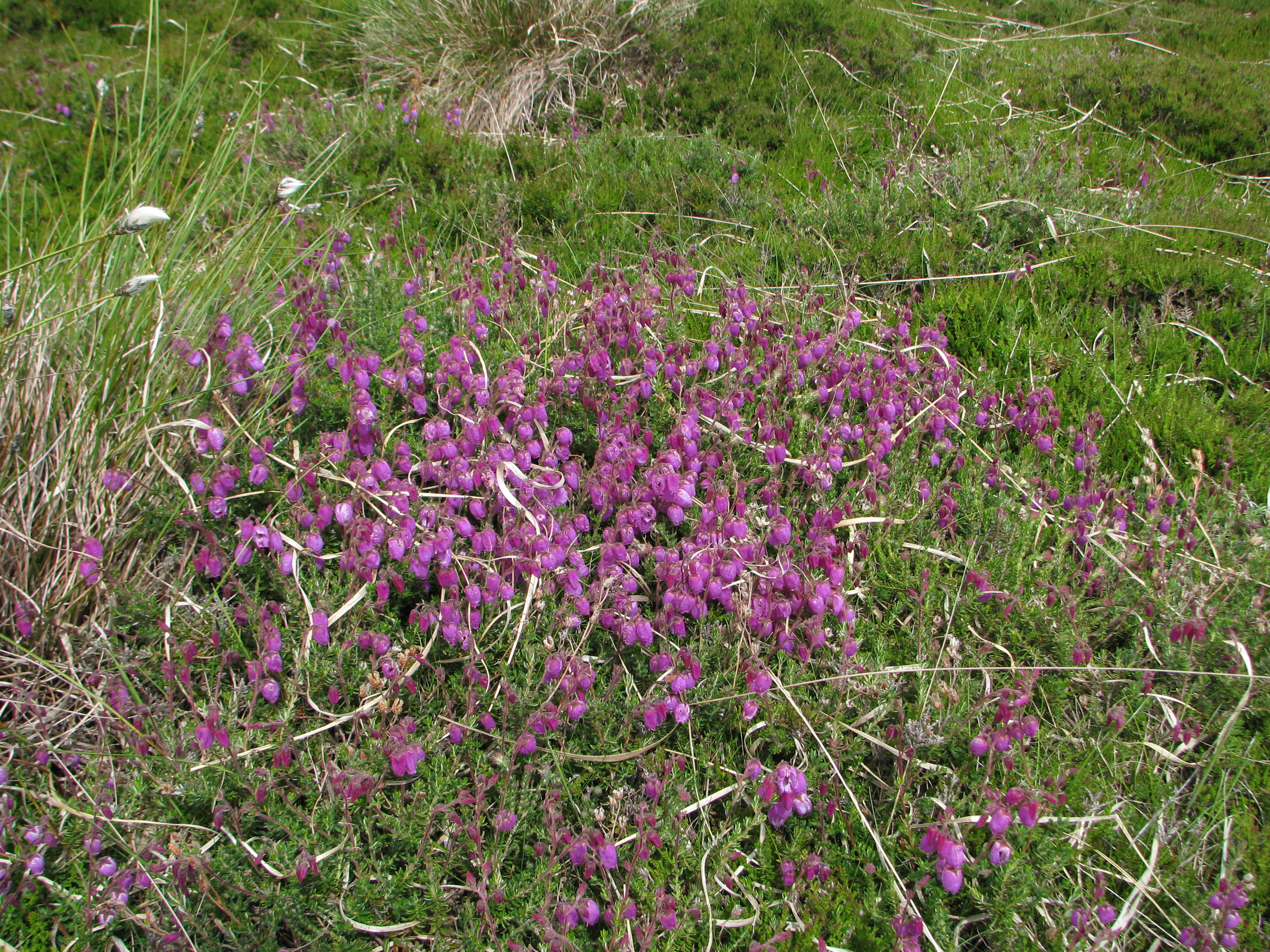

Daboecia /dæˈbiːʃiə/, or St. Dabeoc's heath, is a small genus of flowering plants in the family Ericaceae, containing two evergreen shrubs, closely related to the genus Erica. They are native to cliffs and heathland in southern Atlantic Europe and the Azores.

== Description ==
They produce urn-shaped flowers in shades of white, pink and red. Daboecia differ from European Erica species in having a substantially larger corolla. The leaves are always alternate in Daboecia, never whorled. The generic name comes from the Irish Saint Dabheog.

== Distribution ==
Daboecia has an oceanic distribution in western Europe, including western Ireland, western France, northwestern Spain, northwestern mainland Portugal and the Central Group of the Azores. Like Erica and Calluna species, Daboecia are calcifuges, but will tolerate neutral soils and avoid peat. The plant is also found on mountain trails and roadsides in the west of Ireland, brought with Spanish wine by traders from medieval times.

== Species ==
- Daboecia azorica Tutin & E. F. Warb.
- Daboecia cantabrica (Huds.) K. Koch (Irish heath)

Some botanists regard D. azorica as a subspecies of D. cantabrica, which would render the genus monospecific.

== Cultivation ==
The two species have been extensively cultivated and hybridised to produce a number of popular garden plants. Cultivars include selections from the hybrid between the two species, which is named Daboecia × scotica.

The following cultivars have gained the Royal Horticultural Society's Award of Garden Merit (confirmed 2017):

- D. cantabrica 'Waley's Red'
- D. cantabrica subsp. scotica 'Silverwells'
- D. cantabrica subsp. scotica 'William Hicks'
