= Rhodothamnus sessilifolius =

Conservation status
- Critically Endangered (IUCN 3.1)

Scientific classification
- Kingdom: Plantae
- Clade: Tracheophytes
- Clade: Angiosperms
- Clade: Eudicots
- Clade: Asterids
- Order: Ericales
- Family: Ericaceae
- Genus: Rhodothamnus
- Species: R. sessilifolius

Binomial name
- Rhodothamnus sessilifolius P.H.Davis

Species of plant

Rhodothamnus sessilifolius, commonly known as the sessile-leaved rhodothamnus, is a flowering plant in the family Ericaceae. It is endemic to Turkey.

It is classified as critically endangered by the International Union for Conservation of Nature.

== Distribution ==
It is found in Turkey.

== Taxonomy ==
It was described by Peter Hadland Davis, in Hooker's Icon. Pl. 36: t. 3575 in 1962.
