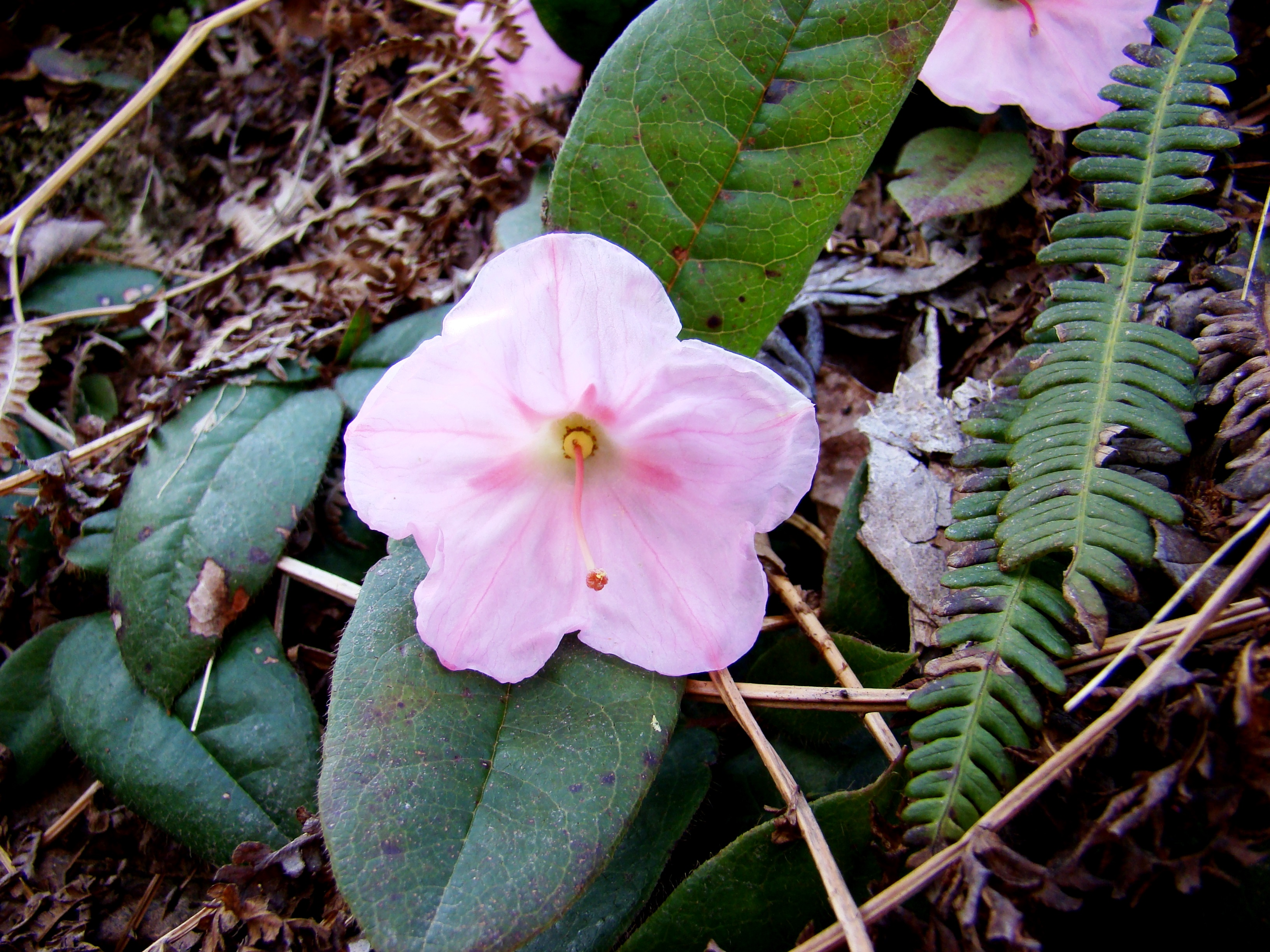

Scientific classification
- Kingdom: Plantae
- Clade: Tracheophytes
- Clade: Angiosperms
- Clade: Eudicots
- Clade: Asterids
- Order: Ericales
- Family: Ericaceae
- Genus: Epigaea
- Species: E. gaultherioides

Binomial name
- Epigaea gaultherioides (Boiss. & Balansa) Takht.

Synonyms
- Orphanidesia gaultherioides Boiss. & Balansa

= Epigaea gaultherioides =

Species of plant in the family Ericaceae

Epigaea gaultherioides is a species of flowering plant in the Ericaceae family. It is native to Transcaucasia and Turkey.

== Description ==
Epigaea gaultherioides is an evergreen subshrub (height: 0.5 m). Leaves elliptical (long: 60-110 mm, wide: 30-55 mm), leathery, base cordate, apex acuminate, petiole pubescent (long: 5-15 mm). Inflorescence is an axillary fascicles of 1-3 flowers. Flowers: campanulate calyx (long: 12-15 mm), with 5 oval lobes, funneliform and pink corolla, with 5 lobes. Subglobose capsules (long: 1 mm).
