= Upper montane forest =

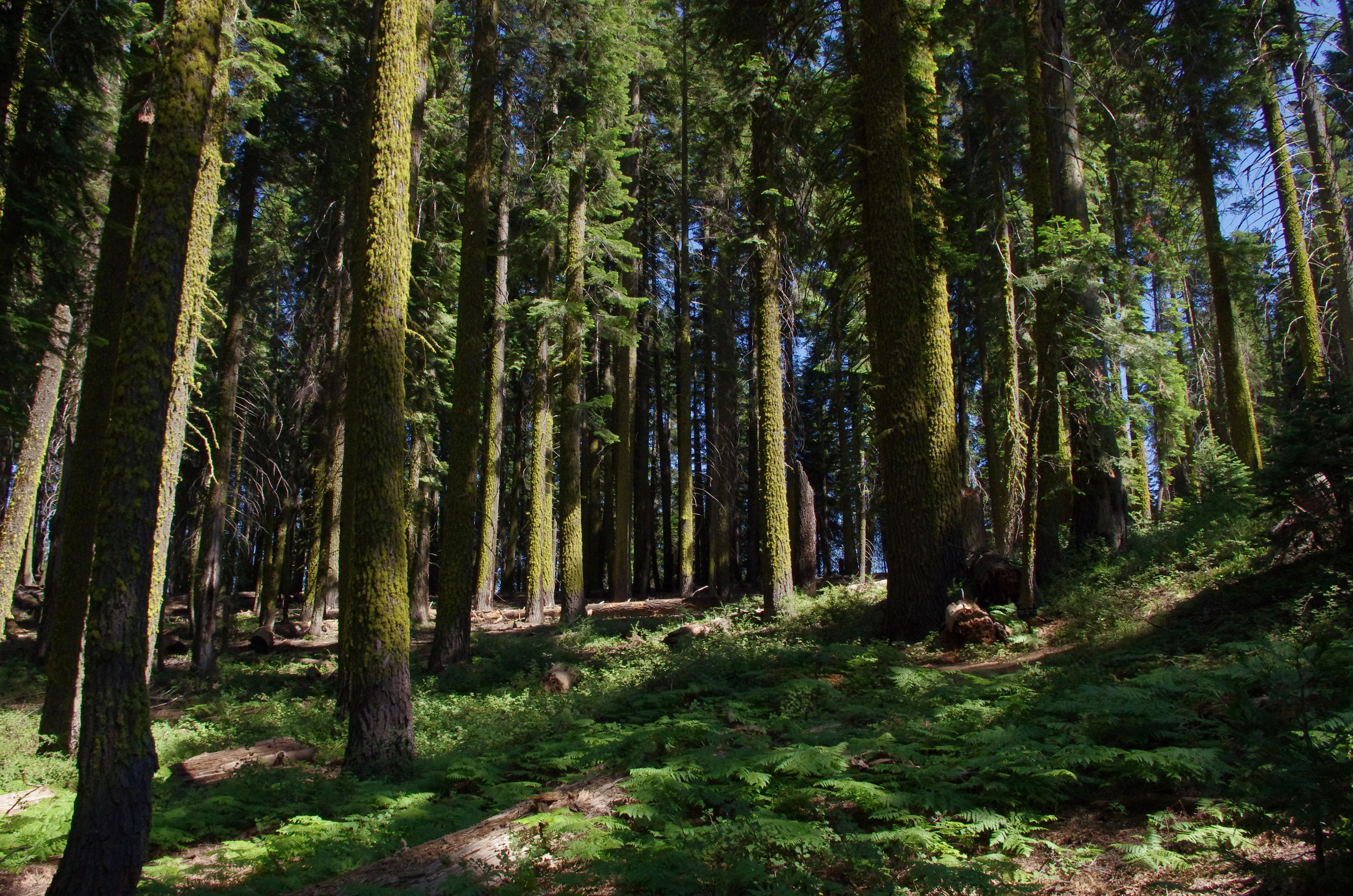
Upper montane forest in Sequoia National Park

The upper montane forest is a vegetation type generally found above the mixed coniferous forest and below the subalpine forest vegetation types. Most of what grows in upper montane forests are conifers, because of the short growing season.

== Pike and San Isabel National Forests ==
In the Pike National Forest and San Isabel National Forest of the Rocky Mountains, the upper montane forest is also called the "moist forest", with the mixed coniferous below called "dry forest", and the subalpine forest above called "cold forest". Stands may have a shade intolerant ponderosa pine (Pinus ponderosa) overstory, and a shade tolerant Douglas-fir (Pseudotsuga menziesii) or white fir (Abies concolor) understory.

== Lassen Volcanic Park ==
In Lassen Volcanic Park at the southern end of the Cascade Range, the upper montane forest is also known as red fir forest. It has less diversity than the mixed coniferous forest below. It occurs between 6,500 and 8,000 feet (2,000 and 2,400 m), consists of dense stands of red fir (Abies magnifica), and has little understory and few animals. In the western areas that are more open, western white pine (Pinus monticola) can commonly be found. Lodgepole pine (Pinus contorta) occurs in areas of thin soils. Summer temperatures are low in the almost total shade of the red fir.

== Sierra Nevada range ==
On the western slopes of the Sierra Nevada range, upper montane vegetation can be found at elevations from 5,500 to 7,500 feet (1,700 to 2,300 m) in the northern part of the range, 6,500 to 8,000 feet (2,000 to 2,400 m) in the central part, and 8,000 to 10,000 feet (2,400 to 3,000 m) in the southern part. On the eastern slopes, it is at higher elevations. Precipitation in areas of upper montane forest vegetation type is 35 to 65 feet (11 to 20 m), mostly as snowfall. Summer high temperatures range from 73 to 85 °F (23 to 29 °C), and winter lows are below 26 °F (−3 °C). Growing season is about four months because of long-lasting, deep snow. Overstory trees are typically cone shaped to shed the snow, with characteristic trees including lodgepole pine (Pinus contorta), Jeffrey pine (Pinus jeffreyi), western white pine (Pinus monticola) California red fir (Abies magnifica), and Sierra juniper (Juniperus grandis), and typical understory trees and shrubs such as huckleberry oak (Quercus vaccinifolia) and red heather (Phyllodoce breweri). The fire return interval is about 50–70 years.

The soils in this zone is mainly granitic, and are fast-draining and acidic. The soil is mostly covered in needle litter: the understory has little vegetation.
