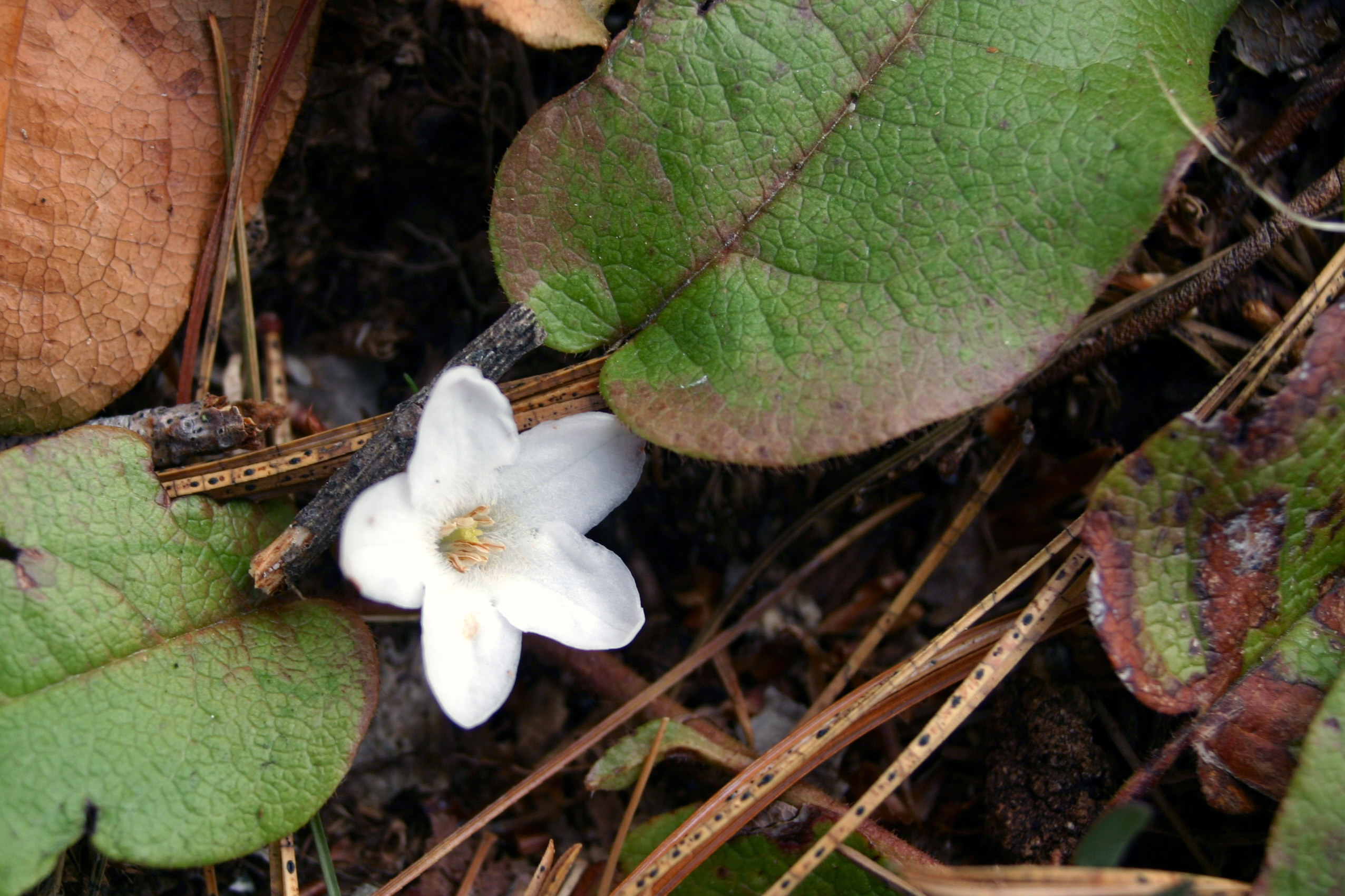

Scientific classification
- Kingdom: Plantae
- Clade: Tracheophytes
- Clade: Angiosperms
- Clade: Eudicots
- Clade: Asterids
- Order: Ericales
- Family: Ericaceae
- Genus: Epigaea
- Species: E. repens

Binomial name
- Epigaea repens L.

= Epigaea repens =

Species of flowering plant

Epigaea repens, the mayflower, trailing arbutus, or ground laurel, is a perennial, spreading shrub in the family Ericaceae. It is found from Newfoundland to Florida, west to Kentucky and into the Northwest Territories. It is the provincial flower of Nova Scotia.

== Description ==
The plant is a slow-growing, evergreen, prostrate to sprawling shrub that prefers moist, shady habitats and acidic (humus-rich) soil. It is often part of the heath complex in an oak-heath forest. It is thought that is sensitive to such as lumbering and grazing. This may account for its present scarcity. It is difficult to cultivate.

It grows 4-6 inches high and up to 20 inches long. Its stems are woody and the leafy twigs are covered in rust-colored hairs. The leaves are rough, alternate, ovate (oval-shaped with rounded bases), evergreen, glabrous above and more or less hairy beneath, and borne on short rusty-hairy petioles. It prefers sandy to peaty forest or clearings.

It blooms March, April and May. The flowers are pentamerous, pale pink to nearly white and very fragrant, about 0.5 inches (1.3 cm) across when expanded, and borne in clusters at the ends of the branches. The calyx consists of five dry, overlapping sepals. The corolla is salverform, with a slender hairy tube spreading into five equal lobes. There are five stamens. The gynoecium consists of one pistil with a columnar style and a five-lobed stigma. It is the larval host of the Hoary Elfin butterfly (Callophrys polia).

The genus name Epigaea, meaning "upon the earth", refers to this species' sprawling growth habit.

== Symbolism ==
Epigaea repens is the floral emblem of both Nova Scotia and Massachusetts. Digging up one in Massachusetts is punishable with a $50 fine. E. repens is sometimes referred to as the "Plymouth Mayflower" in reference to it being the first flower to be seen by the Pilgrim Fathers after the difficulties of their first winter.

== Use among Native Americans ==
The Algonquin use an infusion of leaves for kidney disorders. The Cherokee use a decoction of the plant to induce vomiting to treat abdominal pain, and they give an infusion of the plant to children for diarrhea. An infusion is also used for the kidneys and for "chest ailment". They also take a compound infusion for indigestion. The Haudenosaunee use a compound for labor pains in parturition, use a compound decoction for rheumatism, take a decoction of the leaves for indigestion, and they also take a decoction of the whole plant or roots, stalks and leaves taken for the kidneys.

The Forest Potawatomi regard this as their tribal flower and consider it to have come directly from their divinity.

== See also ==
- List of U.S. state flowers
- List of Canadian provincial and territorial symbols
