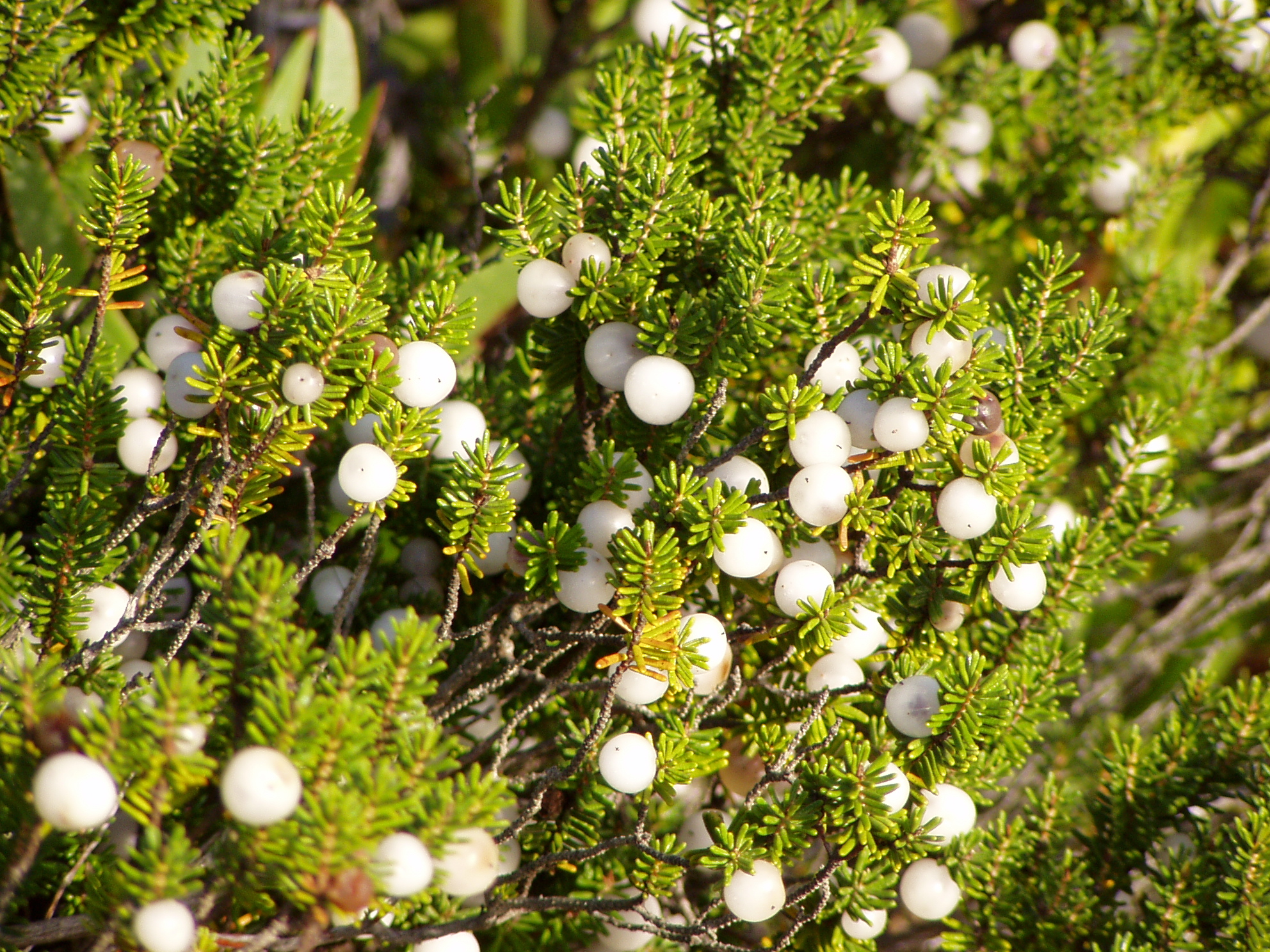
- Corema album fruit

Scientific classification
- Kingdom: Plantae
- Clade: Tracheophytes
- Clade: Angiosperms
- Clade: Eudicots
- Clade: Asterids
- Order: Ericales
- Family: Ericaceae
- Subfamily: Ericoideae
- Tribe: Empetreae
- Genus: Corema (D.Don)

Synonyms
- Tuckermania Klotzsch

= Corema =

Genus of flowering plants

Corema is a genus of two species of flowering plants in the family Ericaceae. They are dioecious small shrubs.

== Species ==
- Corema album (L.) D. Don ex Steud. Corema album is also known for it common name Camarinha or Portuguese crowberry. The drupe of this subspecies is white when ripe, and it is edible. The shrub grows to 1 meter, on average, and its branches have a honey-like aroma.
- Corema conradii (Torr.) Torr. ex Loudon
