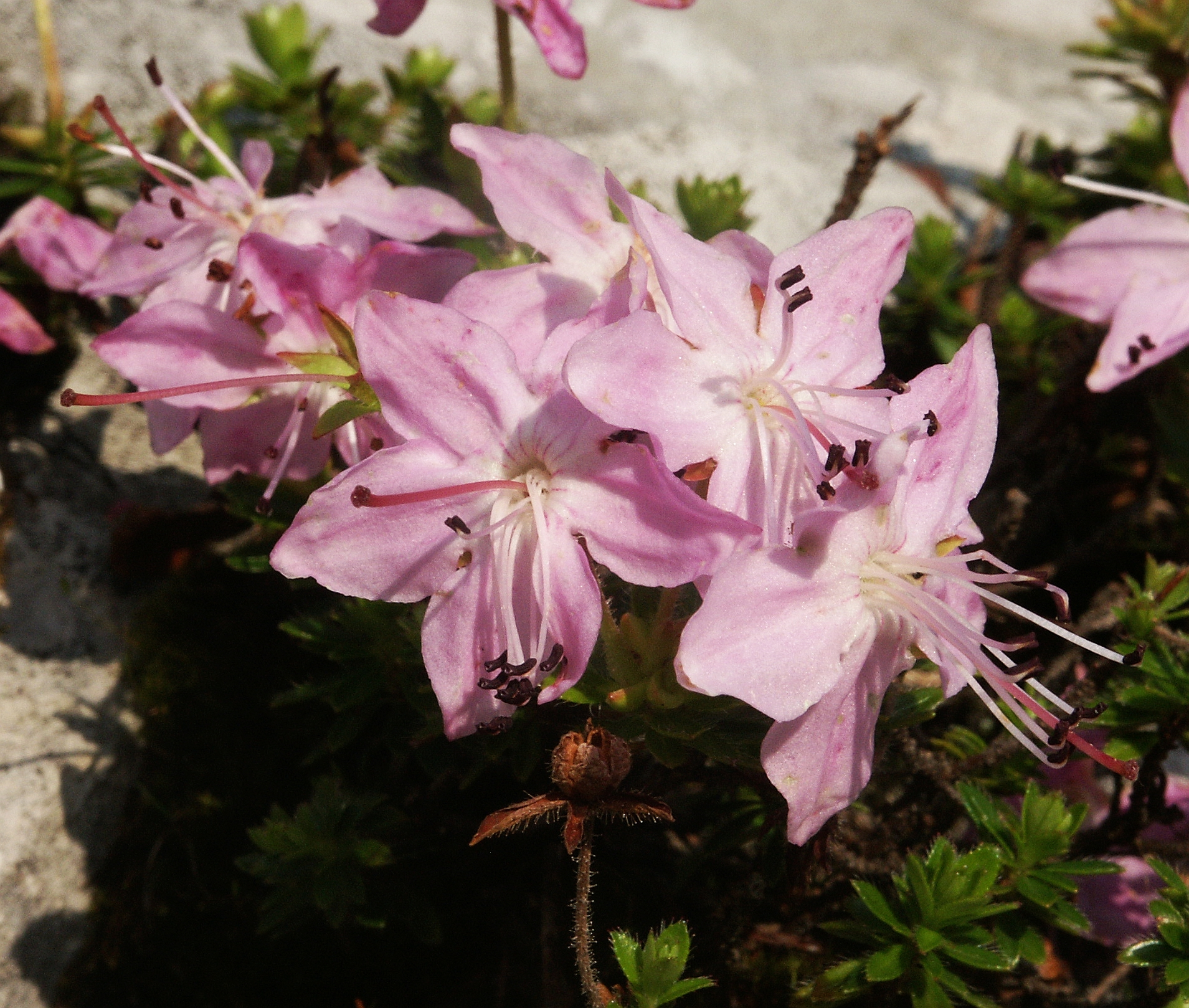
- Rhodothamnus chamaecistus

Scientific classification
- Kingdom: Plantae
- Clade: Embryophytes
- Clade: Tracheophytes
- Clade: Angiosperms
- Clade: Eudicots
- Clade: Asterids
- Order: Ericales
- Family: Ericaceae
- Subfamily: Ericoideae
- Tribe: Phyllodoceae
- Genus: Rhodothamnus; Rchb. (1827)

Species
- Rhodothamnus chamaecistus (L.) Rchb.; Rhodothamnus sessilifolius P.H.Davis

Synonyms
- Adodendron DC. (1839); Adodendrum Neck. (1790), opus utique oppr.

= Rhodothamnus =

Genus of flowering plants

Rhodothamnus is a genus of flowering plants in the family Ericaceae, disjunctly found in the Alps and Anatolia.

== Species ==
Two species are accepted.

- Rhodothamnus chamaecistus (L.) Rchb.
- Rhodothamnus sessilifolius P.H.Davis
