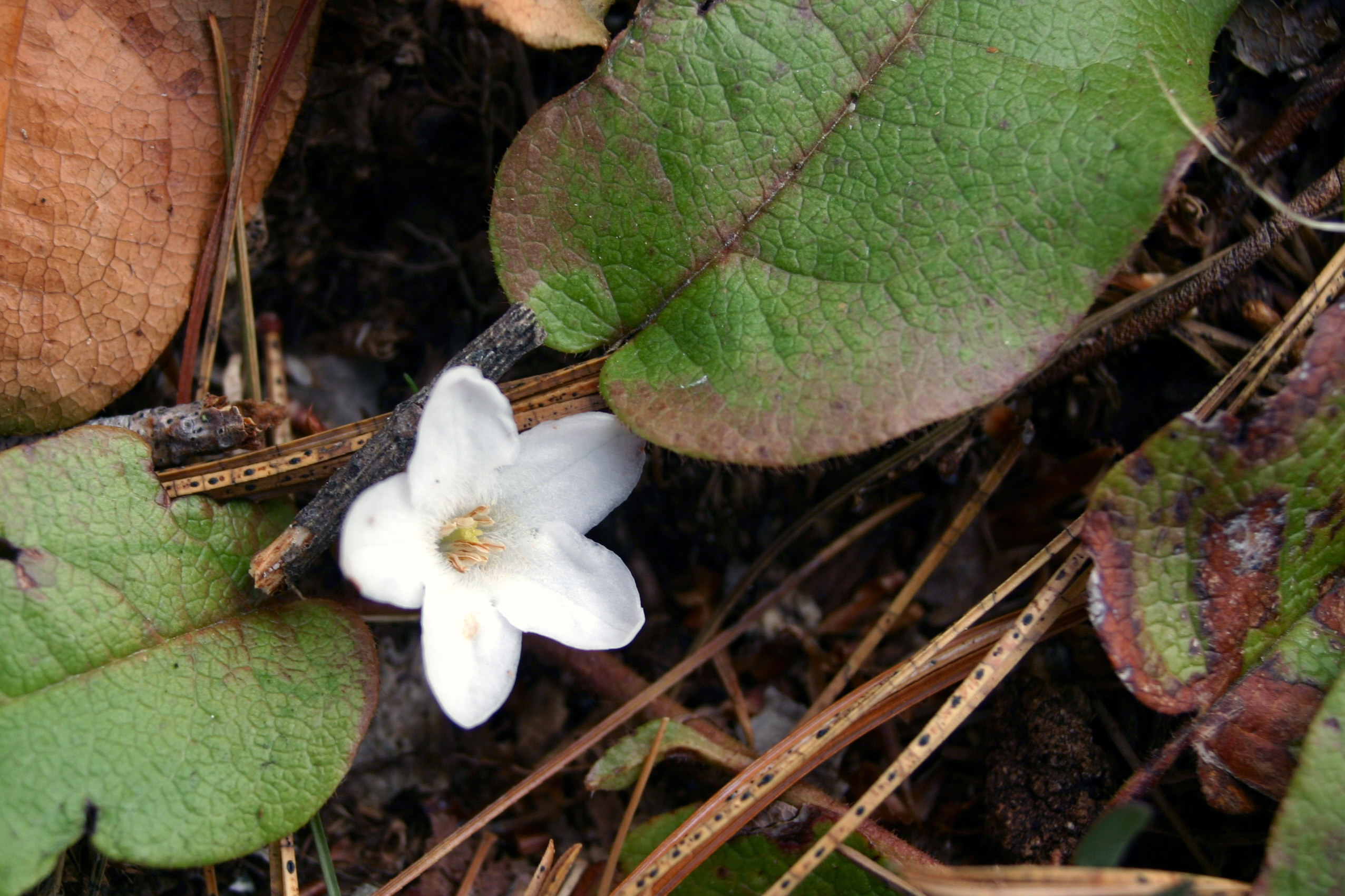
- Epigaea repens

Scientific classification
- Kingdom: Plantae
- Clade: Embryophytes
- Clade: Tracheophytes
- Clade: Angiosperms
- Clade: Eudicots
- Clade: Asterids
- Order: Ericales
- Family: Ericaceae
- Subfamily: Ericoideae
- Tribe: Phyllodoceae
- Genus: Epigaea; L.

Species
- Epigaea asiatica; Epigaea gaultherioides; Epigaea repens

Synonyms
- Memaecylum Mitch.; Orphanidesia Boiss. & Balansa; Parapyrola Miq.

= Epigaea =

Genus of flowering plants in the heath family

Epigaea is a small genus of flowering plant in the family Ericaceae. The species are small creeping shrubs that are typically anywhere from 10 to 20 cm (3.9 to 7.9 in) tall at full growth, forming large patches. The leaves are evergreen, alternate and simple, ranging amongst the three species from 2 to 10 cm (0.79 to 3.94 in) long. The flowers are small, white or pink, with a five-lobed tubular corolla which is produced in mid-spring. The fruit is a dry capsule with numerous small seeds.

== Extant species ==
There are three species:

Flower	Name	Description	Distribution
	Epigaea asiatica (Iwanashi)	Leaves with an acutely pointed apex	Japan
	Epigaea gaultherioides	Leaves elliptical, leathery, base cordate, apex acuminate, petiole pubescent.	Georgia and northeastern Turkey
	Epigaea repens (Mayflower or trailing arbutus)	Leaves with a rounded or bluntly pointed apex.	Eastern North America

Epigaea repens is listed as an endangered species in some U.S. states.

== Symbolism ==
The name Mayflower was in tradition given to E. repens by the Pilgrim Fathers after their ship the Mayflower; the plant was abundant where the ship landed at Plymouth Rock, Massachusetts. For this reason, it was chosen to be the state flower of Massachusetts. It is also the provincial flower of Nova Scotia. The name Trailing Arbutus reflects its similarity to the trees in the related genus Arbutus, while being much smaller and prostrate on the ground.

== Cultivation and uses ==
All three species are grown as ornamental plants in rockeries, where they require moist, acidic soil. A hybrid between E. repens and E. asiatica, Epigaea × intertexta has also been developed for garden planting.
