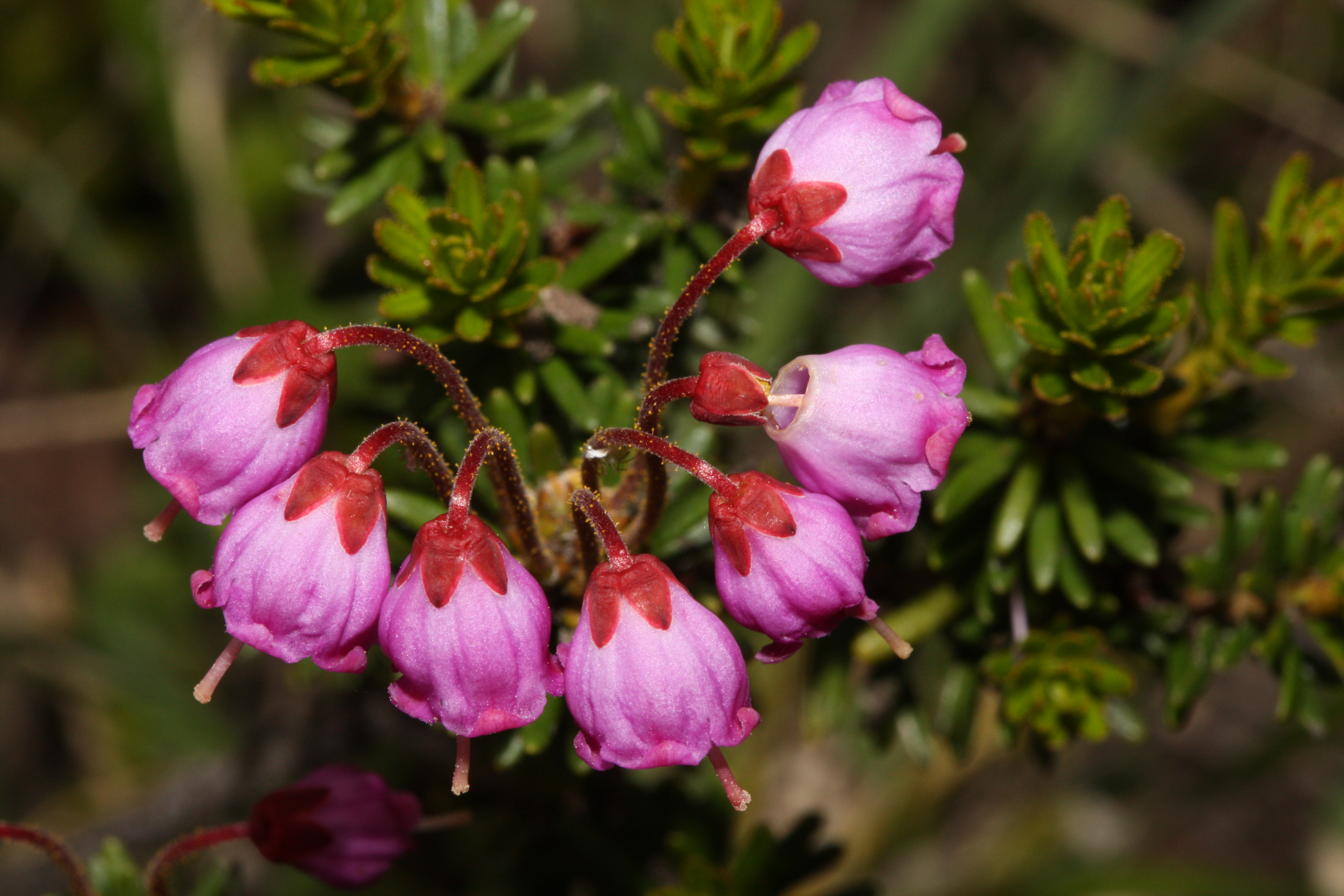
- Phyllodoce empetriformis

Scientific classification
- Kingdom: Plantae
- Clade: Embryophytes
- Clade: Tracheophytes
- Clade: Angiosperms
- Clade: Eudicots
- Clade: Asterids
- Order: Ericales
- Family: Ericaceae
- Subfamily: Ericoideae
- Tribe: Phyllodoceae
- Genus: Phyllodoce; Salisb.

Species
- 4 to 8, see text

= Phyllodoce (plant) =

Genus of flowering plants in the heath family

Phyllodoce (/fɪˈlɒdəsiː/, fi-LO-də-see) is a small genus of plants in the heather family, Ericaceae. They are known commonly as mountainheaths, mountain heaths, or mountain heathers. They are native to North America and Eurasia, where they have a circumboreal distribution.

== Description ==
Plants of this genus are subshrubs that occur in arctic-alpine regions. They often grow from rhizomes, the stem bases formed by clumps of old leaf stalks. They have erect or spreading stems, the new shoots covered in glandular hairs, the old ones bare, tough, and shreddy. The leaves are alternately arranged. They have narrow, leathery blades that roll under tightly at the edges. The inflorescence is a solitary flower or an array of up to 30. The flower has a cup- or bell-shaped corolla of five petals that are fused together for at least half their lengths. There are usually ten stamens, which sometimes protrude from the corolla. The fruit is a capsule containing over 100 tiny seeds.

== Species ==
There are four to seven or eight species in genus Phyllodoce. Even after detailed phylogenetic analyses the relationships between plants in this genus are still unclear.

Species include:

- Phyllodoce aleutica – Aleutian mountain heath
- Phyllodoce breweri – purple mountain heath, red mountain heather, Brewer's mountain heath
- Phyllodoce caerulea – blue mountain heath, purple mountain heather
- Phyllodoce empetriformis – pink mountain heath, red mountain heath
- Phyllodoce glanduliflora – yellow mountain heath

Hybrids between species also occur.

The name Phyllodoce belongs to one of the sea nymphs of Greek mythology.
