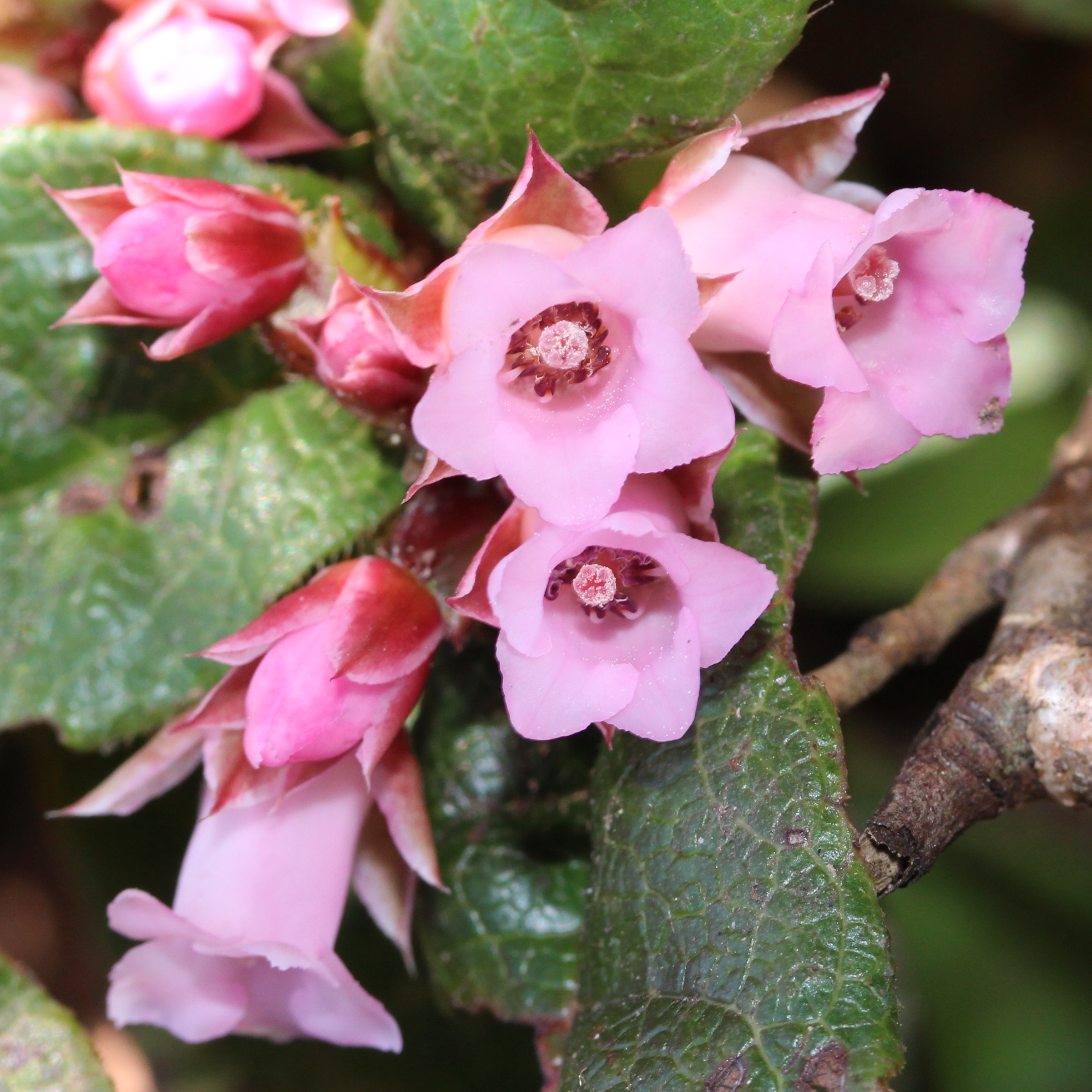

Scientific classification
- Kingdom: Plantae
- Clade: Tracheophytes
- Clade: Angiosperms
- Clade: Eudicots
- Clade: Asterids
- Order: Ericales
- Family: Ericaceae
- Genus: Epigaea
- Species: E. asiatica

Binomial name
- Epigaea asiatica Maxim.

Synonyms
- Homotypic Synonyms: Parapyrola asiatica (Maxim.) Kvaratskh.; Heterotypic Synonyms: Parapyrola trichocarpa Miq.

= Epigaea asiatica =

Species of flowering plant

Epigaea asiatica is a species of flowering plant in the family Ericaceae. It is endemic to Japan. It has pale pink flowers, and seeds that are dispersed by ants.

== Description ==
Epigaea asiatica is an evergreen shrub up to 0.1 m (0 ft 4 in) by 0.5 m (1 ft 8 in). It is hardy to zone (UK) 4. It is leafy all year round, in flower from April to May. The species is hermaphrodite (has male and female organs).

== Uses ==
The fruits of Epigaea asiatica, called iwanashi (katakana: イワナシ; kanji: 岩梨), which are harvested from the wild, are used in seasonal dishes in some parts of Japan.

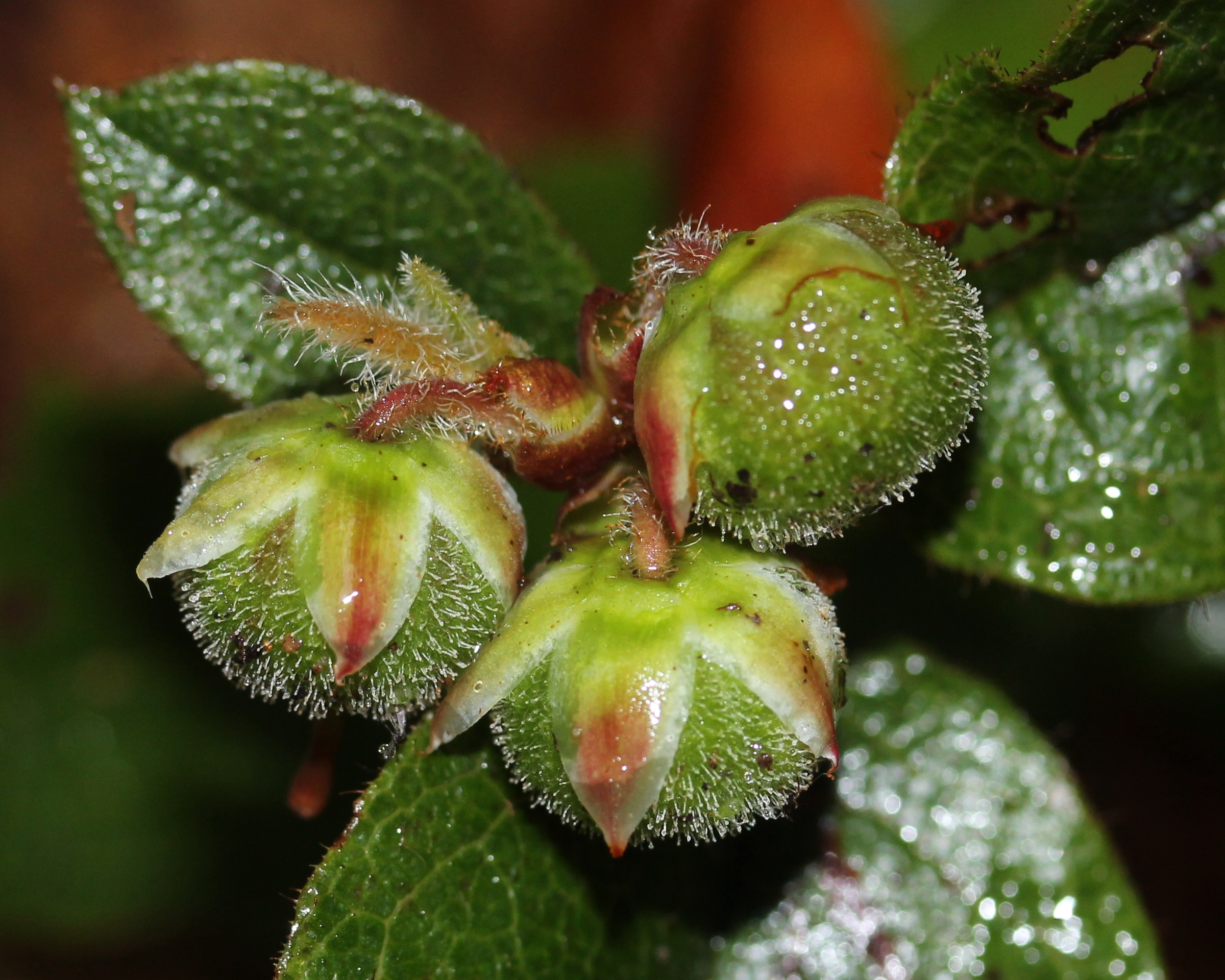
Fruits

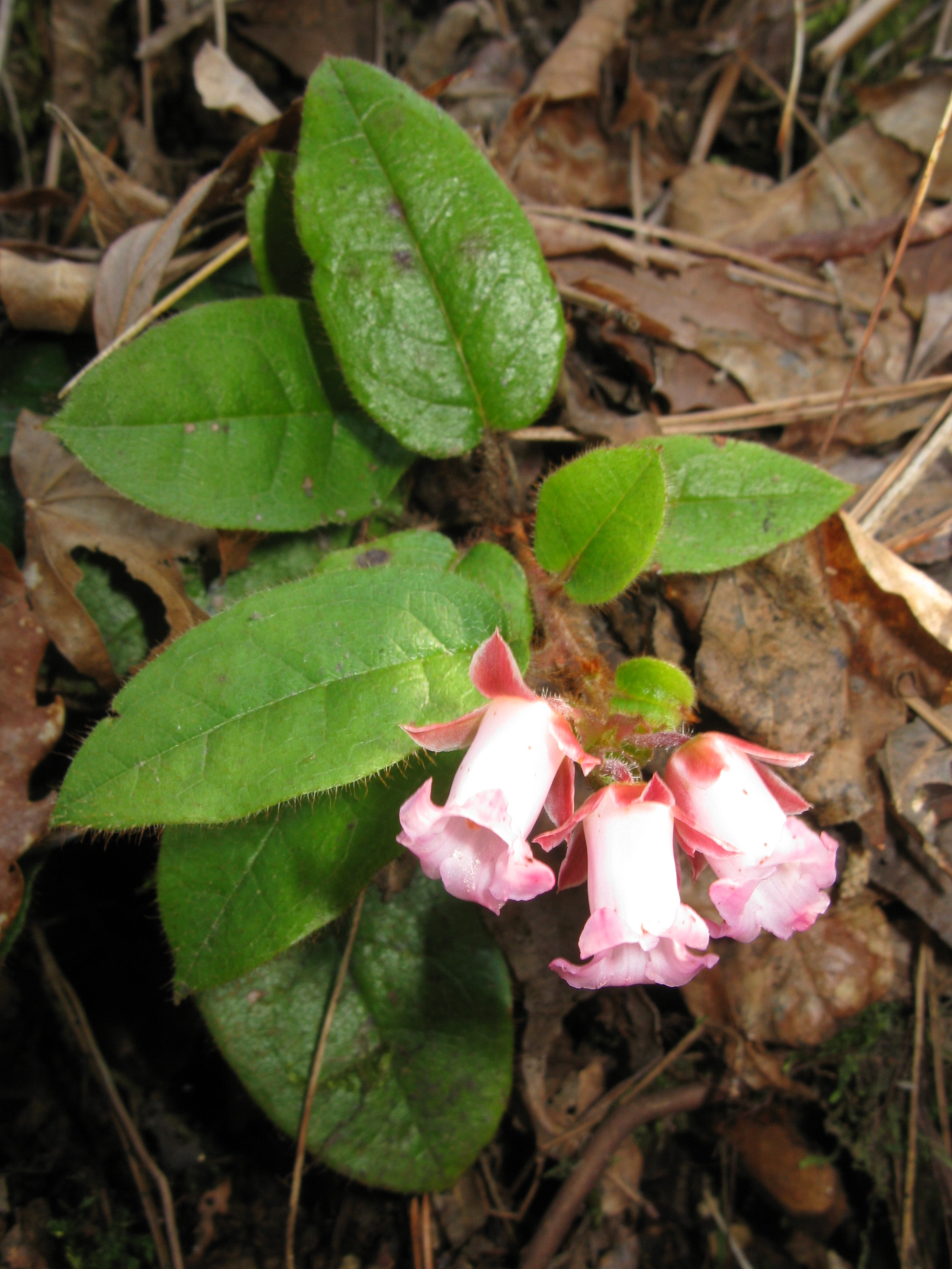
Plants

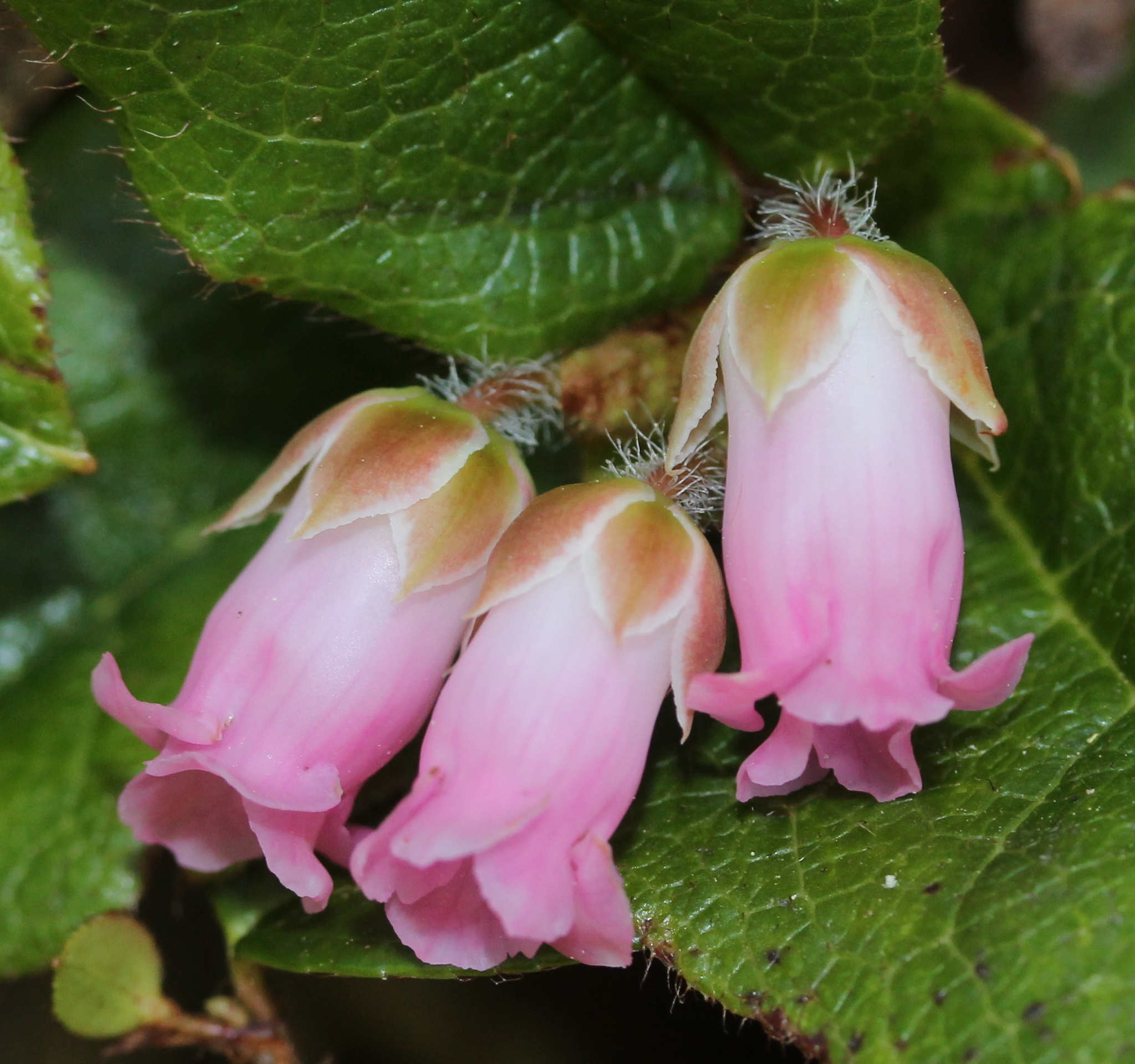
Flowers
