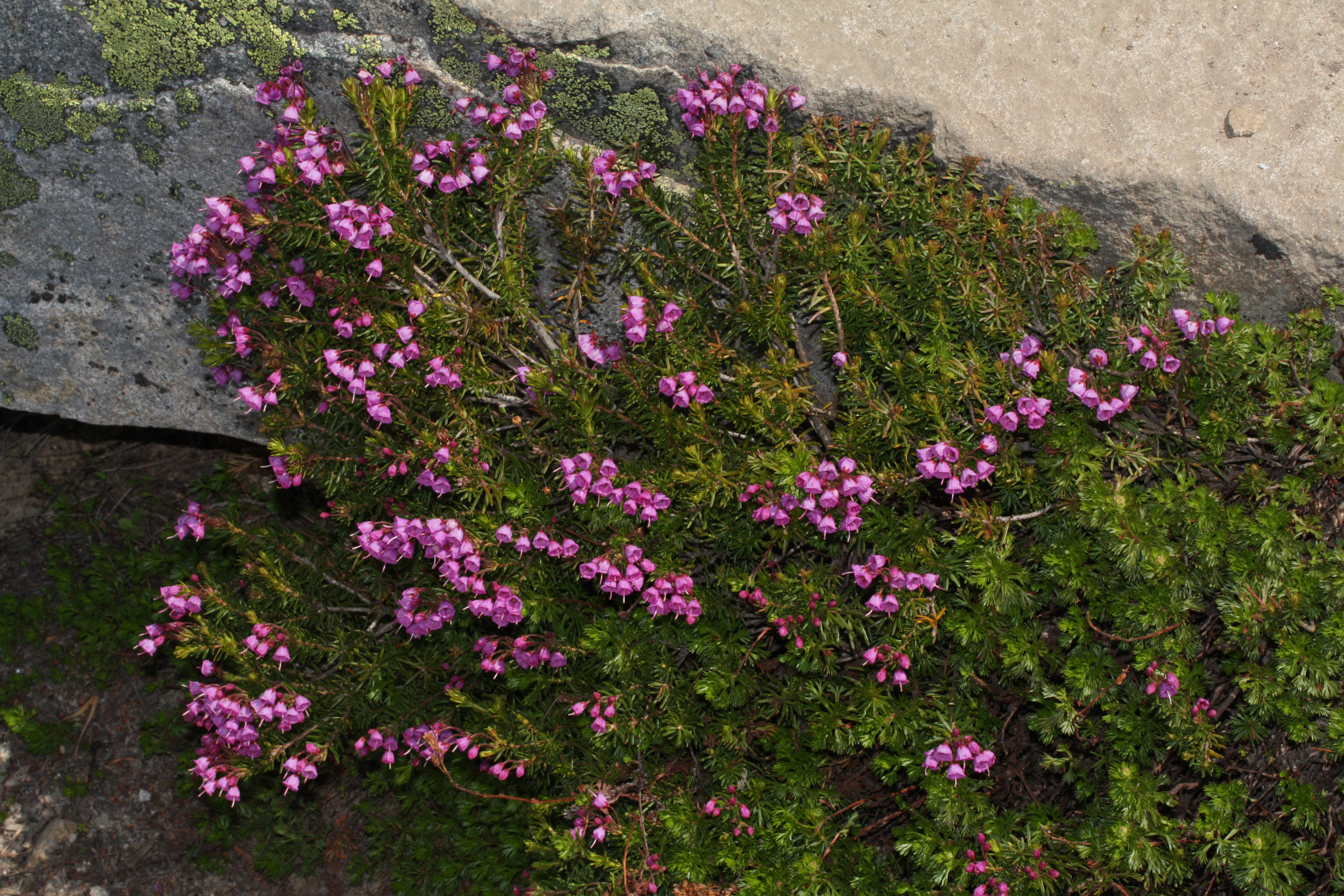

Scientific classification
- Kingdom: Plantae
- Clade: Tracheophytes
- Clade: Angiosperms
- Clade: Eudicots
- Clade: Asterids
- Order: Ericales
- Family: Ericaceae
- Genus: Phyllodoce
- Species: P. empetriformis

Binomial name
- Phyllodoce empetriformis (Sm.) D. Don

Synonyms
- Bryanthus empetriformis (Sm.) A.Gray; Menziesia empetriformis Sm.; Menziesia grahamii Hook.

= Phyllodoce empetriformis =

Species of flowering plant

Phyllodoce empetriformis, also known by the common name pink mountain heather, is a flowering plant species in the family Ericaceae which is found in alpine environments in the Rocky Mountains of the Northwestern United States and Western Canada. It is a low matting shrub with distinctive, needle-like evergreen leaves and gets its name from its attractive bell-shaped flowers in shades of red, pink, and purple.

P. empetriformis is one of the parents of the artificial hybrid × Phyllothamnus erectus, the other being Rhodothamnus chamaecistus.

== Description ==
This common evergreen alpine shrub bears a red-purple flower clustered at the end of the stem. The flowers of Phyllodoce empetriformis can grow in clusters of many to as little as one. The leaves alternate on the stem and roll under themselves so tightly they resemble pine needles. It is a fairly short shrub that grows from 10–40 cm tall. The dwarf shrub can survive in subalpine to alpine regions because of its ability to minimize water loss through evaporation. It thrives under heavy snow cover which then waters the plant in the summer when the snow melts.

== Importance ==
Phyllodoce empetriformis is helpful in eliminating mountainous soil erosion. The heather acts as a mountain canopy and collects stone-free soil either from the wind or that has been washed in. This stimulates vegetative growth which may take up to one hundred years to reach full mature status. Pink mountain heather is easily damaged by natural causes such as a dry winter. It can also be affected by humans like getting stepped on. This can result in a decrease of coverage on a mountain and any slight wind can erode the loose sediment away.

== Similar species ==
Pink mountain heather is often mistaken for Empetrum nigrum (crowberry), although Phyllodoce empetriformis does not produce berries. A closely related species is the Phyllodoce glanduliflora (yellow mountain heather). This species can be identified by its yellow, urn-shaped flowers. Pink and yellow mountain heather can form a hybrid called Phyllodoce intermedia which produces flowers that are white with pink sepals.

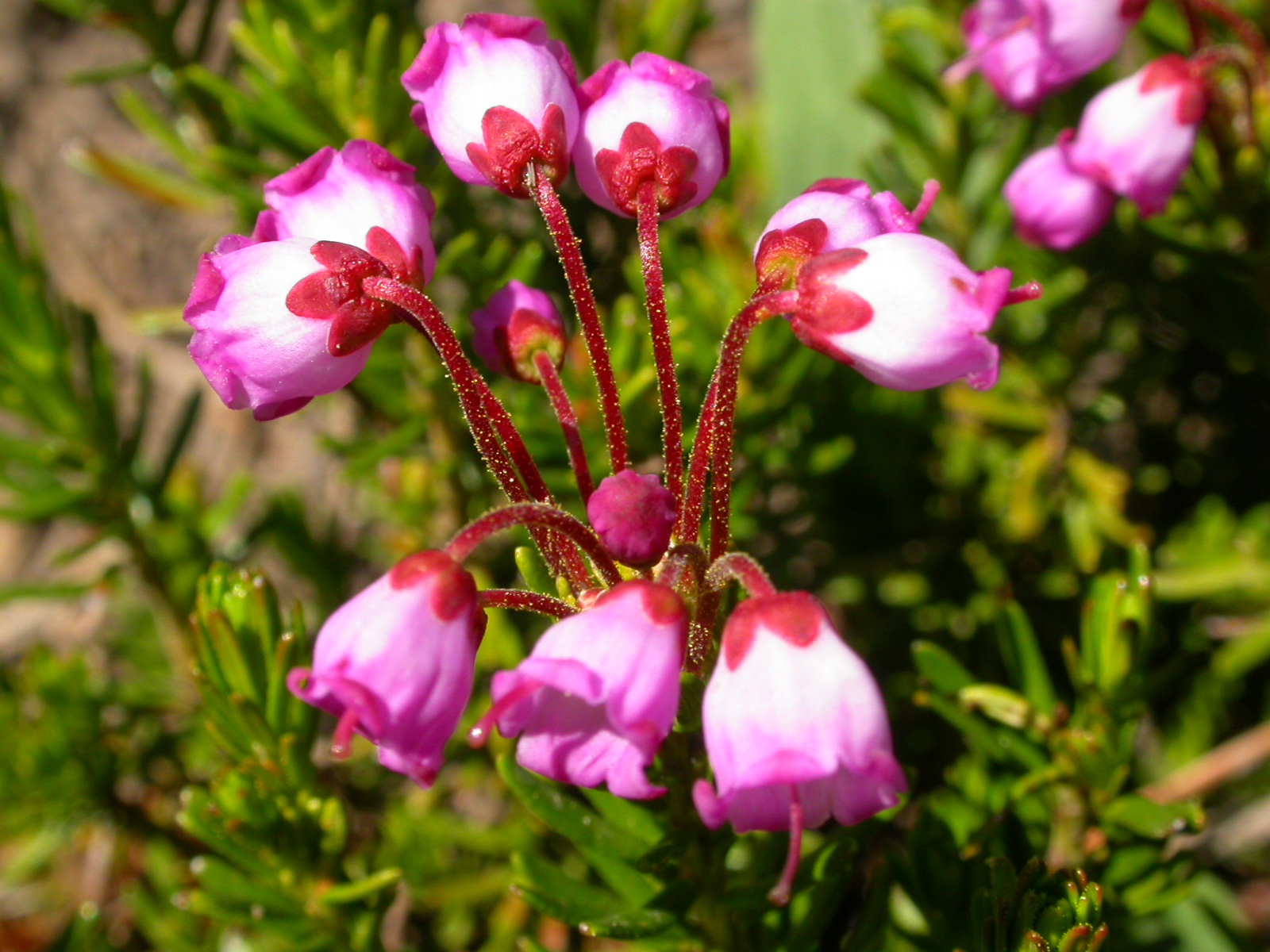
Pink mountain heather close up

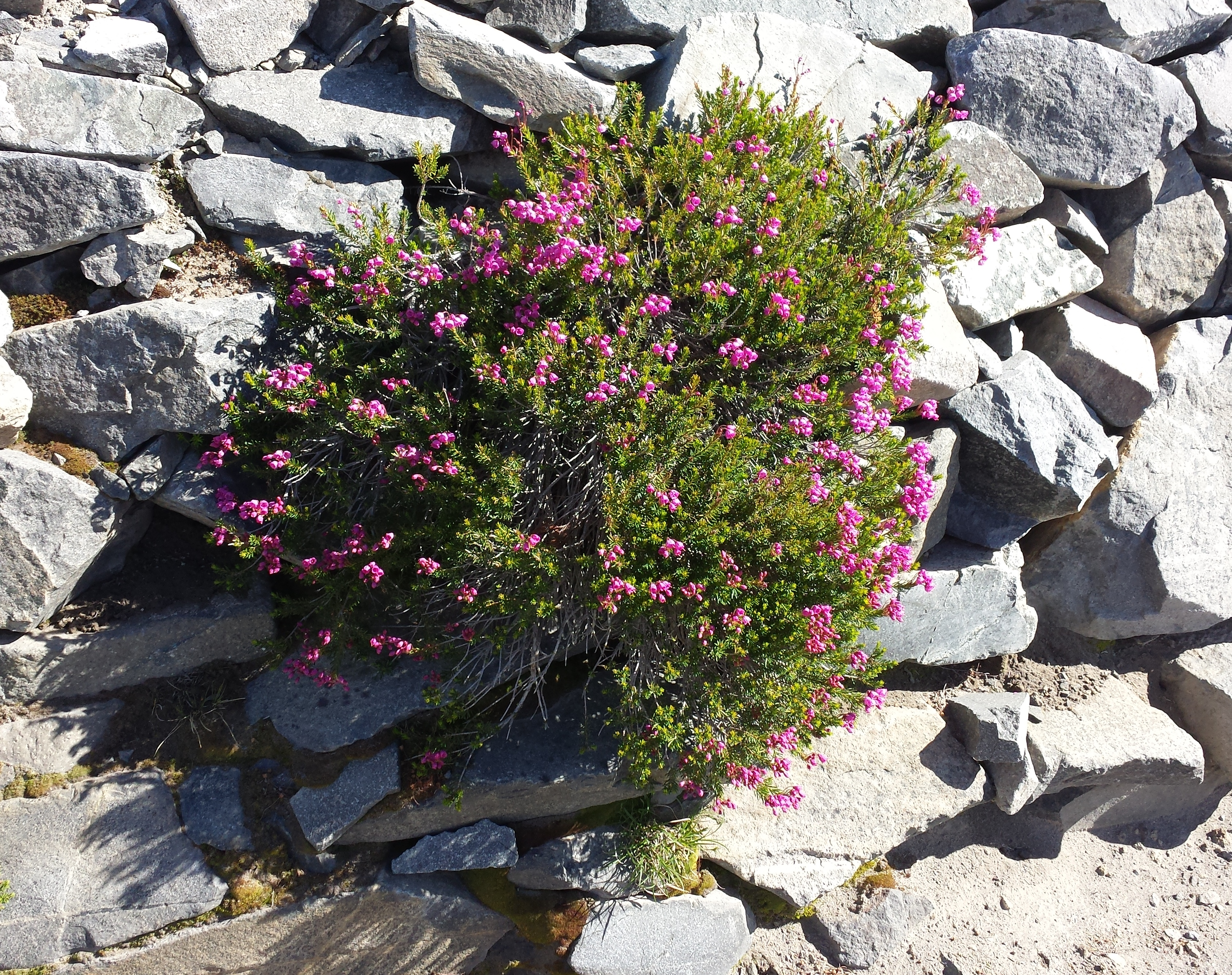
Pink mountain heather adapting to environment

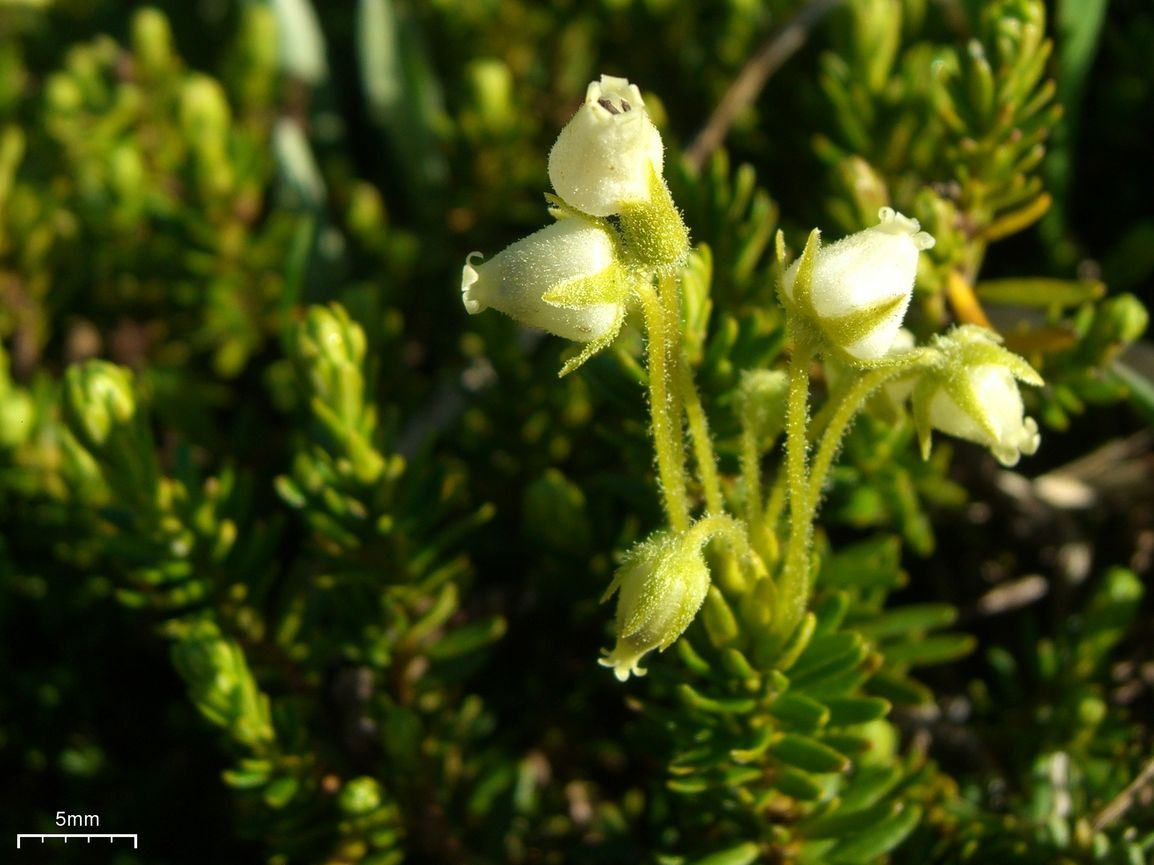
Yellow mountain heather
