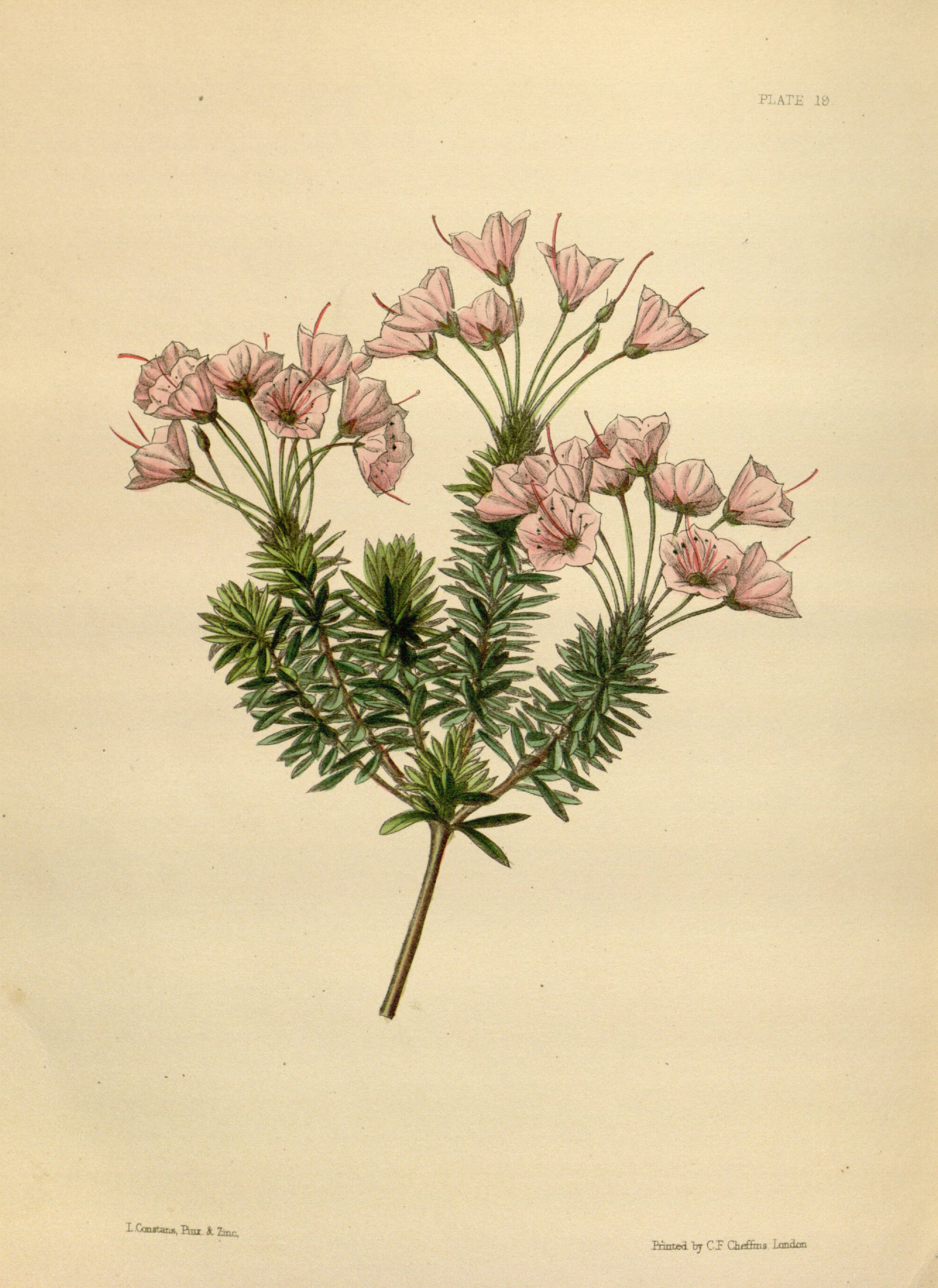
- Botanical illustration of × Phyllothamnus erectus (as Bryanthus × erectus) from Paxton's Flower Garden, volume 1, plate 19

Scientific classification
- Kingdom: Plantae
- Clade: Tracheophytes
- Clade: Angiosperms
- Clade: Eudicots
- Clade: Asterids
- Order: Ericales
- Family: Ericaceae
- Subfamily: Ericoideae
- Tribe: Phyllodoceae
- Genus: × Phyllothamnus; C.K.Schneid.
- Species: × P. erectus

Binomial name
- × Phyllothamnus erectus (Lindl. & Paxt.) C.K.Schneid.

Synonyms
- Bryanthus × erectus Lindl. & Paxt.; Menziesia × erecta (Lindl. & Paxt.) Lem. Phyllodoce × erecta (Lindl. & Paxt.) Drude

= × Phyllothamnus =

Hybrid genus of flowering plant

× Phyllothamnus is a hybrid genus in the family Ericaceae with one known species, × Phyllothamnus erectus, an artificial hybrid between Phyllodoce empetriformis and Rhodothamnus chamaecistus, first described in 1850 as Bryanthus × erectus.
