= Costa de Prata =

Region in Central Western Portugal

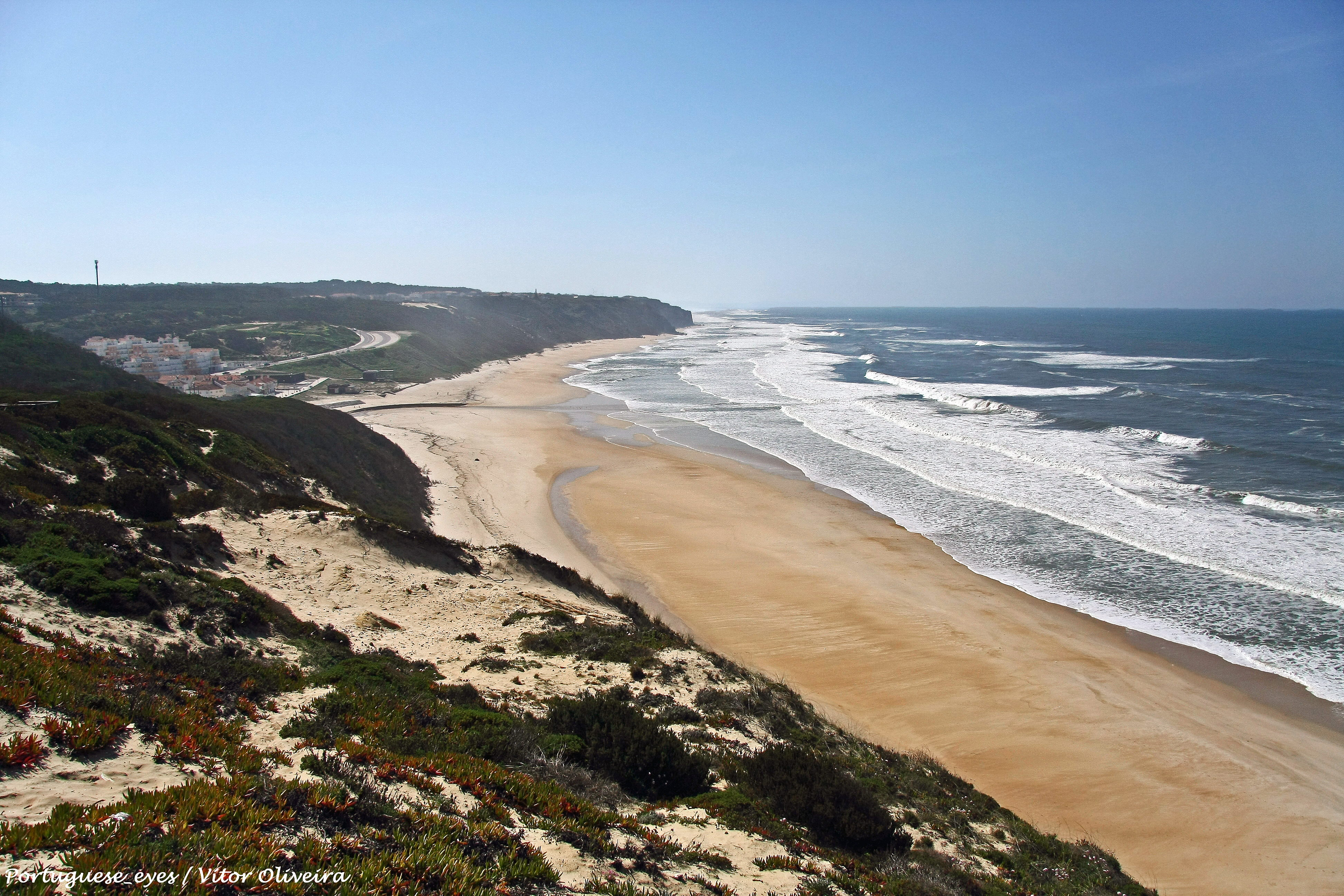
Paredes da Vitória Beach, near Marinha Grande

Costa de Prata ("Silver Coast") is a region in Central Western Portugal that consists of beaches and fishing towns stretching from Barrinha de Esmoriz to Santa Cruz, with a length of approximately 240 km (150 mi). It is bordered by Costa Verde in the north and Costa de Lisboa in the south.

== Climate ==
It has a warm-summer Mediterranean climate similar to that of Coastal California.
