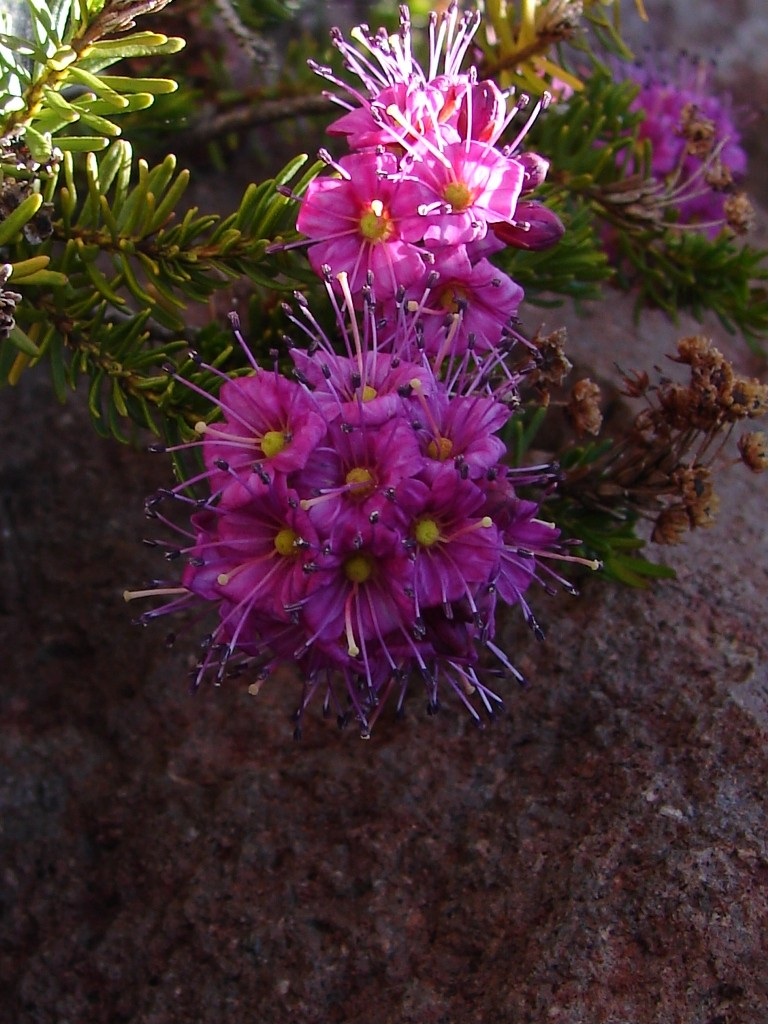

Scientific classification
- Kingdom: Plantae
- Clade: Tracheophytes
- Clade: Angiosperms
- Clade: Eudicots
- Clade: Asterids
- Order: Ericales
- Family: Ericaceae
- Genus: Phyllodoce
- Species: P. breweri

Binomial name
- Phyllodoce breweri (A.Gray) A.Heller

= Phyllodoce breweri =

Species of flowering plant

Phyllodoce breweri is a species of flowering plant in the family Ericaceae known by the common names purple mountain heath and Brewer's mountain heather.

It is native to California, where it can be found in mountain ranges including the southern Cascade Range, the San Bernardino Mountains, and the Sierra Nevada, its distribution extending into Nevada. It grows in rocky subalpine mountain habitat, such as slopes and meadows.

== Description ==
Phyllodoce breweri is a matlike shrub with many short stems lined densely with leathery evergreen needlelike leaves.

The inflorescence is a cluster of several flowers toward the ends of the stems, with some flowers occurring below in leaf axils. The bright purple-pink flowers are cup-shaped as the petals are fused except for the very tips, which roll under. At the center of the flower is a yellow ovary and ten long, protruding stamens tipped with large anthers.
