= Ledothamnus =

Scientific classification
- Kingdom: Plantae
- Clade: Tracheophytes
- Clade: Angiosperms
- Clade: Eudicots
- Clade: Asterids
- Order: Ericales
- Family: Ericaceae
- Tribe: Bryantheae
- Genus: Ledothamnus; Meisn.

Genus of plants

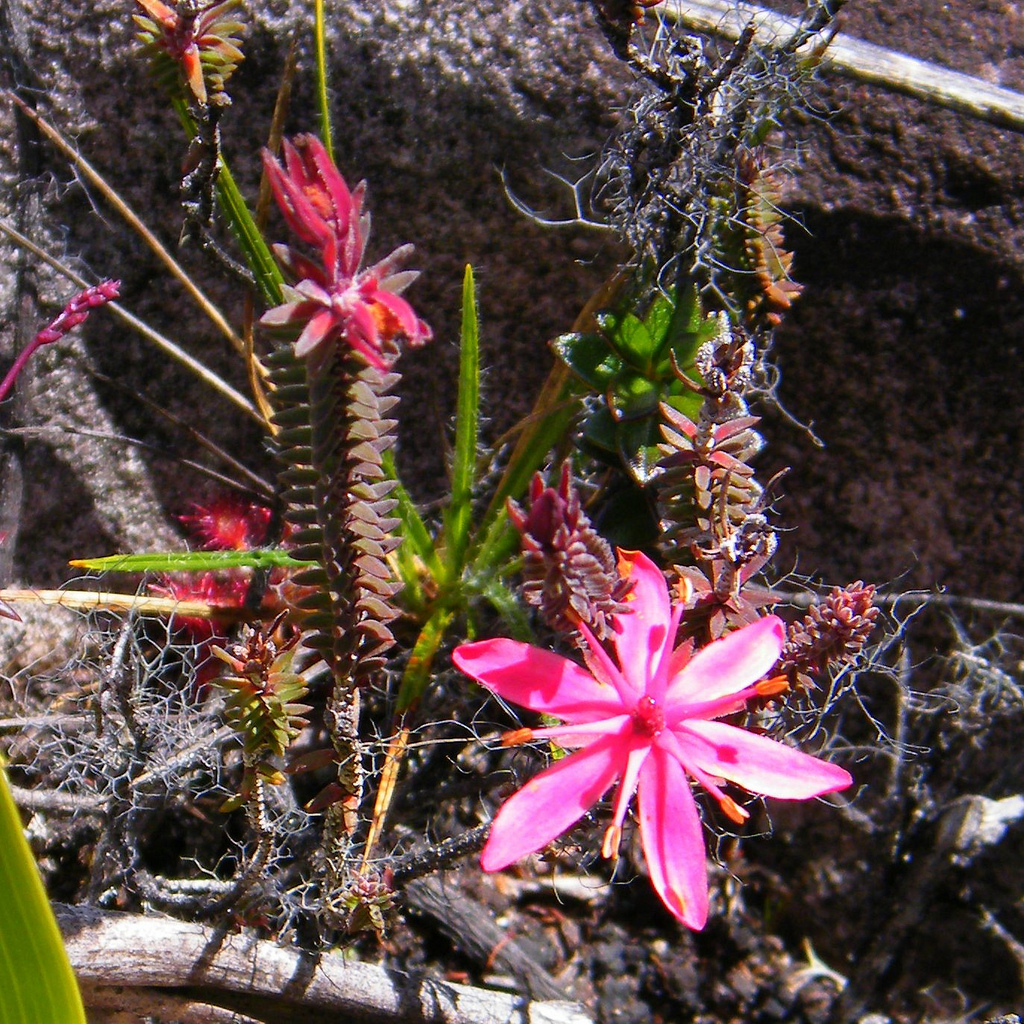
Ledothamnus sessiliflorus flower

Ledothamnus is a genus of flowering plants belonging to the family Ericaceae. Six of the seven species of Ledothamnus are recorded from restricted distributions on the summits of tepuis in the Guayana Highlands in Bolívar and Amazonas states of Venezuela. One species, L. guyanensis is more widespread throughout much of Venezuelan Guayana and adjacent Brazil.

In 2012, the new tribe Bryantheae was proposed based on genetic analysis, comprising Ledothamnus and the monotypic genus Bryanthus, which is native to Japan, Kamchatka and the Kuril Islands.

Species:

- Ledothamnus atroadenus Maguire, Steyerm. & Luteyn – Chimantá Massif, Bolívar State, Venezuela
- Ledothamnus decumbens Maguire, Steyerm. & Luteyn – Chimantá Massif, Bolívar State
- Ledothamnus guyanensis Meisn. – endemic to Venezuelan Guayana and adjacent Brazil, absent from Chimantá Massif
- Ledothamnus jauaensis Maguire, Steyerm. & Luteyn – Cerro Sarisariñama, Bolívar State
- Ledothamnus luteus Maguire, Steyerm. & Luteyn – Chimantá Massif, Bolívar State
- Ledothamnus parviflorus Gleason – Cerro Duida, Amazonas State
- Ledothamnus sessiliflorus N.E.Br. – vicinity of Mount Roraima, border of Bolívar State, Guyana and Brazil
