= List of garden plants in North America =

This is a partial list of garden plants, plants that can be cultivated in gardens in North America, listed alphabetically by genus.

== A ==
- Abelia
- Abeliophyllum (white forsythia)
- Abelmoschus (okra)
- Abies (fir)
- Abroma
- Abromeitiella (obsolete)
- Abronia (sand verbena)
- Abrus
- Abutilon
- Acacia (wattle)
- Acaena
- Acalypha
- Acanthaceae
- Acanthodium
- Acantholimon
- Acanthopale
- Acanthophoenix
- Acanthus
- Acca
- Acer (maple)
- Achariaceae
- Achillea (yarrow)
- Achimenantha (hybrid genus)
- Achimenes
- Acinos (calamint)
- Aciphylla
- Acmena
- Acoelorraphe (saw palm)
- Acokanthera
- Aconitum (aconite, monkshood)
- Acorus
- Acradenia
- Acrocomia
- Actaea (baneberry)
- Actinidia (kiwifruit)
- Ada orchid genus
- Adansonia
- Adenandra
- Adenanthos
- Adenia
- Adenium
- Adenocarpus
- Adenophora
- Adenostoma
- Adiantum (maidenhair fern)
- Adlumia
- Adonis
- Adromischus
- Aechmea
- Aegopodium
- Aeonium
- Aerangis (an orchid genus)
- Aerides (an orchid genus)
- Aeschynanthus
- Aesculus
- Aethionema
- Afgekia
- Agapanthus
- Agapetes
- Agastache
- Agathis
- Agathosma
- Agave
- Ageratum
- Aglaia
- Aglaomorpha
- Aglaonema
- Agonis
- Agrimonia
- Agrostemma (corn cockle)
- Agrostis
- Aichryson
- Ailanthus (tree of heaven, etc.)
- Aiphanes
- Aira (hair grass)
- Ajania
- Ajuga (bugleweed)
- Akebia
- Alangium
- Alberta
- Albizia (silk tree)
- Albuca
- Alcea (hollyhock)
- Alchemilla
- Aldrovanda
- Aleurites
- × Aliceara (hybrid genus)
- Alisma (water plantain)
- Alkanna
- Allagoptera
- Allamanda
- Allium (onion)
- Allocasuarina
- Allosyncarpia
- Alloxylon
- Alluaudia
- Alnus (alder)
- Alocasia
- Aloe
- Aloinopsis
- Alonsoa
- Alopecurus (foxtail grass)
- Aloysia
- Alphitonia
- Alpinia (ginger lily)
- Alsobia
- Alstonia
- Alstroemeria
- Alternanthera
- Althaea
- Alyogyne
- Alyssum
- Alyxia
- Amaranthus
- Amarcrinum (hybrid genus)
- Amarygia (hybrid genus)
- Amaryllis
- Amberboa
- Amelanchier
- Amesiella
- Amherstia
- Amicia
- Ammi
- Ammobium
- Amorpha
- Amorphophallus
- Ampelopsis
- Amsonia
- Anacampseros
- Anacardium
- Anacyclus
- Anagallis (pimpernel)
- Ananas (pineapple)
- Anaphalis
- Anchusa
- Andersonia
- Andira
- Androlepis
- Andromeda
- Andropogon
- Androsace
- Anemone (windflower)
- Anemonella
- Anemonopsis
- Anemopaegma
- Anethum (dill)
- Angelica
- Angelonia
- Angiopteris
- Angophora
- Angraecum (an orchid genus)
- Anguloa (an orchid genus)
- Angulocaste (a hybrid orchid genus)
- Anigozanthos
- Anisacanthus
- Anisodontea
- Annona
- Anoda
- Anomatheca (See Freesia)
- Anopterus
- Anredera
- Antennaria
- Anthemis
- Anthericum
- Anthocleista
- Anthotroche
- Anthriscus
- Anthurium
- Anthyllis
- Antidesma
- Antigonon
- Antirrhinum (snapdragon)
- Apera
- Aphelandra
- Aphyllanthes
- Apium
- Apocynum
- Aponogeton
- Apophyllum
- Apodytes
- Aponogeton
- Aporocactus
- Aporoheliocereus (hybrid genus)
- Aprevalia
- Aptenia, synonym of Mesembryanthemum
- Aquilegia (columbine)
- Arabis (rock cress)
- Arachis
- Arachniodes
- Arachnis (scorpion orchid) (orchid genus)
- Araeococcus
- Araiostegia
- Aralia
- Araucaria (monkey-puzzle)
- Araujia
- Arbutus (madrone)
- Archidendron
- Archontophoenix (king palm)
- Arctium
- Arctostaphylos (bearberry, manzanita)
- Arctotheca
- Arctotis (African daisy)
- Ardisia
- Areca
- Arenaria (sandwort)
- Arenga
- Argemone (prickly poppy)
- Argyranthemum
- Argyreia
- Argyroderma
- Ariocarpus
- Arisaema
- Arisarum
- Aristea
- Aristolochia
- Aristotelia
- Armeria
- Armoracia
- Arnebia
- Arnica
- Aronia (chokeberry)
- Arrabidaea, see Bignonia magnifica
- Arrhenatherum (oat grass)
- Artanema
- Artabotrys
- Artemisia (mugwort, sagebrush, wormwood)
- Arthrocereus
- Arthropodium
- Artocarpus
- Arum
- Aruncus
- Arundina
- Arundinaria
- Arundo
- Asarina
- Asarum (wild ginger)
- Asclepias (milkweed, silkweed)
- × Ascocenda (hybrid genus) (an orchid genus)
- Ascocentrum an orchid genus
- Asimina
- Asparagus
- Asperula (woodruff)
- Asphodeline
- Asphodelus (asphodel)
- Aspidistra
- Asplenium
- Astelia
- Aster
- Asteranthera
- Astilbe
- Astilboides
- Astragalus (milk vetch)
- Astrantia
- Astrophytum
- Asystasia
- Atalaya
- Athamanta
- Atherosperma
- Athrotaxis
- Athyrium
- Atriplex
- Attalea
- Aubrieta
- Aucuba
- Aulax
- Auranticarpa
- Aurinia
- Austrocedrus
- Austrocylindropuntia
- Austrostipa
- Averrhoa
- Avicennia
- Azadirachta
- Azalea
- Azara
- Azolla (aquatic ferns)
- Azorella
- Azorina
- Aztekium

== B ==
- Babiana
- Baccharis
- Backhousia
- Bacopa (water hyssop)
- Bactris
- Baeckea
- Baikiaea
- Baileya
- Ballota
- Balsamorhiza (balsam root)
- Bambusa (bamboo)
- Banksia
- Baptisia an orchid genus
- Barbarea (yellow rocket or winter cress)
- Barkeria (an orchid genus)
- Barleria
- Barklya (gold blossom tree)
- Barnadesia
- Barringtonia
- Bartlettina
- Basselinia
- Bassia
- Bauera
- Bauhinia
- Baumea
- × Beallara an orchid hybrid genus
- Beaucarnea
- Beaufortia
- Beaumontia
- Beccariella
- Bedfordia
- Begonia
- Belamcanda
- Bellevalia
- Bellis (daisy)
- Bellium
- Berberidopsis
- Berberis (barberry)
- Berchemia
- Bergenia
- Bergerocactus
- Berkheya
- Berlandiera
- Berrya
- Bertolonia
- Berzelia
- Beschorneria
- Bessera
- Beta (beet)
- Betula (birch)
- Biarum
- Bidens
- Bignonia
- Bikkia
- Billardiera
- Billbergia
- Bischofia
- Bismarckia
- Bixa
- Blandfordia
- Blechnum (hard fern)
- Bletilla (an orchid genus)
- Blighia
- Bloomeria
- Blossfeldia
- Bocconia
- Boenninghausenia
- Bolax
- Bolbitis
- Bollea (an orchid genus)
- Boltonia
- Bolusanthus
- Bomarea
- Bombax
- Bongardia
- Boophone
- Borago
- Borassodendron
- Borassus
- Boronia
- Bosea
- Bossiaea
- Bothriochloa
- Bougainvillea
- Bouteloua
- Bouvardia
- Bowenia
- Bowiea
- Bowkeria
- Boykinia
- Brabejum
- Brachychiton
- Brachyglottis
- Brachylaena
- Brachypodium
- Brachyscome
- Brachysema
- Brachystelma
- Bracteantha
- Brahea (hesper palm)
- Brassavola (an orchid genus)
- Brassaia (octopus tree)
- Brassia (an orchid genus)
- Brassica (mustard, cabbage)
- × Brassidium (hybrid orchids)
- × Brassocattleya (hybrid orchids)
- × Brassolaeliocattleya (trigeneric hybrid orchids)
- Breynia
- Brillantaisia
- Brimeura
- Briza (quaking grass)
- Brodiaea
- Bromelia
- Broughtonia an orchid genus
- Broussonetia
- Browallia
- Brownea
- Browningia
- Bruckenthalia
- Brugmansia
- Brunfelsia
- Brunia
- Brunnera
- Brunsvigia
- Brya
- Buchloe
- Buckinghamia
- Buddleja
- Buglossoides
- Bulbine
- Bulbinella
- Bulbocodium
- Bulbophyllum (an orchid genus)
- Bulnesia
- Bunchosia
- Buphthalmum
- Bupleurum
- Burchardia
- Burchellia
- × Burrageara an orchid hybrid genus
- Burretiokentia
- Bursaria
- Bursera
- Burtonia
- Butea
- Butia
- Butomus
- Buxus (boxwood)
- Byrsonima
- Bystropogon

== C ==
- Cabomba
- Cadia
- Caesalpinia (dwarf poinciana, Pride of Barbados)
- Caladium
- Calamagrostis (reed grass, smallweed)
- Calamintha (calamint)
- Calamus
- Calandrinia
- Calanthe an orchid genus
- Calathea
- Calceolaria (slipperwort)
- Calendula (pot marigold)
- Calibanus
- Calibrachoa
- Calla
- Calliandra
- Callianthemum
- Callicarpa (beauty berry)
- Callicoma (black wattle)
- Callirhoe (poppy mallow)
- Callisia
- Callistemon (bottlebrush)
- Callistephus (Chinese aster)
- Callitriche (water starwort)
- Callitris (cypress pine)
- Calluna (heather)
- Calocedrus (incense cedar)
- Calochone
- Calochortus
- Calodendrum (cape chestnut)
- Calomeria
- Calophaca
- Calophyllum
- Calopyxis
- Caloscordum
- Calothamnus
- Calotropis
- Calpurnia
- Caltha (kingcup, marsh marigold)
- Calycanthus
- Calymmanthium
- Calypso (an orchid genus)
- Calytrix (starflower)
- Camassia (quamash)
- Camellia
- Camoensia
- Campanula (bellflower)
- Campsis (trumpet vine)
- Campylotropis (See Lespedeza)
- Cananga (ylang ylang)
- Canarina
- Canistrum
- Canna
- Cantua
- Capparis
- Capsicum (pepper)
- Caragana (peashrub)
- Caralluma
- Cardamine (bittercress)
- Cardiocrinum
- Cardiospermum
- Cardwellia
- Carex (sedge)
- Carissa
- Carlina
- Carludovica
- Carmichaelia
- Carnegiea (saguaro)
- Carpentaria
- Carphalea
- Carpinus (hornbeam)
- Carpobrotus
- Carthamus (safflower)
- Carum (caraway)
- Carya (hickory, pecan)
- Caryopteris
- Caryota (fishtail palm)
- Cassia (shower tree)
- Cassinia
- Cassiope
- Cassipourea
- Castanea (chestnut)
- Castanopsis
- Castanospermum (black bean)
- Casuarina (sheoak)
- Catalpa (Indian bean)
- Catananche
- Catasetum (an orchid genus)
- Catha (khat tree)
- Catharanthus (Madagascar periwinkle)
- Catopsis
- Cattleya (an orchid genus)
- Caulophyllum
- Cautleya
- Cavendishia
- Ceanothus (California-lilac)
- Cedrela (toon)
- Cedronella
- Cedrus (cedar)
- Ceiba (kapok)
- Celastrus (staff-vine)
- Celmisia (New Zealand daisy, New Zealand aster)
- Celosia (cockscomb)
- Celtis (hackberry)
- Centaurea
- Centaurium
- Centradenia
- Centranthus (valerian)
- Cephalaria
- Cephalocereus
- Cephalophyllum
- Cephalotaxus (plum-yew)
- Ceraria
- Cerastium
- Ceratonia (St. John's bread, carob bean)
- Ceratopetalum (coachwood)
- Ceratophyllum
- Ceratopteris
- Ceratostigma
- Ceratozamia
- Cerbera (sea mango)
- Cercidiphyllum
- Cercis (Judas tree, redbud)
- Cercocarpus
- Cereus
- Ceropegia
- Cestrum
- Chadsia
- Chaenomeles (flowering quince)
- Chaenorhinum (dwarf snapdragon)
- Chaerophyllum
- Chamaecyparis (false cypress)
- Chamaecytisus
- Chamaedaphne
- Chamaedorea
- Chamaelirium
- Chamaemelum (chamomile)
- Chamaerops
- Chamelaucium (wax flower)
- Chasmanthe
- Chasmanthium
- Cheilanthes
- Cheiridopsis
- Chelidonium
- Chelone (turtlehead)
- Chiastophyllum
- Chiliotrichum
- Chilopsis (desert willow)
- Chimaphila
- Chimonanthus (wintersweet)
- Chimonobambusa
- Chionanthus (fringe tree)
- Chionochloa
- Chirita
- Chlidanthus
- Choisya
- Chonemorpha (Frangipani vine)
- Choricarpia (brush turpentine)
- Chorisia (floss silk tree)
- Chorizema
- Chrysalidocarpus
- Chrysanthemoides
- Chrysanthemum
- Chrysobalanus
- Chrysogonum
- Chrysolepis
- Chrysophyllum (star apple)
- Chrysothemis
- Chusquea
- Cibotium
- Cicerbita
- Cichorium (chicory, endive)
- Cimicifuga (bugbane)
- Cinnamomum (camphor laurel)
- Cionura
- Cirsium
- Cissus
- Cistus (rock rose, sun rose)
- Citharexylum (fiddlewood)
- Citrofortunella (hybrid)
- Citrus (lime, lemon)
- Cladanthus
- Cladrastis
- Clarkia
- Claytonia
- Cleistocactus
- Clematis
- Cleome (spider flower)
- Clerodendrum
- Clethra (summersweet)
- Cleyera
- Clianthus
- Clintonia
- Clitoria
- Clivia
- Clusia
- Clytostoma
- Cobaea
- Coccoloba (sea grape)
- Coccothrinax (thatch palm)
- Cocculus
- Cochlioda an orchid genus – synonym of Oncidium
- Cochlospermum (buttercup tree, Maximiliana)
- Cocos (coconut)
- Codiaeum (croton)
- Codonanthe
- Codonopsis
- Coelia
- Coelogyne (an orchid genus)
- Coffea (coffee tree)
- Coix
- Colchicum (autumn crocus, meadow saffron)
- Coleonema
- Colletia
- Collinsia
- Collomia
- Colocasia (taro)
- Colquhounia
- Columnea
- Colutea (bladder senna)
- Coluteocarpus
- Colvillea
- Combretum
- Comesperma
- Commelina (day flower, spiderwort, widow's tears)
- Commersonia
- Commidendrum
- Commiphora
- Comptonella
- Comptonia (Sweetfern)
- Conandron
- Congea
- Conicosia
- Coniogramme
- Conoclinium (mistflower)
- Conophytum
- Conospermum
- Conostylis
- Conradina
- Consolida (larkspur)
- Convallaria (lily-of-the-valley)
- Convolvulus (bindweed, morning glory)
- Copernicia (caranda palm, wax palm)
- Copiapoa syn. Pilocopiapoa
- Coprosma
- Coptis (goldthread)
- Cordia (bird lime tree)
- Cordyline
- Coreopsis (tickseed)
- Coriandrum (coriander cilantro)
- Coriaria
- Cornus (dogwood, cornel)
- Corokia
- Coronilla
- Correa
- Corryocactus
- Cortaderia (pampas grass, tussock grass)
- Cortusa
- Corybas (helmet orchid)
- Corydalis
- Corylopsis (winter-hazel)
- Corylus (hazel, filbert)
- Corymbia
- Corynocarpus
- Corypha
- Coryphantha
- Cosmos
- Costus
- Cotinus (smoke bush)
- Cotoneaster
- Cotula (brass buttons)
- Cotyledon
- Couroupita (cannonball tree)
- Crambe
- Craspedia
- Crassula
- + Crataegomespilus (graft chimera)
- Crataegus (hawthorn)
- × Crataemespilus (hybrid)
- Crepis
- Crescentia (calabash)
- Crinodendron
- Crinum
- Crocosmia (falling stars, montbretia)
- Crocus
- Crossandra (firecracker flower)
- Crotalaria (rattlepod)
- Croton
- Crowea
- Cryptanthus (earth stars)
- Cryptbergia (hybrid)
- Cryptocarya
- Cryptocoryne (water trumpet)
- Cryptomeria (sugi, Japanese cedar)
- Cryptostegia (Indian rubber vine)
- Cryptotaenia
- Ctenanthe
- Cucumis
- Cucurbita
- Cuminum
- Cunila
- Cunninghamia (China-fir)
- Cunonia
- Cupaniopsis (tuckeroo)
- Cuphea
- Cupressus (cypress)
- Cuprocyparis (hybrid)
- Curcuma
- Cussonia
- Cyananthus (trailing bellflower)
- Cyanotis
- Cyathea (tree fern)
- Cyathodes
- Cybistax
- Cycas (cycad, sago palm)
- Cyclamen
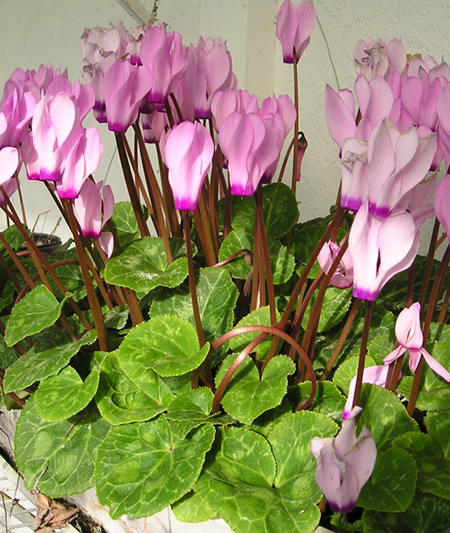
  Pink cyclamen
- Cycnoches an orchid genus
- Cydista, synonym of Bignonia
- Cydonia (quince)
- Cylindropuntia
- Cymbalaria (ivy-leaved toadflax)
- Cymbidium (an orchid genus)
- Cymbopogon
- Cynara
- Cynodon
- Cynoglossum (hound's tongue)
- Cypella
- Cyperus
- Cyphomandra (tree tomato)
- Cyphostemma
- Cypripedium (lady's slipper; an orchid genus)
- Cyrilla
- Cyrtanthus (fire lily)
- Cyrtomium
- Cyrtostachys
- Cystopteris (bladder fern)
- Cytisus (broom)

== D ==
- Daboecia
- Dacrydium
- Dactylis
- Dactylorhiza (marsh orchid)
- Dahlia
- Dalea (indigo bush)
- Dalechampia
- Damasonium
- Dampiera
- Danae
- Daphne
- Daphniphyllum
- Darlingia
- Darmera syn. Peltiphyllum
- Darwinia (lemon scented myrtle)
- Dasylirion
- Datura
- Davallia (hare's foot fern)
- Davidia
- Daviesia
- Decaisnea
- × Degarmoara (a hybrid orchid genus)
- Decarya
- Decumaria
- Deinanthe
- Delairea
- Delonix
- Delosperma
- Delphinium
- Dendranthema
- Dendrobium (an orchid genus)
- Dendrocalamus
- Dendrochilum (an orchid genus)
- Dendromecon (tree poppy)
- Denmoza
- Dennstaedtia (Hayscented fern or Cup fern)
- Deppea
- Derris
- Derwentia
- Deschampsia (hair grass)
- Desfontainia
- Desmodium
- Deuterocohnia syn. Abromeitiella
- Deutzia
- Dianella (flax lily)
- Dianthus (carnation, pink)
- Diascia (twinspur)
- Dicentra (bleeding heart)
- Dichelostemma
- Dichondra
- Dichorisandra
- Dichroa
- Dicksonia
- Dicliptera
- Dictamnus (burning bush, dittany)
- Dictyosperma (princess palm)
- Didymochlaena
- Dieffenbachia (dumb cane, mother-in-law's tongue, tuftroot)
- Dierama (African harebell, angel's fishing rod, wand flower)
- Diervilla (bush honeysuckle)
- Dietes
- Digitalis (foxglove)
- Dillenia
- Dillwynia
- Dimorphotheca (African daisy)
- Dionaea (Venus flytrap)
- Dionysia
- Dioon
- Dioscorea syns. Rajania, Tamus, Testudinaria(yam)
- Diospyros (ebony, persimmon)
- Dipcadi
- Dipelta
- Diphylleia
- Diplarrhena (butterfly flag)
- Diplazium
- Diplocyclos
- Diploglottis
- Diplolaena
- Dipsacus (teasel)
- Dipteris
- Dipteronia
- Dipteryx
- Dirca (leatherwood)
- Disa (an orchid genus)
- Disanthus
- Discaria

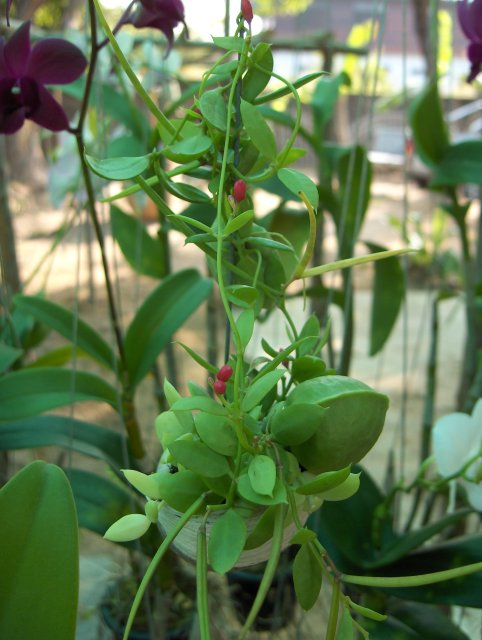
Dischidia pectinoides (ant plant)

- Dischidia
- Discocactus
- Disocactus
- Disporopsis
- Disporum (fairy-bells)
- Dissotis
- Distictis
- Distylium
- Dizygotheca
- Docynia
- Dodecatheon (shooting stars, American cowslip), now Primula sect. Dodecatheon
- Dodonaea (hop bush)
- Dolichandrone
- Dombeya
- Doodia (hacksaw fern, rasp fern)
- Doronicum (leopard's bane)
- Dorotheanthus (ice plant, Livingstone daisy)
- Dorstenia
- Doryanthes (spear lily)
- Doryopteris
- Dovyalis
- Draba (whitlow grass)
- Dracaena
- Dracocephalum
- Dracophyllum
- Dracula (an orchid genus)
- Dracunculus
- Drimys
- Drosanthemum
- Drosera (sundew)
- Dryandra
- Dryas (mountain avens)
- Drynaria
- Dryopteris (buckler fern, shield fern, wood fern)
- Duboisia
- Duchesnea (Indian strawberry, mock strawberry)
- Dudleya
- Duranta
- Duvalia
- Dyckia
- Dymondia
- Dypsis syn. Chrysalidocarpus, Neodypsis

== E ==
- Ebracteola
- Ecballium
- Eccremocarpus
- Echeveria
- Echidnopsis
- Echinacea (coneflower)
- Echinocactus
- Echinocereus
- Echinops (globe thistle)
- Echinopsis
- Echium
- Edgeworthia
- Edithcolea
- Edraianthus
- Egeria
- Ehretia
- Eichhornia (water hyacinth)
- Elaeagnus
- Elaeis (oil palm)
- Elaeocarpus
- Elatostema
- Eleocharis (spike rush)
- Elettaria
- Eleutherococcus
- Elodea (pondweed)
- Elsholtzia
- Elymus (wild rye)
- Embothrium
- Emilia (tasselflower)
- Emmenopterys
- Encelia
- Encephalartos (Kaffir bread)
- Encyclia (an orchid genus)
- Enkianthus
- Ensete
- Eomecon (snow poppy)
- Epacris
- Ephedra (ephedra)
- Epidendrum (an orchid genus)
- Epigaea
- Epilobium
- Epimedium (barrenwort)
- Epipactis (helleborine, an orchid genus)
- Epiphyllum (orchid cactus)
- Episcia (flame violet)
- Epithelantha
- Equisetum (horsetail)
- Eragrostis (love grass)
- Eranthemum
- Eranthis (winter aconite)
- Ercilla
- Eremophila (emu bush)
- Eremurus
- Erica (heath/heather)
- Erigeron (fleabane)
- Erinacea
- Erinus
- Eriobotrya
- Eriogonum
- Eriophorum (cotton grass)
- Eriophyllum
- Eriostemon (waxflower)
- Eritrichium
- Erodium
- Eryngium (eryngo, sea holly)
- Erysimum (wallflower)
- Erythrina (coral tree)
- Erythronium
- Escallonia
- Eschscholzia (California poppy)
- Escobaria
- Espostoa
- Etlingera
- Eucalyptus (gum tree, ironbark)
- Eucharis
- Eucomis
- Eucommia
- Eucryphia
- Eulophia (an orchid genus)
- Euonymus
- Eupatorium
- Euphorbia (spurge)
- Euptelea
- Eurya
- Euryale ferox
- Euryops
- Eustoma
- Evolvulus
- Exacum
- Exochorda

== F ==
- Fabiana
- Fagus (beech)
- Fallopia
- Farfugium
- Fargesia
- Fascicularia
- × Fatshedera (hybrid genus)
- Fatsia
- Faucaria
- Felicia (blue daisy)
- Fendlera
- Fenestraria
- Ferocactus
- Ferraria
- Ferula (giant fennel)
- Festuca (fescue)
- Fibigia
- Ficus (fig)
- Ficus pumila
- Filipendula
- Firmiana
- Fittonia
- Fitzroya
- Fockea
- Foeniculum (fennel)
- Fontanesia
- Forsythia
- Fortunella (kumquat)
- Fothergilla
- Fouquieria
- Fragaria (strawberry)
- Frailea
- Francoa
- Frangipani
- Franklinia
- Fraxinus (ash)
- Freesia
- Fremontodendron
- Fritillaria (fritillary)
- Fuchsia
- Furcraea

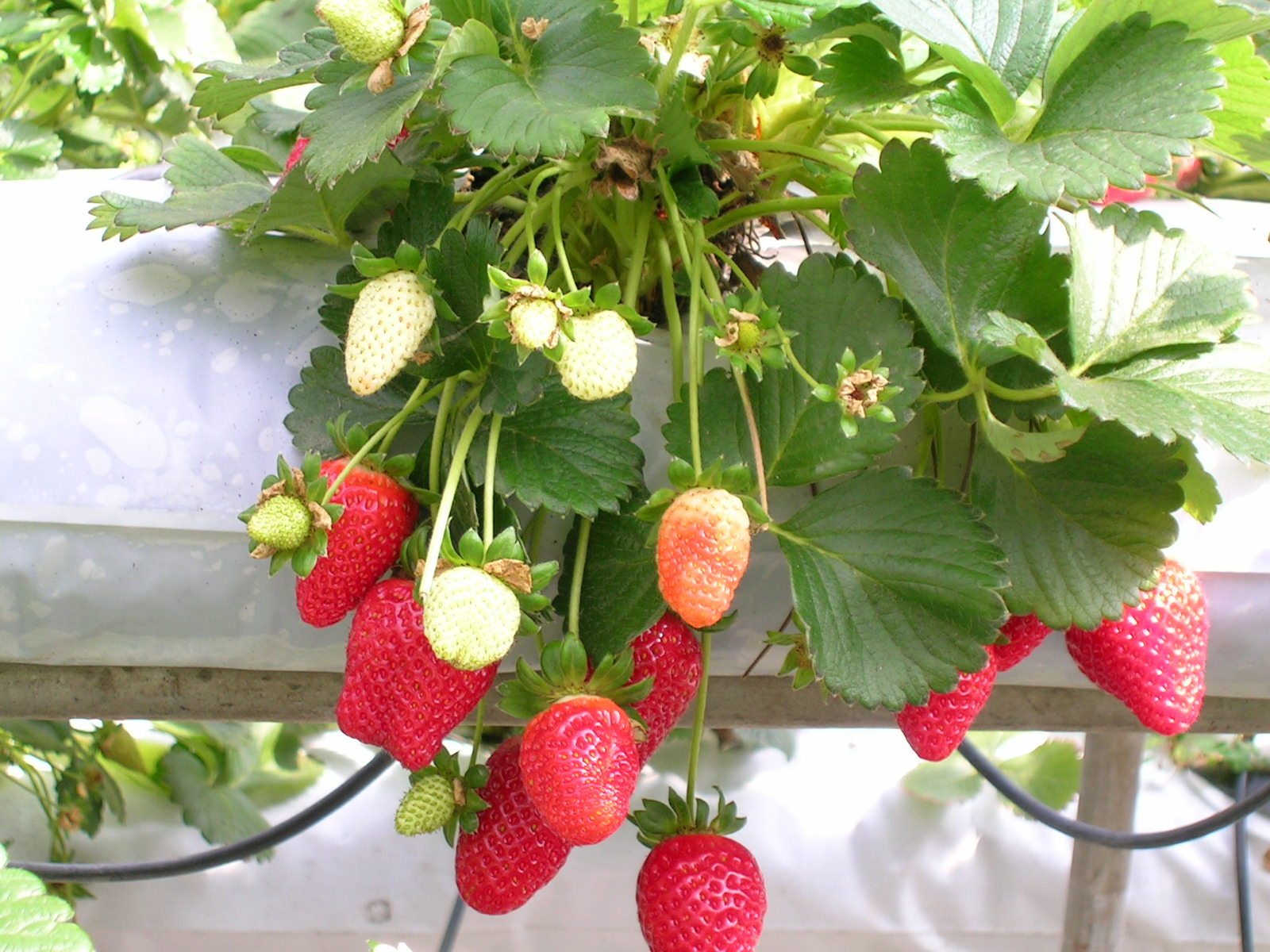
Fragaria x ananassa.

== G ==
- Gagea
- Gaillardia
- Galanthus (snowdrop)
- Galax
- Galega
- Galium (bedstraw)
- Galtonia
- Gardenia
- Garrya
- Gasteria
- Gaultheria
- Gaura
- Gaylussacia (huckleberry)
- Gazania
- Geissorhiza
- Gelsemium
- Genista
- Gentiana (gentian)
- Gentianopsis
- Geranium (cranesbill, not same as Pelargonium)
- Gerbera
- Gesneria
- Geum (avens)
- Gevuina
- Gibbaeum
- Gilia
- Gillenia
- Ginkgo
- Gladiolus
- Glaucidium
- Glaucium
- Gleditsia (honey locust)
- Globba
- Globularia (globe daisy)
- Gloriosa
- Glottiphyllum
- Gloxinia
- Glyceria
- Glycyrrhiza
- Gomphocarpus
- Gomphrena
- Goniolimon
- Goodyera (jewel orchid)
- Gordonia
- Graptopetalum
- Graptophyllum
- Graptoveria (hybrid genus)
- Grevillea
- Grewia
- Greyia
- Grindelia
- Griselinia
- Gunnera (dinosaur food)
- Guzmania
- Gymnocalycium
- Gymnocarpium
- Gymnocladus
- Gynandriris
- Gynura
- Gypsophila

== H ==
- Haageocereus
- Haastia
- Habenaria (an orchid genus)
- Haberlea
- Habranthus
- Haemanthus (blood lily)
- Hakea
- Hakonechloa
- Halesia (silverbell)
- Halimiocistus (hybrid genus)
- Halimium
- Halimodendron
- Hamamelis (witch-hazel)
- Haplopappus
- Hardenbergia (coral pea)
- Harrisia
- Hatiora
- Haworthia
- Hebe
- Hechtia
- Hedera (ivy)
- Hedychium
- Hedyotis (bluets)
- Hedysarum
- Hedyscepe (umbrella palm)
- Helenium (sneezeweed)
- Helianthemum (rock rose)
- Helianthus (sunflower)
- Helichrysum
- Heliconia
- Helictotrichon
- Heliocereus
- Heliophila
- Heliopsis (ox eye)
- Heliotropium (heliotrope)
- Helleborus (hellebore)
- Heloniopsis
- Hemerocallis (daylily)
- Hemigraphis
- Hepatica
- Heptacodium
- Heracleum
- Herbertia
- Hereroa
- Hermannia
- Hermodactylus
- Hesperaloe
- Hesperantha
- Hesperis
- Hesperocallis
- Heterocentron
- Heterotheca
- Heuchera (coral flower)
- × Heucherella (hybrid genus)
- Hibbertia
- Hibiscus (rose of Sharon)
- Hieracium (hawkweed)
- Himalayacalamus
- Hippeastrum (amaryllis)
- Hippocrepis
- Hippophae
- Hohenbergia
- Hohenbergiopsis
- Hoheria
- Holboellia
- Holcus
- Holmskioldia
- Holodiscus
- Homalocladium (ribbon bush)
- Homeria
- Hoodia
- Hordeum (barley)
- Horminum
- Hosta (plantain lily)
- Hottonia
- Houttuynia
- Hovea
- Hovenia
- Howea (sentry palm)
- Hoya (wax flower)
- Huernia
- Humulus (hops)
- Hunnemannia
- Huntleya an orchid genus
- Hyacinthella
- Hyacinthoides
- Hyacinthus (hyacinth)
- Hydrangea
- Hydrastis (goldenseal)
- Hydrocharis (frogbit)
- Hydrocleys
- Hydrocotyle (pennywort)
- Hygrophila
- Hylocereus
- Hylomecon
- Hymenocallis
- Hymenosporum
- Hyophorbe (bottle palm)
- Hyoscyamus (henbane)
- Hypericum (St. John's wort, rose of Sharon)
- Hyphaene (doum palm)
- Hypocalymma
- Hypoestes
- Hypoxis (starflower)
- Hypsela
- Hyssopus (hyssop)

=== I ===
- Iberis (candytuft)
- Ibervillea
- Idesia
- Ilex (holly)
- Illicium
- Impatiens (balsam)
- Imperata
- Incarvillea
- Indigofera
- Inula
- Iochroma
- Ipheion
- Ipomoea (morning glory)
- Ipomopsis
- Iresine
- Iris
- Isatis
- Isoplexis
- Isopyrum
- Itea
- Ixia (corn lily)
- Ixiolirion
- Ixora

== J ==
- Jaborosa
- Jacaranda
- Jacquemontia
- Jamesia
- Jasione
- Jasminum (jasmine, jessamine)
- Jatropha
- Jeffersonia
- Jovellana
- Jovibarba
- Juanulloa
- Jubaea (Chilean wine palm)
- Juglans (walnut)
- Juncus (rush)
- Juniperus (juniper)
- Justicia

== K ==
- Kadsura
- Kaempferia
- Kalanchoe
- Kalimeris
- Kalmia (mountain laurel)
- Kalmiopsis
- Kalopanax
- Kelseya
- Kerria
- Kigelia (sausage tree)
- Kirengeshoma
- Kitaibela
- Kleinia
- Knautia
- Knightia
- Kniphofia
- Koeleria (junegrass)
- Koelreuteria (golden rain tree)
- Kohleria
- Kolkwitzia (beautybush)
- Kosteletzkya
- Kunzea

== L ==
- Lablab
- Laburnocytisus
- Laburnum (laburnum)
- Laccospadix
- Lachenalia (Cape cowslip)
- Laelia (an orchid genus)
- × Laeliocattleya (hybrid orchid genus)
- Lagarosiphon
- Lagenophora
- Lagerstroemia
- Lagunaria
- Lagurus
- Lamarckia
- Lambertia
- Lamium (deadnettle)
- Lampranthus
- Lantana (shrub verbena)
- Lapageria
- Lardizabala
- Larix (larch)
- Larrea (creosote bush)
- Latania (Latan palm)
- Lathraea
- Lathyrus
- Laurelia
- Laurus
- Lavandula (lavender)
- Lavatera (mallow)
- Lawsonia
- Layia
- Ledebouria
- Ledodendron (hybrid genus)
- Ledum
- Leea
- Legousia
- Leiophyllum
- Leipoldtia
- Leitneria
- Lemboglossum
- Lenophyllum
- Leonotis
- Leontice
- Leontopodium (edelweiss)
- Lepidozamia
- Leptinella
- Lechenaultia
- Lespedeza (bush clover)
- Leucadendron
- Leucanthemella
- Leucanthemopsis
- Leucanthemum
- Leuchtenbergia
- Leucocoryne
- Leucogenes
- Leucojum (snowflake)
- Leucophyllum
- Leucophyta
- Leucopogon
- Leucoraoulia (hybrid genus)
- Leucospermum (pincushion)
- Leucothoe
- Lewisia
- Leycesteria
- Leymus
- Liatris
- Libertia
- Libocedrus
- Ligularia
- Ligustrum (privet)
- Lilium (lily)
- Limnanthes
- Limnocharis
- Limonium (sea lavender)
- Linanthus
- Linaria (toadflax)
- Lindelofia
- Lindera
- Lindheimera (star daisy)
- Linnaea (twinflower)
- Linospadix
- Linum (flax)
- Liquidambar (sweetgum)
- Liriodendron (tulip tree)
- Liriope (lilyturf)
- Lithocarpus
- Lithodora
- Lithophragma
- Lithops
- Littonia
- Livistona
- Loasa
- Lobelia
- Lobularia (sweet alyssum)
- Lodoicea (coco de mer)
- Loiseleuria
- Lomandra (mat rush)
- Lomatia
- Lomatium
- Lomatophyllum
- Lonicera (honeysuckle)
- Lopezia
- Lophomyrtus
- Lophospermum
- Lophostemon
- Loropetalum
- Lotus
- Luculia
- Ludwigia
- Luma
- Lunaria
- Lupinus (lupin)
- Luzula (woodrush)
- Lycaste (an orchid genus)
- Lychnis (campion)
- Lycium
- Lycopodium (club moss)
- Lycoris
- Lygodium (climbing fern)
- Lyonia
- Lyonothamnus
- Lysichiton (yellow skunk cabbage)
- Lysiloma
- Lysimachia
- Lythrum (loosestrife)

== M ==
- Maackia
- Macfadyena
- Machaeranthera
- Mackaya
- Macleania
- Macleaya
- Maclura
- Macropidia
- Macrozamia
- Magnolia
- Mahonia
- Maianthemum (May lily)
- Maihuenia
- Malcolmia
- Malephora
- Malope
- Malpighia
- Malus (apple, crabapple)
- Malva (mallow)
- Malvastrum
- Malvaviscus
- Mammillaria
- Mandevilla
- Mandragora (mandrake)
- Manettia
- Manglietia
- Maranta
- Margyricarpus
- Marrubium (horehound)
- Marsilea (pepperwort)
- Masdevallia (an orchid genus)
- Matteuccia
- Matthiola (stock)
- Maurandella
- Maurandya
- Maxillaria (an orchid genus)
- Maytenus
- Mazus
- Meconopsis
- Medicago (alfalfa)
- Medinilla
- Meehania
- Megacodon
- Megaskepasma
- Melaleuca (paperbark)
- Melasphaerula
- Melastoma
- Melia
- Melianthus
- Melica (melic)
- Melicytus
- Melinis
- Meliosma
- Melissa (balm)
- Melittis (bastard balm)
- Melocactus
- Menispermum (moonseed)
- Mentha (mint)
- Mentzelia (starflower)
- Menyanthes
- Menziesia
- Merendera
- Merremia
- Mertensia
- Mespilus
- Metasequoia (dawn redwood)
- Metrosideros
- Meum
- Mexicoa
- Michauxia
- Michelia
- Microbiota
- Microcachrys
- Microlepia
- Micromeria
- Mikania
- Milium
- Milla
- Millettia
- Miltonia (an orchid genus)
- Miltoniopsis (pansy orchid)
- Mimetes
- Mimosa (mimosa, or sensitive plant)
- Mimulus (monkey flower)
- Mirabilis
- Miscanthus
- Mitchella (partridge berry)
- Mitella
- Mitraria
- Molinia
- Moltkia
- Moluccella
- Monadenium
- Monanthes
- Monarda (bee balm)
- Monardella
- Monstera
- Moraea
- Morina
- Morisia
- Morus (mulberry)
- Mucuna
- Muehlenbeckia
- Mukdenia
- Musa (banana, plantain)
- Muscari (grape hyacinth)
- Mussaenda
- Mutisia
- Myoporum
- Myosotidium
- Myosotis (forget-me-not)
- Myrica
- Myriophyllum (milfoil)
- Myrrhis (sweet cicely)
- Myrsine
- Myrteola
- Myrtillocactus
- Myrtus (myrtle)

== N ==
- Nandina (heavenly bamboo)
- Narcissus (daffodil)
- Nasturtium (watercress)
- Nautilocalyx
- Nectaroscordum
- Neillia
- Nelumbo (lotus)
- Nematanthus
- Nemesia
- Nemopanthus (mountain holly)
- Nemophila
- Neobuxbaumia
- Neolitsea
- Neolloydia
- Neomarica
- Neoporteria
- Neoregelia
- Nepenthes (pitcher plant)
- Nepeta (catmint)
- Nephrolepis
- Nerine
- Nerium (oleander)
- Nertera
- Nicandra
- Nicotiana (tobacco)
- Nidularium
- Nierembergia
- Nigella
- Nipponanthemum
- Nolana
- Nomocharis
- Nopalxochia
- Nothofagus (southern beech)
- Notholirion
- Nothoscordum (false garlic)
- Notospartium
- Nuphar (spatterdock)
- Nymania
- Nymphaea (waterlily)
- Nymphoides (floating heart)
- Nyssa (tupelo)

== O ==
- Obregonia
- Ochagavia
- Ochna
- Ocimum
- × Odontioda (hybrid orchid genus)
- × Odontocidium (hybrid orchid genus)
- Odontoglossum (an orchid genus)
- Odontonema
- × Odontonia (hybrid orchid genus)
- Oemleria
- Oenanthe (water dropwort)
- Oenothera (evening primrose, sundrops)
- Olea (olive)
- Olearia (daisy bush)
- Olneya
- Olsynium
- Omphalodes (navelwort)
- Omphalogramma
- Oncidium (an orchid genus)
- Onoclea
- Ononis (restharrow)
- Onopordum
- Onosma
- Oophytum
- Ophiopogon (lilyturf)
- Ophrys (an orchid genus)
- Oplismenus
- Opuntia (prickly pears, chollas and many other cactus species)
- Orbea
- Orbeopsis
- Orchis (an orchid genus)
- Oreocereus
- Origanum (marjoram, oregano)
- Orixa
- Ornithogalum
- Orontium (golden club)
- Orostachys
- Oroya
- Ortegocactus
- Orthophytum
- Orthrosanthus
- Orychophragmus
- Oryza (rice)
- Osbeckia
- Osmanthus
- Osmunda (royal fern)
- Osteomeles
- Osteospermum
- Ostrowskia (giant bellflower)
- Ostrya
- Othonna
- Ourisia
- Oxalis (shamrock, sorrel)
- Oxydendrum
- Oxypetalum
- Ozothamnus

== P ==
- Pachistima
- Pachycereus
- Pachycormus
- Pachycymbium
- Pachyphragma
- Pachyphytum
- Pachypodium
- Pachysandra
- Pachystachys
- Pachystegia
- Pachystima
- Pachyveria (hybrid genus)
- Paeonia (peony)
- Paliurus
- Pamianthe
- Panax (ginseng)
- Pancratium (sea lily)
- Pandanus (screw pine)
- Pandorea
- Panicum
- Pansy
- Papaver (poppy)
- Paphiopedilum (slipper orchid)
- Paradisea (paradise lily)
- Parahebe
- Paraquilegia
- Parkinsonia
- Parnassia
- Parochetus
- Parodia
- Paronychia
- Parrotia
- Parrotiopsis
- Parthenocissus
- Passiflora (granadilla, passionflower)
- Patersonia
- Patrinia
- Paulownia
- Paurotis
- Pavonia
- Pedilanthus
- Pediocactus
- Pelargonium (geranium)
- Pellaea
- Peltandra (arrow arum)
- Peltoboykinia
- Peltophorum
- Peniocereus
- Pennisetum
- Penstemon
- Pentachondra
- Pentaglottis
- Pentas
- Peperomia
- Peraphyllum
- Pereskia
- Perezia
- Pericallis
- Perilla
- Periploca
- Perovskia (now included in Salvia)
- Pernettya (now included in Gaultheria)
- Persea
- Persicaria (fleeceflower, knotweed)
- Petasites (butterbur, sweet coltsfoot)
- Petrea
- Petrocosmea
- Petrophile
- Petrophytum
- Petrorhagia
- Petroselinum (parsley)
- Petteria
- Petunia
- Phacelia
- Phaedranassa (queen lily)
- Phaius (an orchid genus)
- Phalaenopsis (moth orchid)
- Phalaris
- Phebalium
- Phegopteris (beech fern)
- Phellodendron (cork tree)
- Philadelphus (mock orange)
- Philageria (hybrid genus)
- Philesia
- Phillyrea
- Philodendron
- Phlebodium
- Phlomis
- Phlox
- Phoenix (date palm)
- Phormium
- Photinia
- Phragmipedium (an orchid genus)
- Phragmites (reed)
- Phuopsis
- Phygelius
- Phylica (Cape myrtle)
- × Phylliopsis (hybrid genus)
- Phyllocladus (toatoa)
- Phyllodoce
- Phyllostachys
- Phyllothamnus (hybrid genus)
- Physalis (ground cherry)
- Physaria (bladderpod)
- Physocarpus
- Physoplexis
- Physostegia
- Phyteuma
- Phytolacca (pokeweed)
- Picea (spruce)
- Picrasma
- Pieris
- Pilea
- Pileostegia
- Pilosella
- Pilosocereus
- Pimelea
- Pimpinella
- Pinanga
- Pinckneya
- Pinellia
- Pinguicula (butterwort)
- Pinus (pine)
- Piper (pepper)
- Piptanthus
- Pisonia
- Pistacia (pistachio)
- Pistia
- Pitcairnia
- Pithecellobium
- Pittosporum
- Pityrogramma
- Plantago (plantain)
- Platanus (plane tree, sycamore)
- Platycarya
- Platycerium (staghorn fern)
- Platycladus (Chinese arborvitae)
- Platycodon (balloon flower)
- Platystemon (creamcups)
- Plectranthus an orchid genus
- Pleioblastus
- Pleione (an orchid genus)
- Pleiospilos (living granite)
- Pleurothallis (an orchid genus)
- Plumeria (frangipani)
- Poa
- Podalyria
- Podocarpus
- Podophyllum (mayapple)
- Podranea
- Polemonium (jacob's ladder, abscess root)
- Polianthes
- Poliothyrsis
- Polygala (milkwort, seneca, snakeroot)
- Polygonatum
- Polygonum (knotweed, knotgrass)
- Polypodium
- Polyscias
- Polystichum
- Poncirus
- Pongamia
- Pontederia (pickerel weed)
- Populus (aspen, poplar, cottonwood)
- Porana
- Portea
- Portulaca (purslane, moss rose)
- Portulacaria
- Posoqueria
- Potamogeton
- Potentilla (cinquefoil)
- Pothos
- × Potinara (hybrid orchid genus)
- Pratia
- Primula (primrose)
- Prinsepia
- Pritchardia
- Proboscidea (unicorn plant)
- Promenaea an orchid genus
- Prosopis (mesquite)
- Prostanthera (mint bush)
- Protea
- Prumnopitys
- Prunella (self-heal)
- Prunus (almond, apricot, cherry, peach, plum)
- Pseuderanthemum
- Pseudocydonia
- Pseudolarix (golden-larch)
- Pseudopanax
- Pseudosasa
- Pseudotsuga (douglas-fir)
- Pseudowintera
- Psilotum
- Psychopsis (butterfly orchid)
- Psylliostachys (statice)
- Ptelea
- Pteris (brake, table fern)
- Pterocactus
- Pterocarya (wingnut)
- Pteroceltis
- Pterocephalus
- Pterodiscus
- Pterostyrax
- Ptilotus
- Ptychosperma
- Pueraria
- Pulmonaria (lungwort)
- Pulsatilla
- Pultenaea
- Punica (pomegranate)
- Purshia
- Puschkinia
- Putoria
- Puya
- Pycnanthemum
- Pycnostachys
- Pyracantha (firethorn)
- Pyrola (wintergreen)
- Pyrostegia
- Pyrrosia
- Pyrus (pear)

== Q ==
- Quamoclit
- Quaqua
- Quercus (oak)
- Quesnelia
- Quisqualis
- Quince

== R ==
- Ramonda
- Ranunculus (buttercup, crowfoot)
- Ranzania
- Raoulia
- Raphia (raffia)
- Ratibida
- Ravenala (traveler's tree)
- Rebutia
- Rehderodendron
- Rehmannia
- Reineckea
- Reinwardtia
- Reseda (Mignonette)
- Retama
- Rhamnus
- Rhaphidophora
- Rhaphiolepis
- Rhapidophyllum (needle palm)
- Rhapis (lady palm)
- Rheum (rhubarb)
- Rhexia
- Rhipsalis
- Rhodanthe (strawflower)
- Rhodanthemum
- Rhodiola
- Rhodochiton
- Rhododendron
- Rhodohypoxis
- Rhodophiala
- Rhodothamnus
- Rhodotypos
- Rhoeo
- Rhoicissus
- Rhombophyllum
- Rhus (sumac)
- Rhynchelytrum
- Rhynchostylis (an orchid genus)
- Ribes (currant)
- Richea
- Ricinus (castor-oil plant)
- Rigidella
- Robinia
- Rodgersia
- Rodriguezia an orchid genus
- Rohdea
- Romanzoffia
- Romneya (Matilija poppy, tree poppy)
- Romulea
- Rondeletia
- Rosa (rose)
- Roscoea
- Rosmarinus (rosemary)
- Rossioglossum an orchid genus
- Rothmannia
- Roystonea (royal palm)
- Rubus (raspberry)
- Rudbeckia (coneflower)
- Ruellia
- Rumex (dock)
- Rumohra
- Rupicapnos
- Ruschia
- Ruscus
- Russelia
- Ruta (rue)

== S ==
- Sabal (palmetto)
- Saccharum (plume grass, sugar cane)
- Sadleria
- Sagina (pearlwort)
- Sagittaria (arrowhead)
- Salix (willow)
- Salpiglossis
- Salvia (sage)
- Salvinia
- Sambucus (elder)
- Sanchezia
- Sandersonia
- Sanguinaria (bloodroot)
- Sanguisorba (burnet)
- Sanicula
- Sansevieria
- Santolina
- Sanvitalia (creeping zinnia)
- Sapindus
- Sapium (tallow tree)
- Saponaria (soapwort)
- Sarcocapnos
- Sarcocaulon
- Sarcococca
- Saritaea, see Bignonia magnifica
- Sarmienta
- Sarracenia (pitcher plant)
- Sasa
- Sassafras
- Satureja (savory)
- Sauromatum
- Saxegothaea
- Saxifraga (saxifrage)
- Scabiosa (scabious plant)
- Scadoxus (blood lily)
- Scaevola
- Schefflera
- Schima
- Schinus
- Schisandra
- Schizachyrium
- Schizanthus
- Schizopetalon
- Schizophragma
- Schizostylis
- Schlumbergera
- Schoenoplectus
- Schomburgkia an orchid genus
- Schotia
- Schwantesia
- Sciadopitys
- Scilla (including the former genus Chionodoxa)
- Scindapsus
- Scirpoides
- Sclerocactus
- Scoliopus
- Scopolia
- Scrophularia (figwort)
- Scutellaria
- Securinega
- Sedum (stonecrop)
- Selaginella
- Selago
- Selenicereus
- Selinum
- Semele
- Semiaquilegia
- Semiarundinaria
- Sempervivum (hens and chicks)
- Senecio (ragwort)
- Senna
- Sequoia (coast redwood)
- Sequoiadendron (giant sequoia)
- Seriphidium
- Serissa
- Serruria
- Sesbania
- Sesleria
- Setaria
- Shepherdia
- Shibataea
- Shortia
- Sibiraea
- Sidalcea
- Sideritis
- Silene (campion)
- Silphium
- Silybum
- Simmondsia (jojoba)
- Sinningia
- Sinofranchetia
- Sinojackia
- Sinowilsonia
- Sisyrinchium
- Skimmia
- Smilacina
- Smilax
- Smithiantha
- Smyrnium
- Sobralia an orchid genus
- Solandra
- Solanum (potato, nightshade)
- Soldanella (snowbell)
- Soleirolia
- Solenopsis
- Solenostemon
- Solidago (goldenrod)
- Solidaster (supposedly hybrid genus; see Solidago)
- Sollya
- Sonerila
- Sophora
- × Sophrolaeliocattleya (trigeneric hybrid orchid)
- Sophronitis (an orchid genus)
- Sorbaria
- Sorbus (rowan, whitebeam)
- Sorghastrum
- Sparaxis
- Sparganium (bur-reed)
- Sparrmannia
- Spartina (cord grass)
- Spartium (broom)
- Spathiphyllum
- Spathodea
- Sphaeralcea
- Spigelia
- Spiraea (spirea)
- Sprianthes (an orchid genus)
- Sporobolus
- Sprekelia
- Stachys (betony)
- Stachyurus
- Stangeria
- Stanhopea (an orchid genus)
- Stapelia
- Stapelianthus
- Staphylea (bladdernut)
- Stauntonia
- Stenanthium
- Stenocactus
- Stenocarpus
- Stenocereus
- Stenomesson
- Stenotaphrum
- Stenotus
- Stephanandra
- Stephanocereus
- Stephanotis
- Sternbergia
- Stigmaphyllon
- Stipa
- Stokesia
- Stomatium
- Stratiotes
- Strelitzia (bird of paradise)
- Streptocarpus (Cape primrose)
- Streptosolen
- Strobilanthes
- Stromanthe
- Strombocactus
- Strongylodon
- Stuartia
- Stylidium
- Stylophorum
- Styphelia
- Styrax
- Succisa
- Sulcorebutia
- Sutera
- Sutherlandia
- Swainsona
- Swainsonia
- Syagrus
- Sycoparrotia (hybrid genus)
- Sycopsis
- Symphoricarpos (snowberry)
- Symphyandra
- Symphytum (comfrey)
- Symplocos
- Synadenium
- Syneilesis
- Syngonium
- Synthyris
- Syringa (lilac)
- Syzygium (rose apple)

== T ==
- Tabebuia
- Tabernaemontana
- Tacca
- Tagetes (Mexican or French marigold)
- Talinum (fameflower)
- Tamarix (tamarisk)
- Tanacetum (tansy)
- Tanakaea
- Tapeinochilos
- Taxodium (bald cypress)
- Taxus (yew)
- Tecoma
- Tecomanthe
- Tecomaria
- Tecophilaea
- Telekia
- Telephium
- Tellima
- Telopea (waratah)
- Templetonia
- Terminalia
- Ternstroemia
- Tetracentron
- Tetradium (bee tree)
- Tetranema
- Tetraneuris
- Tetrapanax
- Tetrastigma
- Tetratheca
- Teucrium
- Thalia
- Thalictrum
- Thelesperma
- Thelocactus
- Thelypteris
- Thermopsis
- Thespesia
- Thevetia
- Thlaspi
- Thrinax (thatch palm)
- Thryptomene (heath myrtle)
- Thuja (thuja, arborvitae)
- Thujopsis (hiba)
- Thunbergia
- Thymophylla
- Thymus (thyme)
- Tiarella
- Tibouchina
- Tigridia
- Tilia (linden)
- Tillandsia (air plant, Spanish moss)
- Tipuana
- Titanopsis
- Tithonia (Mexican sunflower)
- Todea
- Tolmiea
- Tolpis
- Toona
- Torenia
- Torreya (nutmeg yew)
- Tovara
- Townsendia
- Trachelium
  - Trachelium caeruleum (blue throatwort)
- Trachelospermum
- Trachycarpus (chusan palm)
- Trachymene
- Tradescantia (spiderwort)
- Trapa (water caltrop)
- Trichodiadema
- Trichosanthes
- Tricyrtis (toad lily)
- Trientalis
- Trifolium (clover)
- Trillium
- Tripetaleia
- Tripterygium
- Triteleia (triplet lily)
- Tritonia
- Trochodendron
- Trollius (globeflower)
- Tropaeolum (nasturtium)
- Tsuga (hemlock)
- Tsusiophyllum
- Tuberaria
- Tulbaghia
- Tulipa (tulip)
- Tweedia
- Tylecodon
- Typha (cattail)

== U ==
- Uebelmannia
- Ugni
- Ulex (gorse)
- Ulmus (elm)
- Umbellularia
- Uncinia
- Uniola
- Urceolina
- Urginea
- Ursinia
- Utricularia (bladderwort)
- Uvularia (merrybells, bellwort)

== V ==
- Valeriana (garden valerian)
- Vallea
- Vancouveria
- Vanda (an orchid genus)
- Vanilla an orchid genus
- Veitchia
- Vellozia
- Veltheimia
- Veratrum
- Verbascum (mullein)
- Verbena
- Vernonia (ironweed)
- Veronica (speedwell)
- Veronicastrum
- Verticordia
- Vestia
- Viburnum
- Victoria (giant waterlily)
- Vigna (cowpea and various beans)
- Viguiera
- Vinca (periwinkle)
- Viola (pansy, violet)
- Virgilia
- Viscaria
- Vitaliana
- Vitex
- Vitis (grape)
- Vriesea

== W ==
- Wachendorfia
- Wahlenbergia
- Waldsteinia
- Washingtonia
- Watsonia
- Weberocereus
- Wedelia
- Weigela
- Weingartia
- Weldenia
- Welwitschia
- Westringia
- Widdringtonia
- Wigandia
- Wigginsia
- Wikstroemia
- Wilsonaria (hybrid orchid genus)
- Wisteria
- Wittrockia
- Wolffia
- Woodsia
- Woodwardia (chain fern)
- Worsleya
- Wulfenia

== X ==
- Xanthoceras
- Xanthorhiza
- Xanthosoma
- Xeranthemum
- Xerophyllum
- Xylosma

== Y ==
- Yucca
- Yushania

== Z ==
- Zaluzianskya
- Zamia
- Zamioculcas
- Zantedeschia (calla lily)
- Zanthoxylum
- Zauschneria
- Zea (maize)
- Zelkova
- Zenobia
- Zephyranthes
- Zigadenus
- Zinnia
- Zizania (wild rice)
- Zygopetalum (an orchid genus)

== See also ==
- List of culinary fruits
- List of foods – Categorically organized list of food items
- List of leaf vegetables
- List of vegetables
- Lists of plants
