= Tallow (disambiguation) =

Tallow may refer to:

- Tallow, rendered bovine fat, derived from Suet
- Tallow tree
  - Chinese tallow, Chinese tallow tree (Sapium sebiferum); its flowers are a major source of nectar for bees to collect to make honey
- Tallow wood, name of several plants
- Tallow, County Waterford, Ireland, a town

== See also ==
- Worshipful Company of Tallow Chandlers, London-based livery company
