= M. sylvestris =

M. sylvestris may refer to:

- Malus sylvestris, a crabapple species native to Europe
- Malva sylvestris, a mallow species
- Miacis sylvestris, a primitive carnivoran

== Synonyms ==
- Melittis sylvestris, a synonym for Melittis melissophyllum, the bastard balm, a plant species
- Mentha sylvestris, a synonym for Mentha longifolia, a plant species native to Europe
