= Heeria =

Heeria may refer to:

- Heeria (plant), a genus of plants in the family Anacardiaceae
- Heeria (bug), an extinct genus of true bugs in the family Coreidae
- Heeria, a genus of plants in the family Melastomataceae, synonym of Heterocentron
