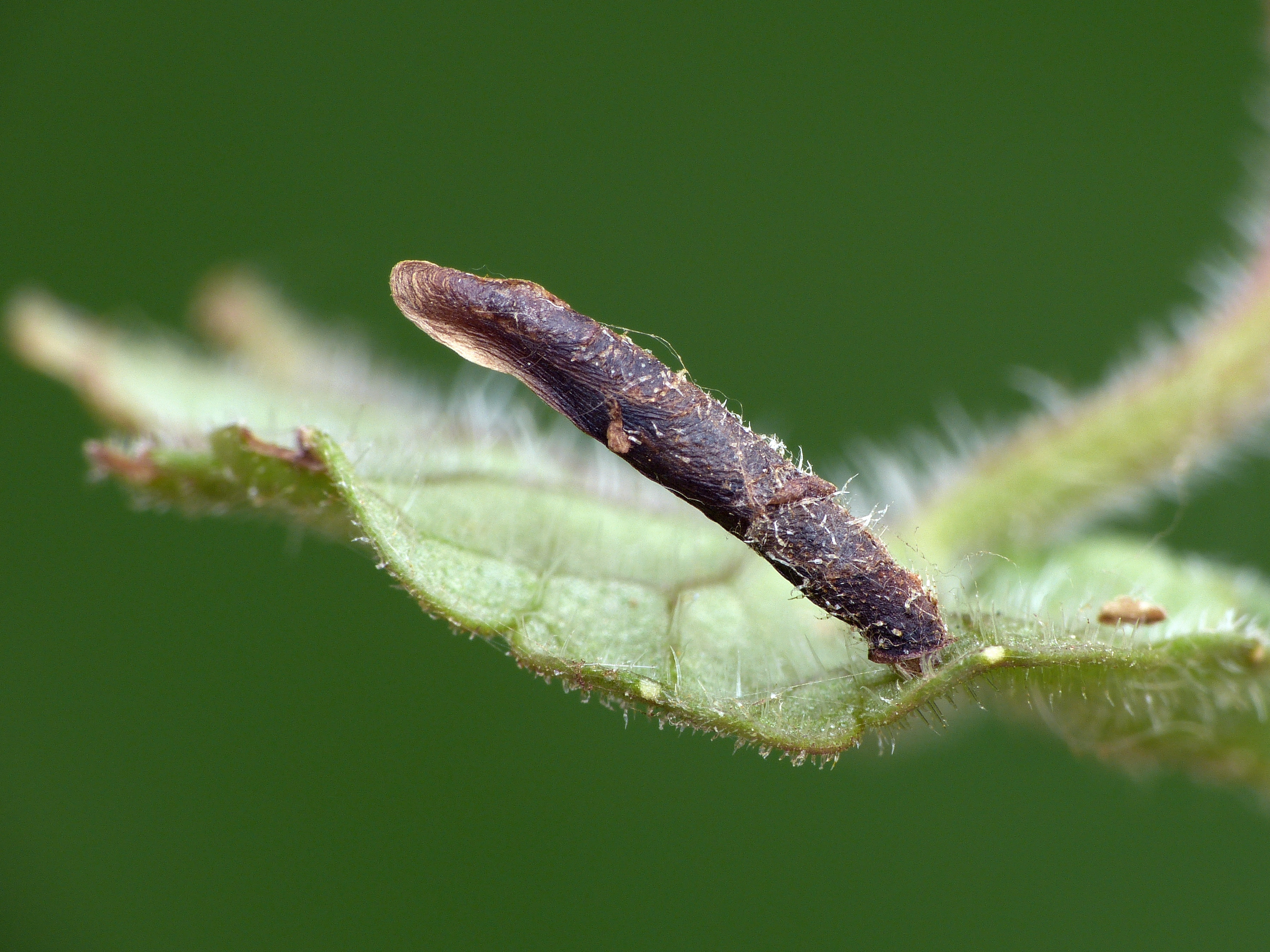

Scientific classification
- Kingdom: Animalia
- Phylum: Arthropoda
- Class: Insecta
- Order: Lepidoptera
- Family: Coleophoridae
- Genus: Coleophora
- Species: C. albitarsella

Binomial name
- Coleophora albitarsella Zeller, 1849

= Coleophora albitarsella =

Species of moth

Coleophora albitarsella is a moth of the family Coleophoridae. It is found in most of Europe, but has not been recorded from Ireland and Greece.

== Description ==
The wingspan is 10–13 mm (0.39–0.51 in). Adults are on wing from mid-June to August in western Europe.

The larvae feed on Clinopodium vulgare, Glechoma hederacea, Lycopus europaeus, Melissa officinalis, Melittis melissophyllum, Mentha aquatica, Mentha arvensis, Nepeta cataria, Origanum vulgare, Prunella vulgaris, Salvia pratensis, Salvia verbenaca, Satureja, Stachys and Thymus species. Full-grown larvae can be found in May.
