= Testudinaria elegans =

Scientific classification
- Kingdom: Animalia
- Phylum: Arthropoda
- Subphylum: Chelicerata
- Class: Arachnida
- Order: Araneae
- Infraorder: Araneomorphae
- Family: Araneidae
- Genus: Testudinaria
- Species: T. elegans

Binomial name
- Testudinaria elegans Taczanowski, 1879

Species of spider

Testudinaria elegans is a species of spiders in the family Araneidae. It is found from Panama to Peru.
