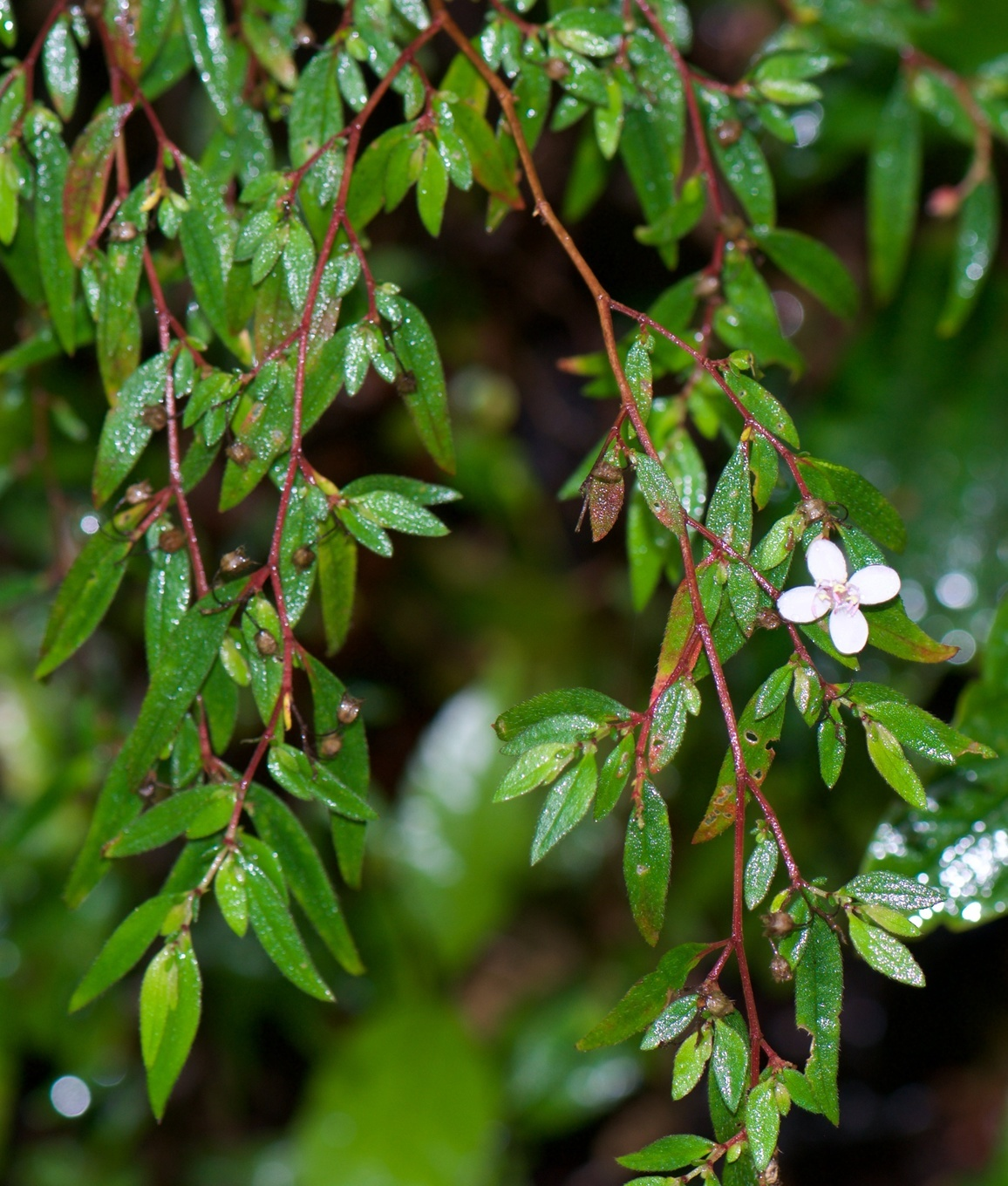
- Foliage and flower
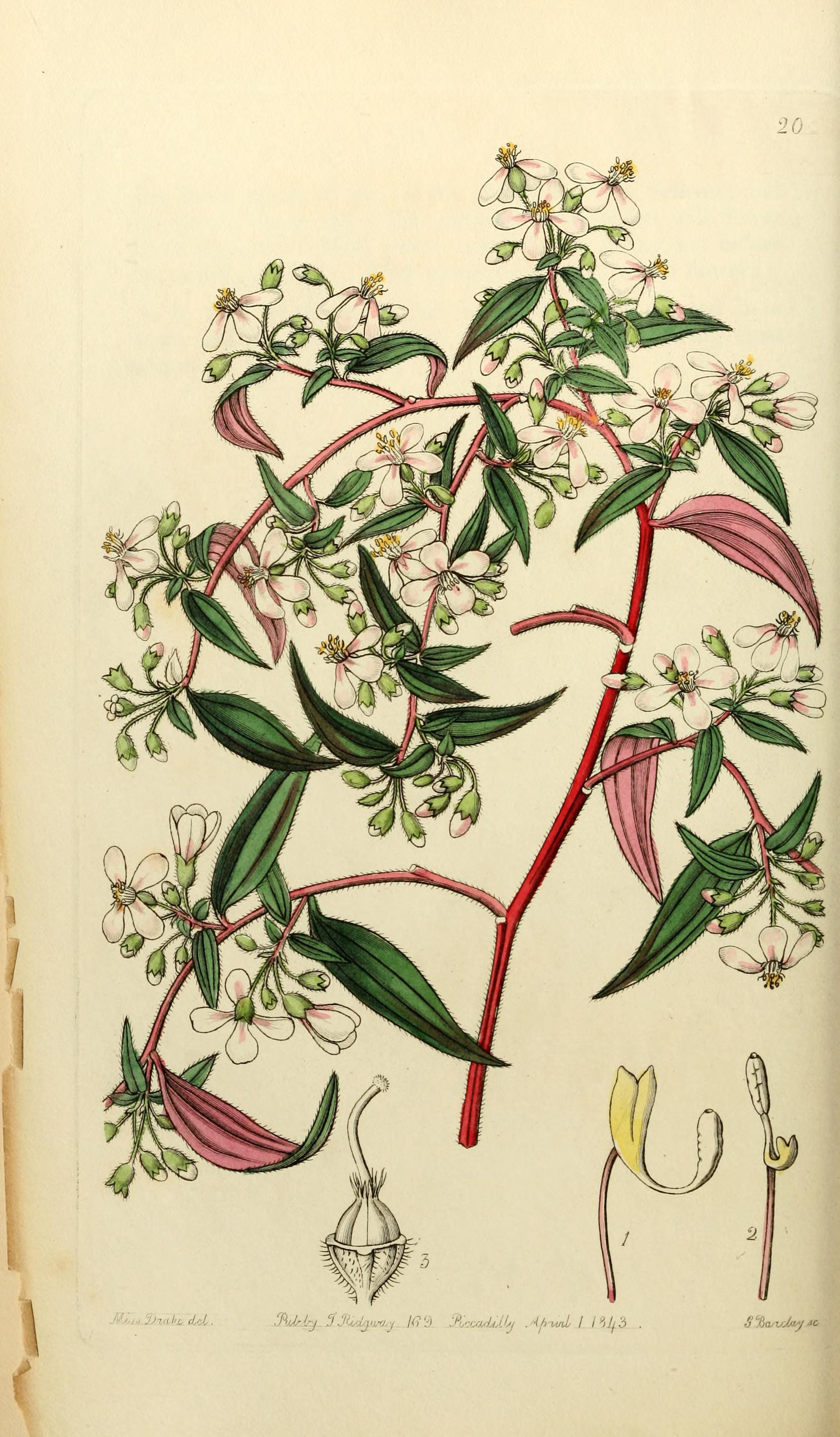
- Botanical illustration

Scientific classification
- Kingdom: Plantae
- Clade: Embryophytes
- Clade: Tracheophytes
- Clade: Angiosperms
- Clade: Eudicots
- Clade: Rosids
- Order: Myrtales
- Family: Melastomataceae
- Genus: Centradenia
- Species: C. inaequilateralis

Binomial name
- Centradenia inaequilateralis G.Don

Synonyms
- List: Centradenia divaricata Klotzsch; Centradenia inaequilateralis var. major Cogn.; Centradenia oerstediana Klotzsch; Centradenia rosea Lindl.; Donkelaaria diversifolia Lem.; Rhexia inaequilateralis Schltdl. & Cham.; Rhexia parvifolia Schltdl.

= Centradenia inaequilateralis =

Species of flowering plant

Centradenia inaequilateralis is a species of flowering plant in the family Melastomataceae, native to southern Mexico, and Central America. With its pink-purple flowers, its cultivar 'Cascade' has gained the Royal Horticultural Society's Award of Garden Merit.
