= Tallow wood =

Tallow wood is a common name for several plants and may refer to:

- Eucalyptus microcorys, native to eastern Australia
- Ximenia americana, widely distributed in the tropics

== See also ==
- Tallow tree
