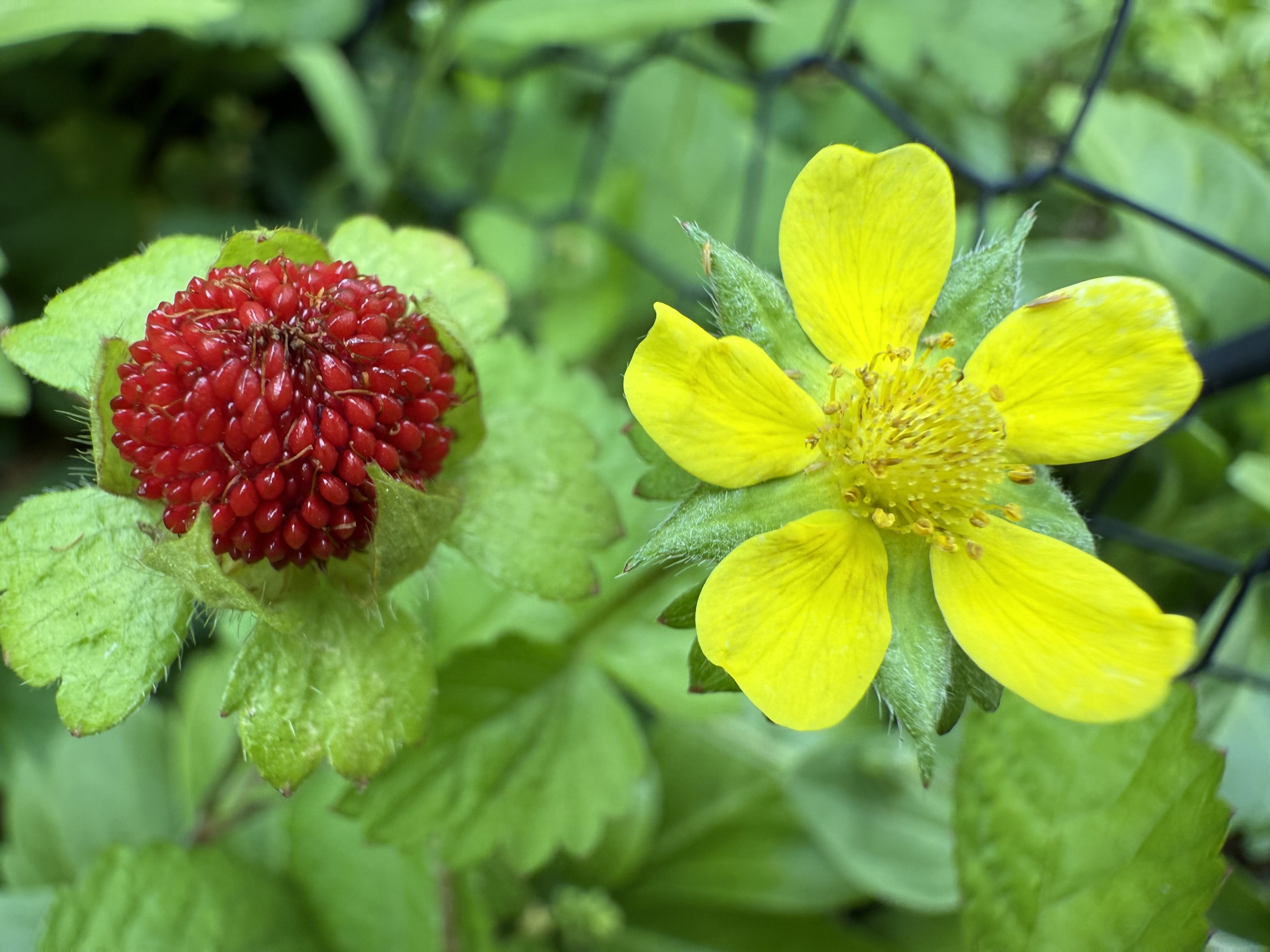

Scientific classification
- Kingdom: Plantae
- Clade: Tracheophytes
- Clade: Angiosperms
- Clade: Eudicots
- Clade: Rosids
- Order: Rosales
- Family: Rosaceae
- Genus: Potentilla
- Species: P. indica

Binomial name
- Potentilla indica (Andrews) Th.Wolf

Synonyms
- Duchesnea indica (Andrews) Teschem.; Duchesnea major (Makino) Makino; Fragaria indica Andrews; Fragaria malayana Roxb.; Fragaria nilagirica Zenker; Potentilla denticulosa Ser.; Potentilla durandii Torr. & A.Gray; Potentilla indica var. microphylla (T.T.Yu & T.C.Ku) H.Ohashi; Potentilla trifida Pall.

= Potentilla indica =

Species of flowering plant in the rose family

Potentilla indica, known commonly as false strawberry, mock strawberry, or Indian strawberry, (also snakeberry in North America) is a flowering plant in the family Rosaceae, native to West Asia to India, East Asia, and Southeast Asia. It has ternate foliage and an aggregate accessory fruit, similar to true strawberries of the genus Fragaria. Unlike the white or slightly pink flowers of true strawberries, Potentilla indica has yellow flowers, as do many other Potentilla species. It is native to eastern and southern Asia, but has naturalized in many regions worldwide. P. indica is an introduced species in the United States and Canada, often noticed as a weed on grass lawns.

Many sources consider this plant part of the genus Potentilla due to evidence from chloroplast genetic sequence data that the genus Duchesnea is included within Potentilla, though some still list it as Duchesnea indica.

== Description ==
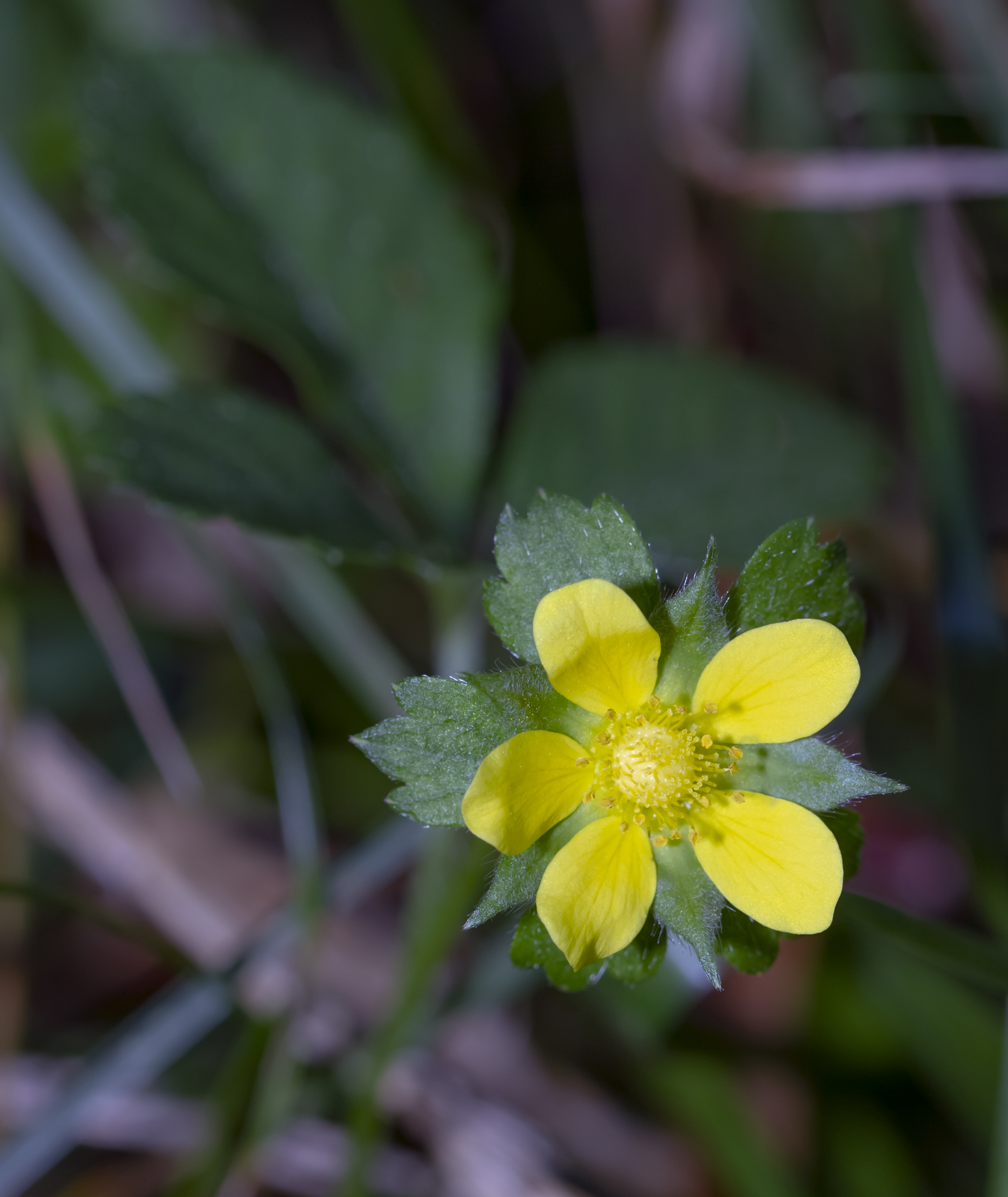
Potentilla indica bloom

The herbaceous plant spreads along creeping stolons, rooting and producing plantlets at each node. The leaves are trifoliate, dark green, and somewhat thick. The flowers are produced singly on axillary peduncles. The yellow petals of Potentilla indica have a nectar guide near the center of each petal that absorbs UV light more strongly than the rest of the petal and is visible only in the UV spectrum. The most common variety, Potentilla indica var. indica, has fruiting receptacles and achenes that are red and glossy. The rare variety D. indica f. albocaput Naruh., with white receptacles and cream achenes, has been reported only in Argentina and Japan.

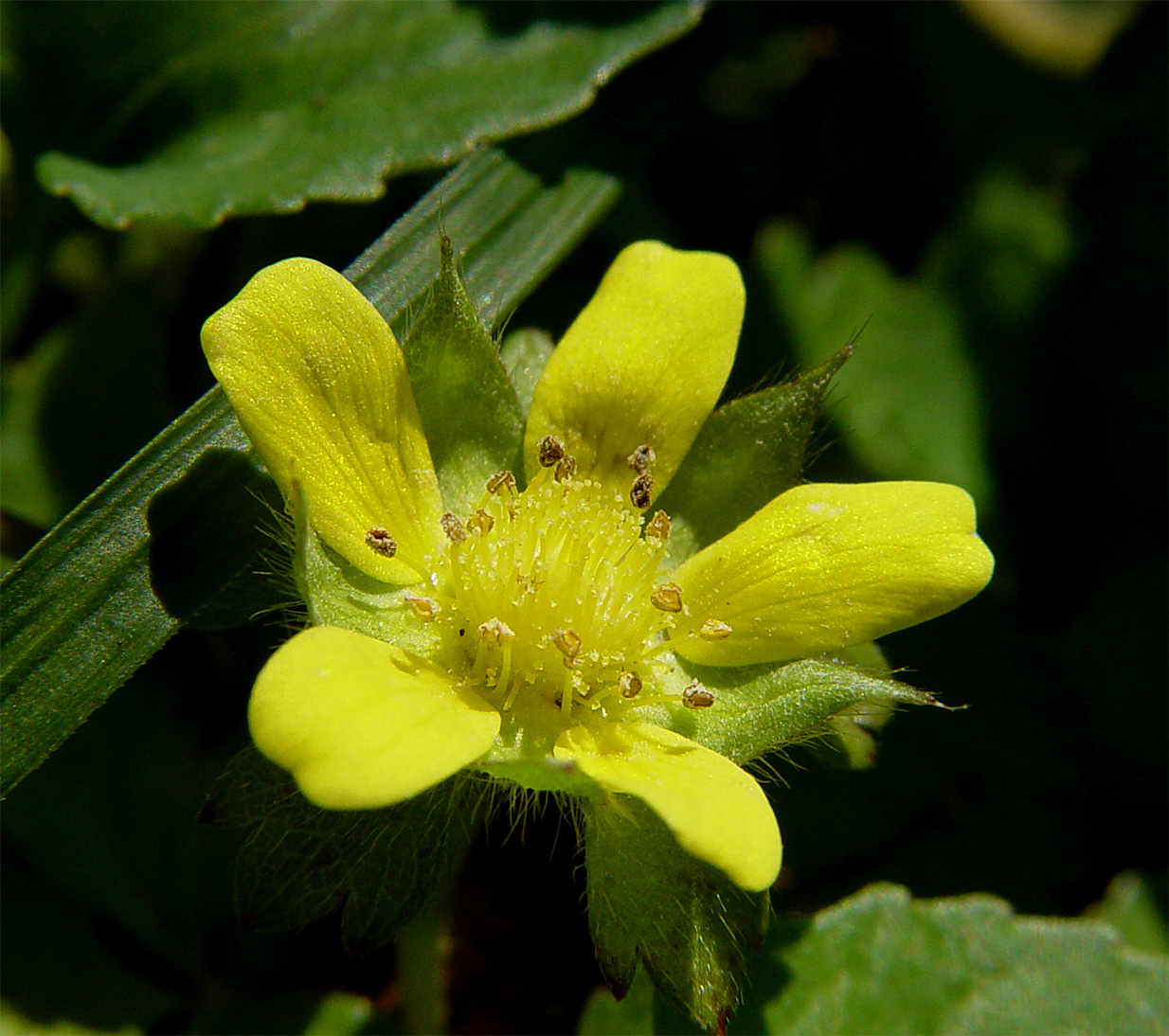
Blossom

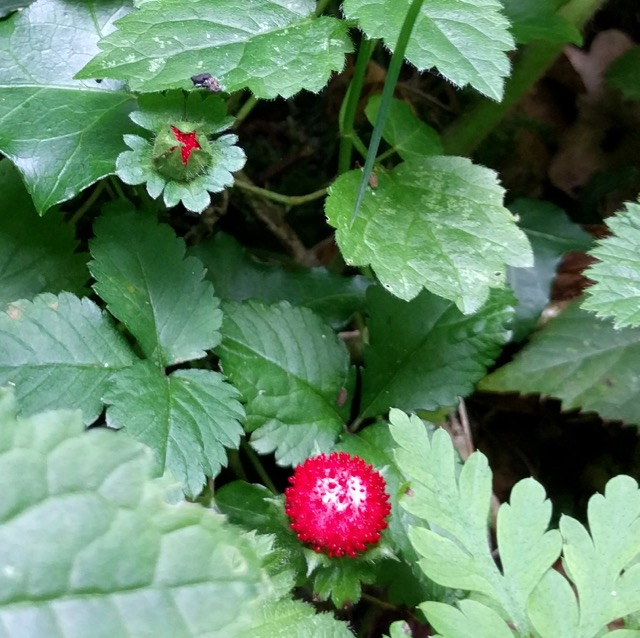
Mature fruit

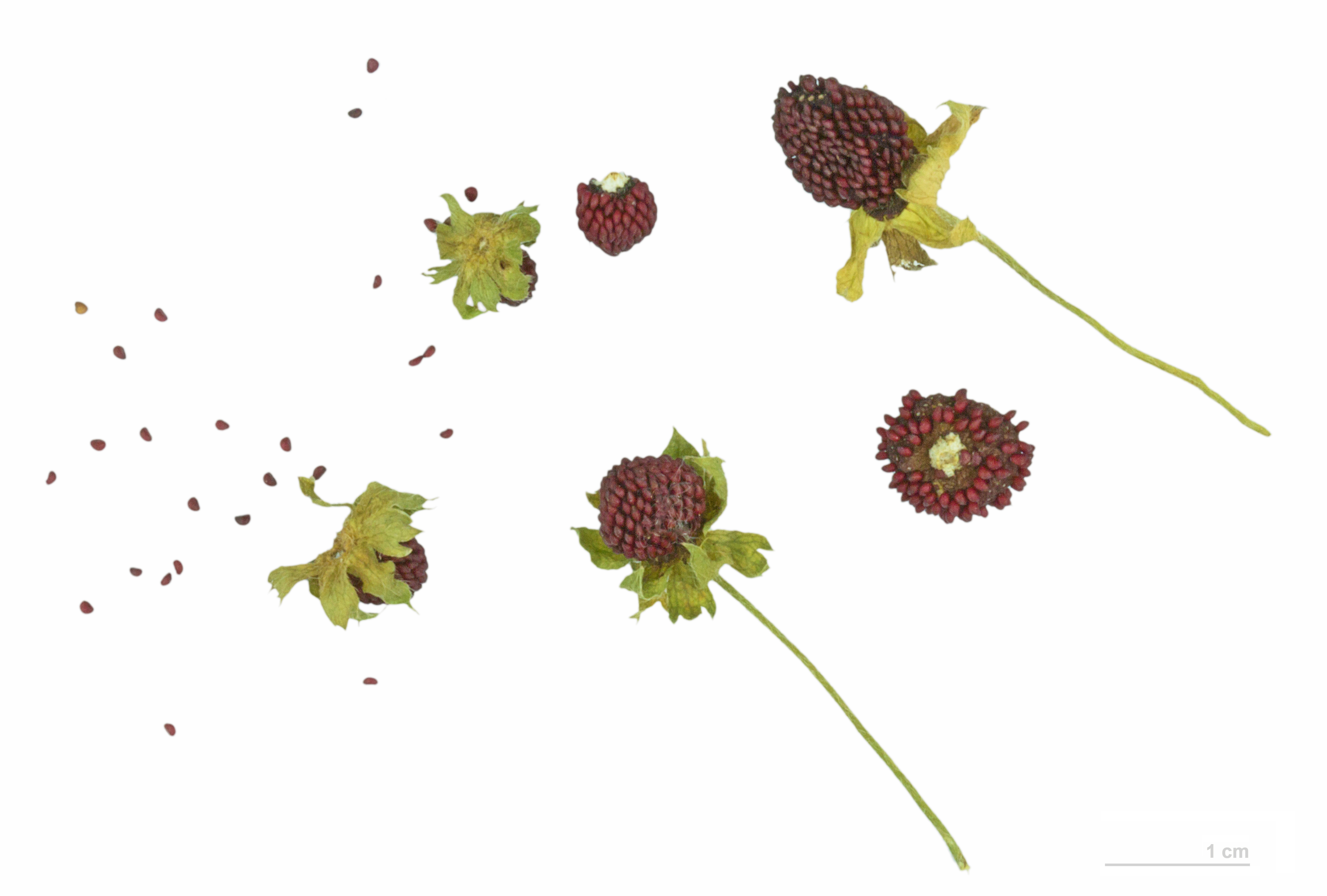
Dried fruits

== Invasiveness ==
Mock strawberry is considered invasive in some regions of the United States, where it may disrupt local ecosystems. Studies have shown that it can negatively impact the abundance of springtails and ants, affecting soil biodiversity.

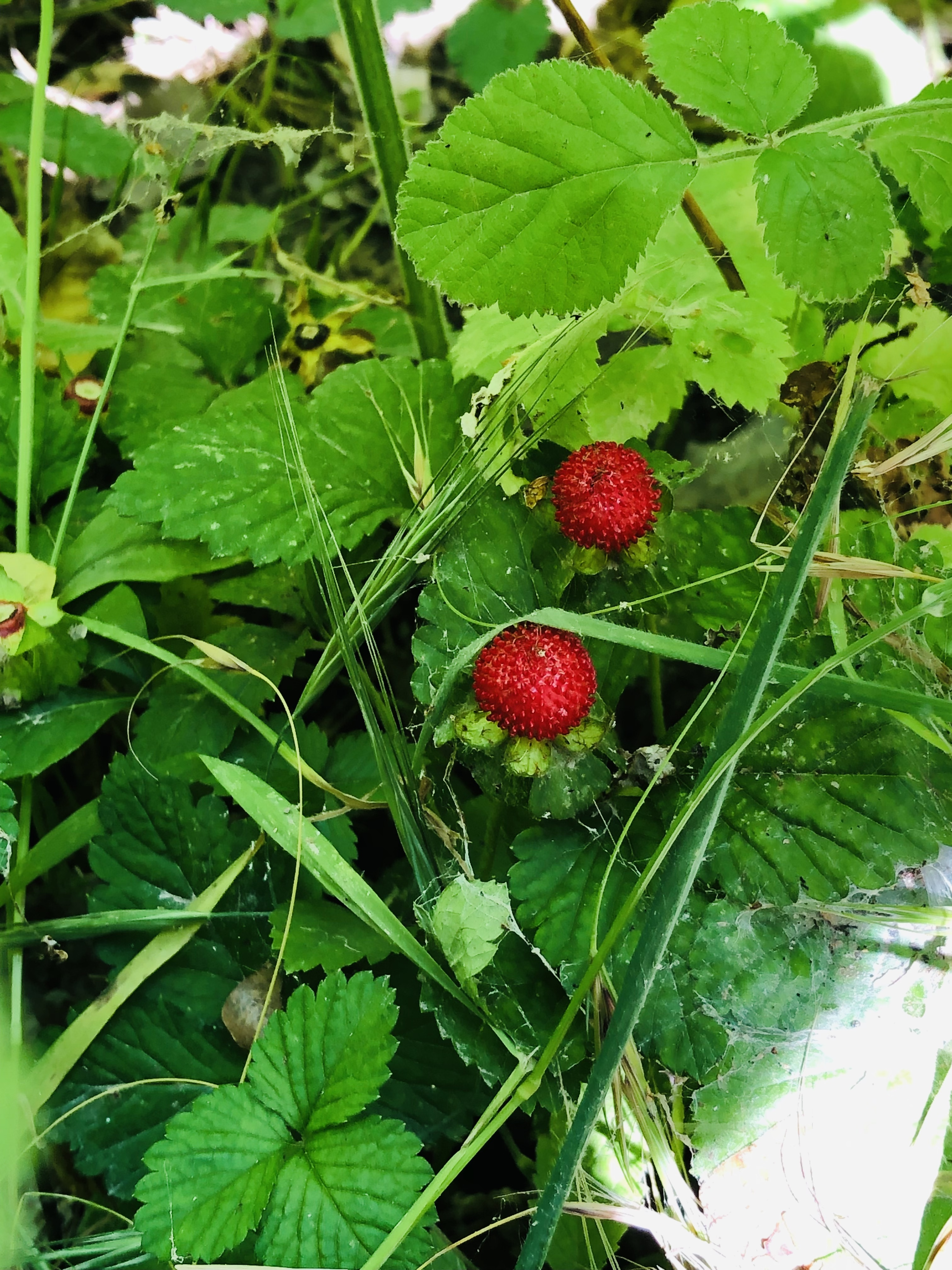
Potentilla indica

== Uses ==
The fresh berries are edible but considered less palatable than proper strawberries.

The cousin Potentilla fulgens is widely distributed in the Khasi Hills and Jaintia Hills, Meghalaya, northeastern India, where the plants are known in the Khasi as lyniangbru (and in English as "Himalayan cinquefoil" (Note: This common name is perhaps more commonly applied to Potentilla atrosanguinea.)), and usage of this species extends to the Potentilla genus. Roots of Potentilla are consumed (chewed) with betel nuts by the Khasi people, and the P. indica species is also used in this way.

There is recorded ethno-medicinal usage (in northeastern India) as anthelmintic to get rid of parasites (Note: Other sources list P. fulgens for treatment for intestinal parasites in Western Himalayas, rather than P. indica.) and to treat lung symptoms. A survey conducted in Assam, India, from 2018–2020 documented the use of Potentilla indica by traditional healers to treat asthma. In traditional Chinese medicine, it is used for clearing heat, cooling blood, detumescence, and detoxication.
