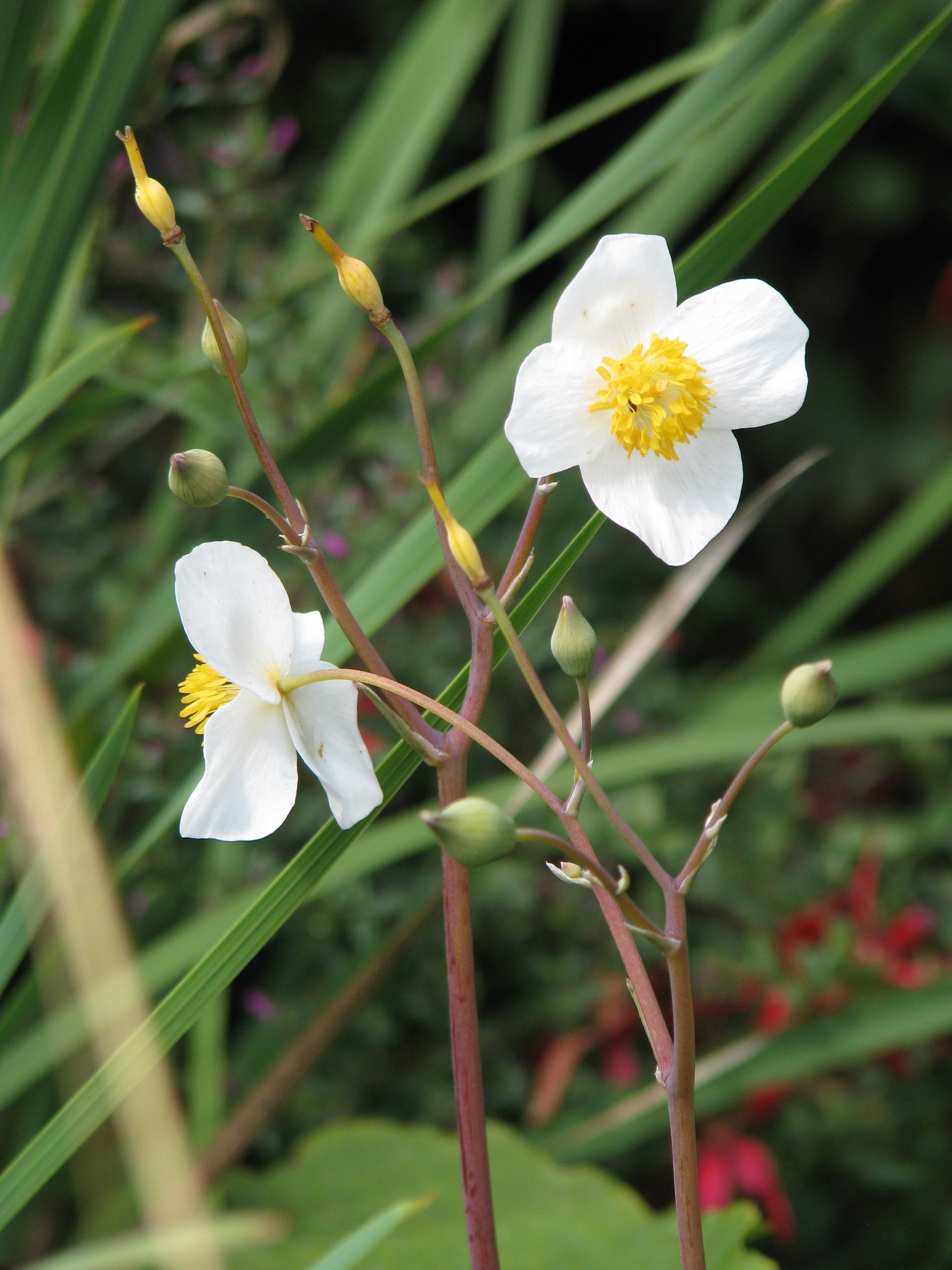

Scientific classification
- Kingdom: Plantae
- Clade: Tracheophytes
- Clade: Angiosperms
- Clade: Eudicots
- Order: Ranunculales
- Family: Papaveraceae
- Subfamily: Papaveroideae
- Tribe: Chelidonieae
- Genus: Eomecon; Hance
- Species: E. chionantha

Binomial name
- Eomecon chionantha Hance

= Eomecon =

Genus of flowering plants

Eomecon is a monotypic genus of flowering plants in the poppy family containing the single species Eomecon chionantha. Its common names include snow-poppy and dawn-poppy. It is native to China.

This perennial herb produces stolons from its branching rootstock, spreading to form patches on the ground. Its roots are orange. The leaves are all basal, borne on bluish petioles up to 30 centimeters long. The leaf blades are heart-shaped or kidney-shaped, with wavy, scalloped edges. They are greenish, sometimes with a purple tinge on the undersides. They are up to 26 centimeters long by 20 wide. The scape is blue-gray with a mauve tint. It grows up to 40 centimeters tall and bears 3 to 5 flowers. The flower bud is about a centimeter long and pointed. The open flower has two membranous sepals that join to form a spathe. The four white petals are up to 2.5 centimeters long and are arranged in two layers. At the center of the flower are over 70 stamens with yellow anthers. The fruit is a capsule about 2 centimeters long.

Extracts of this plant have been effective at eliminating the freshwater snail Oncomelania hupensis, the intermediate host of Schistosoma japonicum, a fluke that causes schistosomiasis. The molluscicidal compounds in the plant are alkaloids.

== Chemical composition ==
It contains the toxic alkaloid sanguinarine. Other alkaloids include chelerythrine, protopine and alpha-allocryptopine.
