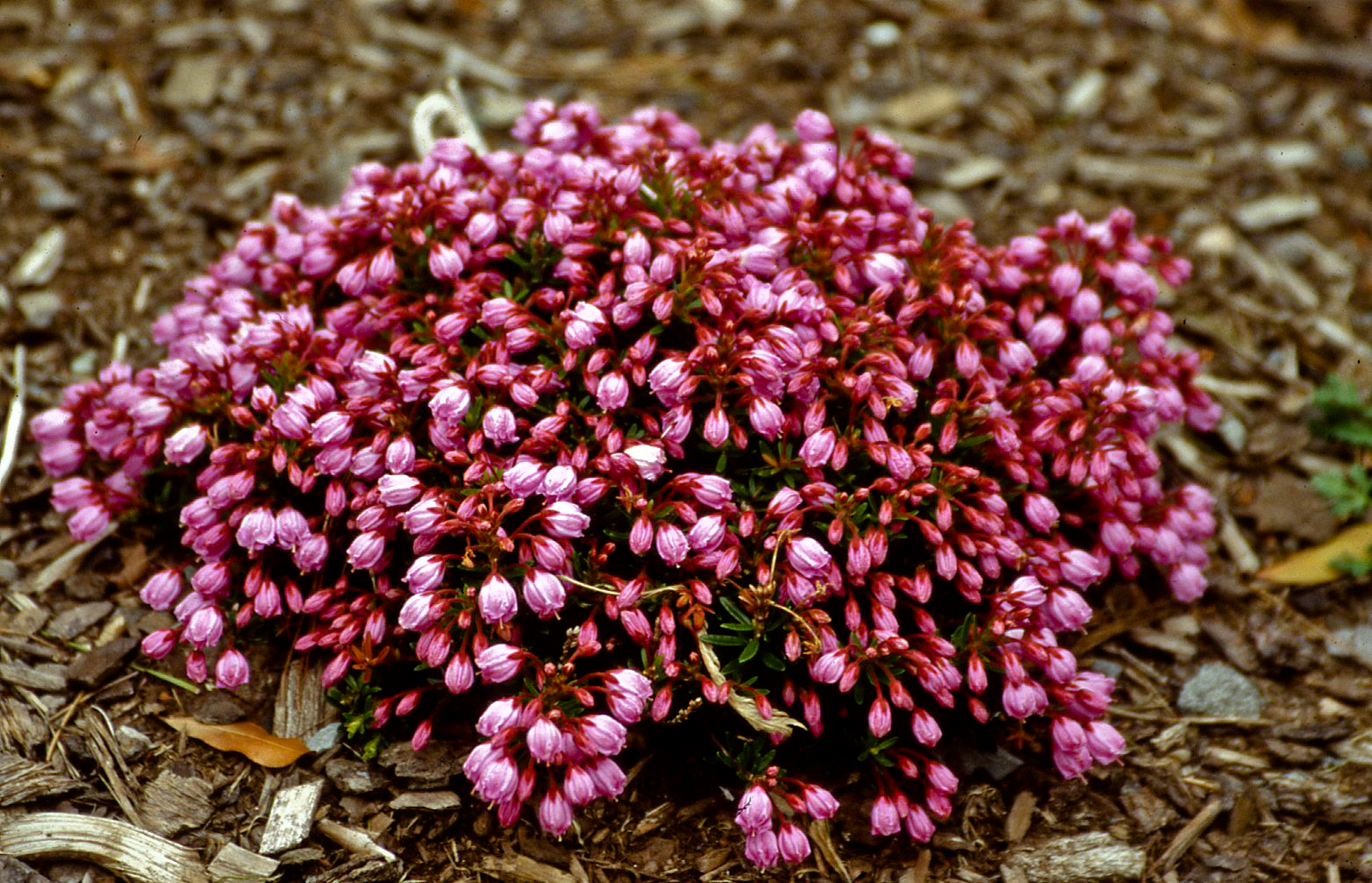
- × Phylliopsis hillieri 'Sugar Plum'

Scientific classification
- Kingdom: Plantae
- Clade: Embryophytes
- Clade: Tracheophytes
- Clade: Angiosperms
- Clade: Eudicots
- Clade: Asterids
- Order: Ericales
- Family: Ericaceae
- Subfamily: Ericoideae
- Tribe: Phyllodoceae
- Genus: × Phylliopsis; Cullen & Lancaster

Species
- See text

= × Phylliopsis =

Nothogenus of flowering plants

× Phylliopsis is a nothogenus of flowering plants in the heath and heather family Ericaceae. Artificially created hybrids, they are the result of crosses between species of two distinct heath genera, Kalmiopsis (found only in Oregon) and Phyllodoce (the mountainheaths). This type of intergeneric hybridization is quite rare, and is indicated by a multiplication symbol before the name. The name Phylliopsis is an example of a portmanteau word, a combination of the two parents' names. The cultivar × Phylliopsis 'Coppelia' has gained the Royal Horticultural Society's Award of Garden Merit. The RHS lists the nominal species name as Phylliopsis hillieri.
