= Testudinaria =

Scientific classification
- Domain: Eukaryota
- Kingdom: Animalia
- Phylum: Arthropoda
- Subphylum: Chelicerata
- Class: Arachnida
- Order: Araneae
- Infraorder: Araneomorphae
- Family: Araneidae
- Genus: Testudinaria; Taczanowski, 1879

Type species
- T. geometrica Taczanowski, 1879

Species
- 9, see text

Synonyms
- Nanduti Mello-Leitão, 1945

Genus of spiders

Testudinaria is a genus of orb-weaver spiders first described by Władysław Taczanowski in 1879.

== Species ==
As of April 2019 it contains nine species:

- Testudinaria bonaldoi Levi, 2005 – Brazil
- Testudinaria debsmithae Levi, 2005 – Suriname to Peru, Bolivia
- Testudinaria elegans Taczanowski, 1879 – Panama to Peru
- Testudinaria geometrica Taczanowski, 1879 (type) – Panama to Peru, Brazil
- Testudinaria gravatai Levi, 2005 – Brazil
- Testudinaria lemniscata (Simon, 1893) – Brazil
- Testudinaria quadripunctata Taczanowski, 1879 – Venezuela to Peru, Bolivia, Brazil
- Testudinaria rosea (Mello-Leitão, 1945) – Argentina
- Testudinaria unipunctata (Simon, 1893) – Brazil
