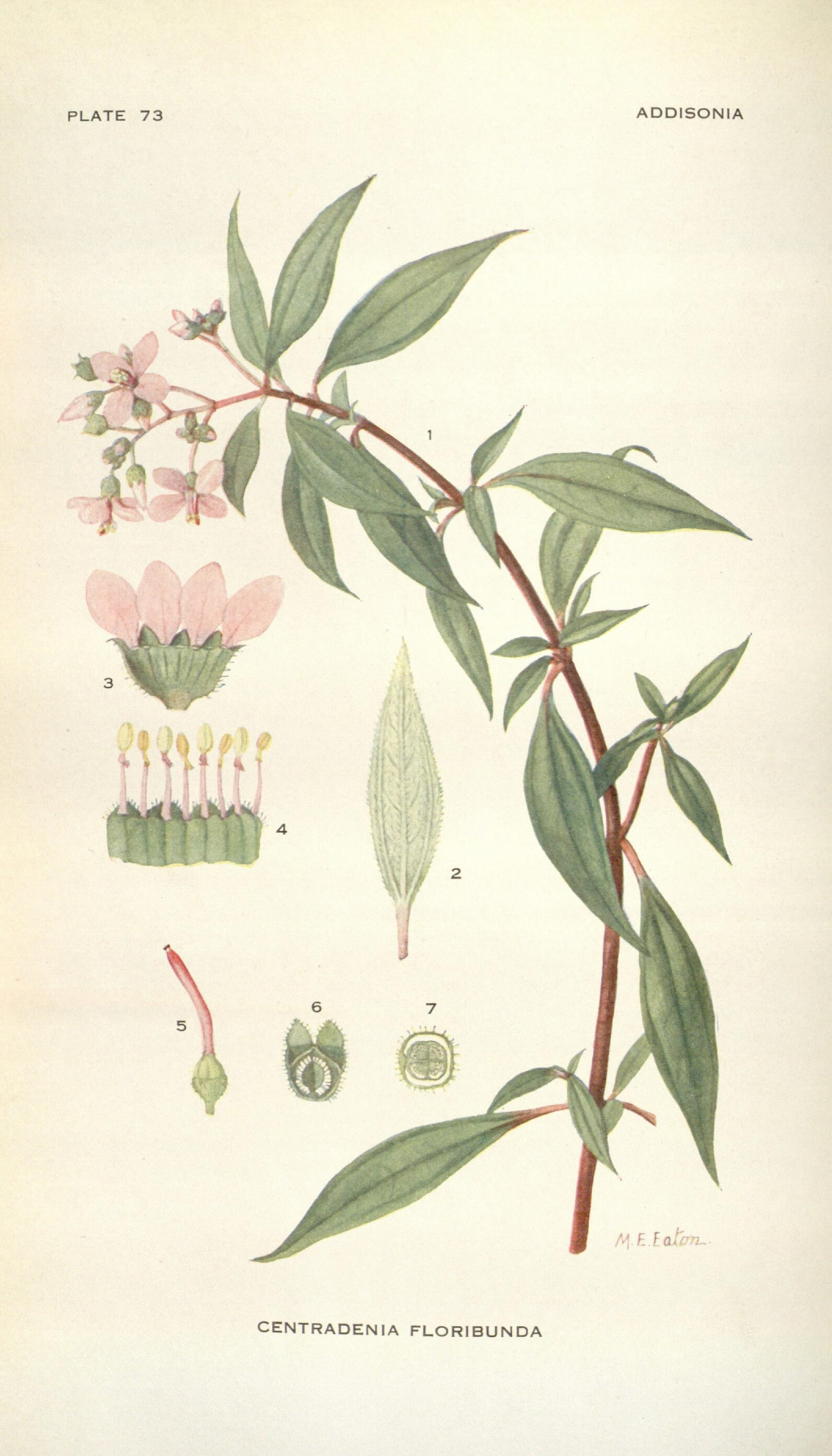
- Centradenia floribunda by Mary Emily Eaton

Scientific classification
- Kingdom: Plantae
- Clade: Embryophytes
- Clade: Tracheophytes
- Clade: Angiosperms
- Clade: Eudicots
- Clade: Rosids
- Order: Myrtales
- Family: Melastomataceae
- Genus: Centradenia; G.Don

Species
- See text

= Centradenia =

Genus of flowering plants

Centradenia is a genus of 4-5 species of tropical evergreen perennials or subshrubs, native to Central America and Mexico.

== Description ==
Centradenia spp. Branches are angled or winged and the stems are often colored. The leaves are lanceolate or ovate, pointy, simple and opposite with well-defined veining, somewhat velvety, and often flushed with red on the undersides. Flowers have a 4-lobed calyx, 4 petals, 8 stamens, and a 4-loculed ovary, pink or white. It is a lovely, bushy plant that produces clusters of small pink to mauve flowers in panicles either terminally or along the branches in winter.

=== Species ===
Centradenia cascade
Centradenia grandifolia - princess flower, sea of flowers
Centradenia inaequilateralis
Centradenia floribunda
Centradenia rosea

== Cultivation ==
Centradenia are showy and desirable plants for the garden in subtropical and tropical areas. The plants are grown in rich leaf-mold with sharp, sandy, well-drained soil in partial shade with light. Strong plants are greatly benefited by liquid manure, and such applications give better colors in both flowers and fruits. Propagate from seed or cuttings.
