= Clytostoma =

Extinct genus of flowering plants

Clytostoma was a genus of woody-stemmed vines from tropical America, native to Argentina and the southern part of Brazil. It is now considered a synonym of Bignonia. The botanical name comes from the Greek, klytos means splendid or beauteous, and stoma means mouth; alluding to the beautiful flowers. It was formerly separated from Bignonia chiefly on the basis of its simple slender tendrils, the short disk, and its habit of clambering over adjacent foliage using tendrils to hang on tight. The bright glossy green leaves of species formerly placed in this genus are lobed and divided with 2 leaflets, about 3in (7.6 cm) long and 1.5in (3.8 cm) wide. They are arranged opposite in pairs and tendrils arise at the ends of the leaf stalks. In late spring, the spectacular 1.5in (3.8 cm) trumpet flowers are borne terminally or along the branches. The flowers are pale lavender and delicately detailed with dark violet and purple veins. Flowers are followed by large prickly seed pods. This evergreen ornamental plant easily reaches to 16 feet and is a carefree grower.
