= Trailing bellflower =

Trailing bellflower is a common name for several ornamental plants in the bellflower family and may refer to:

- Campanula poscharskyana
- Cyananthus lobatus
