= Rajania =

Scientific classification
- Kingdom: Plantae
- Clade: Tracheophytes
- Clade: Angiosperms
- Clade: Monocots
- Order: Dioscoreales
- Family: Dioscoreaceae
- Genus: Rajania; L.

Synonyms
- Raja Burm. in C. Plumier

Genus of flowering plants

Rajania is a genus of plants in the Dioscoreaceae. It is native to the West Indies, with 14 of the 17 known species found in Cuba.

- Rajania angustifolia Sw. - Cuba, Haiti
- Rajania cephalocarpa Uline ex R.Knuth - Cuba
- Rajania cordata L. - Cuba, Hispaniola, Puerto Rico, Jamaica, Lesser Antilles
- Rajania ekmanii R.Knuth - Cuba
- Rajania hastata L. - Hispaniola
- Rajania microphylla Kunth - Bahamas, Cuba
- Rajania nipensis R.A.Howard - Cuba
- Rajania ovata Sw. - Cuba, Hispaniola
- Rajania pilifera Urb. - Haiti
- Rajania porulosa R.Knuth - Cuba
- Rajania psilostachya (Kunth) Uline - Cuba
- Rajania quinquefolia L. - Cuba, Hispaniola
- Rajania spiculiflora Uline ex R.Knuth - Haiti
- Rajania tenella R.A.Howard - Cuba
- Rajania tenuiflora R.Knuth - Cuba, Hispaniola
- Rajania theresensis Uline ex R.Knuth - Cuba
- Rajania wrightii Uline ex R.Knuth - Cuba
