= Fleeceflower =

Fleeceflower is a common name for genera and species in the subfamily Polygonoideae, and may refer to:

- Bistorta affinis, synonym Persicaria affinis
- Fallopia
- Koenigia alpina
- Koenigia × fennica, particularly the cultivar 'Johanneswolke' called "Persicaria polymorpha" in horticulture
- Persicaria
- Polygonum
- Reynoutria japonica
