= Blood lily =

Blood lily is a common name for several plants and may refer to:

- the genus Haemanthus collectively, particularly

- Haemanthus coccineus, a scarlet-flowered bulbous plant native to southern Africa

- the genus Scadoxus collectively, particularly

- Scadoxus multiflorus, a red-flowered bulbous plant native to much of Africa and parts of the Arabian peninsula
- Scadoxus puniceus, a red-flowered bulbous plant native to southern and eastern Africa
