= × Ascocenda =

Genus of orchids

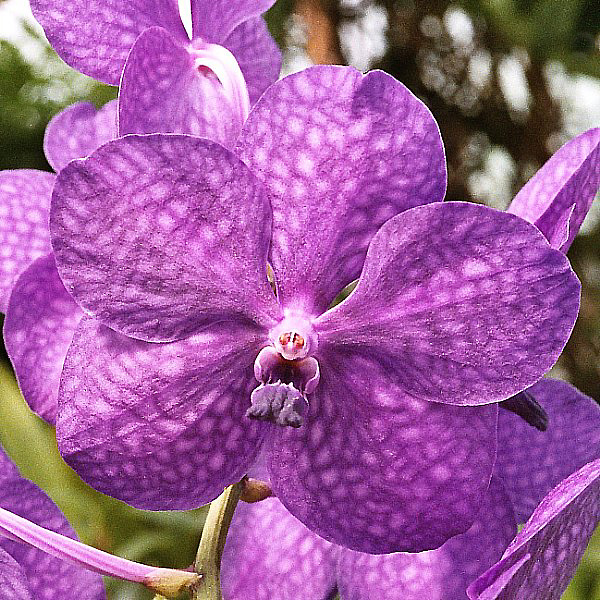
Ascocenda Princess Mikasa 'Sapphire'

× Ascocenda, abbreviated as Ascda in the horticultural trade, was a human-made hybrid orchid genus resulting from a cross between the former genus Ascocentrum and Vanda (Asctm × V). It was first described in Orchid Rev. 57: 172 (1949). Ascocentrum is now synonymous with Vanda, so the name is obsolete. Hybrids in the nothogenus × Ascocenda are now properly termed Vanda.

× Ascocenda hybrids are common in cultivation with numerous cultivars and often combine the large flower size of the Vanda parents with the color and compactness of the Ascocentrum parents.

They are evergreen compact epiphytes with upright, narrow, oviform leaves. The inflorescence is an axillary cluster with 6 to 8 open flowers. They bloom twice or sometimes three times a year with long lasting flowers. The flowers are brightly colored, often overlaid with contrasting colors.
