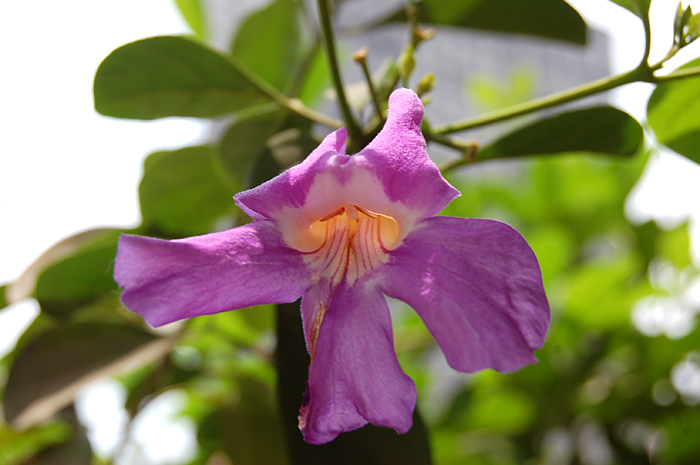

Scientific classification
- Kingdom: Plantae
- Clade: Tracheophytes
- Clade: Angiosperms
- Clade: Eudicots
- Clade: Asterids
- Order: Lamiales
- Family: Bignoniaceae
- Genus: Bignonia
- Species: B. magnifica

Binomial name
- Bignonia magnifica W.Bull

Synonyms
- Arrabidaea magnifica (W.Bull) Sprague ex Steenis; Saritaea magnifica (W.Bull) Dugand

= Bignonia magnifica =

Species of plant

Bignonia magnifica, known as glowvine, is a species in the trumpet-vine family, Bignoniaceae. Originally described in the genus Bignonia in 1879, it was later transferred to the monotypic genus Saritaea as the sole species Saritaea magnifica, but has since been restored to Bignonia. It is native to Panama and northern South America (Colombia, Ecuador and Venezuela), but has been introduced elsewhere.

== Description ==
The stems are almost round in cross-section, and are marked with longitudinal stripes. The 10 cm leaves have two leaflets and a further two leaflet-like appendages at the base of the leaf stalk, plus a tendril at the tip. The leaves are smooth and leathery. The plant is a showy-flowering, evergreen tropical climber. The large heads of rosy mauve to purple coloured, bell-shaped flowers 8 cm long with hairy yellow throat, borne at the ends of the branches, often appear year-round. When in flower, it is regarded as one of the outstanding climbers of the world. In its native territory, the nectar is collected by the male bees of the tropical genus Euglossa, which pollinate the flowers by brushing against the pollen and transferring it to the stigma. The fruit is a long, flattened, capsule containing two-winged seeds.

== Cultivation ==
The plant needs a warm-subtropical or tropical climate to be seen at its best, as well as well-drained moisture-retaining soil with much humus. Propagated from seed and cuttings.
