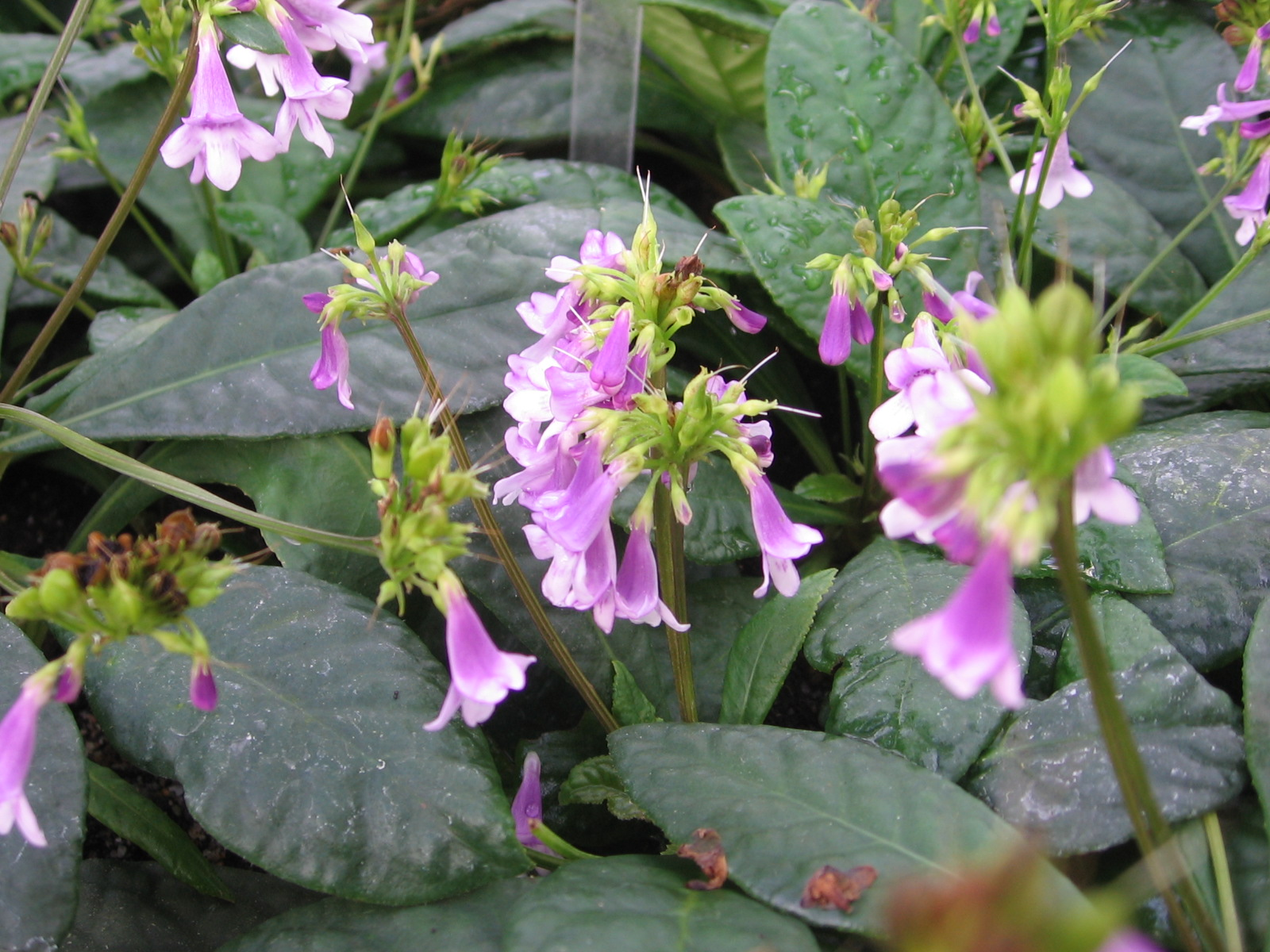
- Tetranema roseum in bloom

Scientific classification
- Kingdom: Plantae
- Clade: Embryophytes
- Clade: Tracheophytes
- Clade: Angiosperms
- Clade: Eudicots
- Clade: Asterids
- Order: Lamiales
- Family: Plantaginaceae
- Tribe: Russelieae
- Genus: Tetranema; Benth.

Species
- See text

Synonyms
- Allophyton Brandegee

= Tetranema =

Genus of flowering plants

Tetranema is a genus of flowering plants in the family Plantaginaceae, native to Mexico and Central America. There has been some taxonomic debate over its family placement, with Gesneriaceae and Scrophulariaceae having been proposed.

== Species ==
Currently accepted species include:

- Tetranema evoluta Donn.Sm.
- Tetranema floribundum Hammel & Grayum
- Tetranema gamboanum Grayum & Hammel
- Tetranema megaphyllum (Brandegee) L.O.Williams
- Tetranema michaelfayanum Christenh.
- Tetranema roseum (M.Martens & Galeotti) Standl. & Steyerm.
