= Heterocentron =

Scientific classification
- Kingdom: Plantae
- Clade: Tracheophytes
- Clade: Angiosperms
- Clade: Eudicots
- Clade: Rosids
- Order: Myrtales
- Family: Melastomataceae
- Genus: Heterocentron; Hook. & Arn.

Genus of plants

Heterocentron is a genus of flowering plants belonging to the family Melastomataceae.

Its native range is Mexico to Colombia.

Species:

- Heterocentron alatum Rose & Standl.
- Heterocentron chimalapanum Todzia
- Heterocentron elegans (Schltdl.) Kuntze
- Heterocentron evansii Almeda
- Heterocentron glandulosum Schrenk
- Heterocentron hirtellum (Cogn.) L.O.Williams
- Heterocentron laxiflorum Standl.
- Heterocentron mexicanum Hook. & Arn.
- Heterocentron muricatum Gleason
- Heterocentron purpureum S.Winkl.
- Heterocentron subtriplinervium (Link & Otto) A.Braun & C.D.Bouché
- Heterocentron suffruticosum Brandegee
