= Tallow tree =

Tallow tree is a common name for several tree species and may refer to:

- Detarium senegalense, native to tropical West Africa
- Triadica sebifera, native to eastern Asia

== See also ==
- Tallow wood
