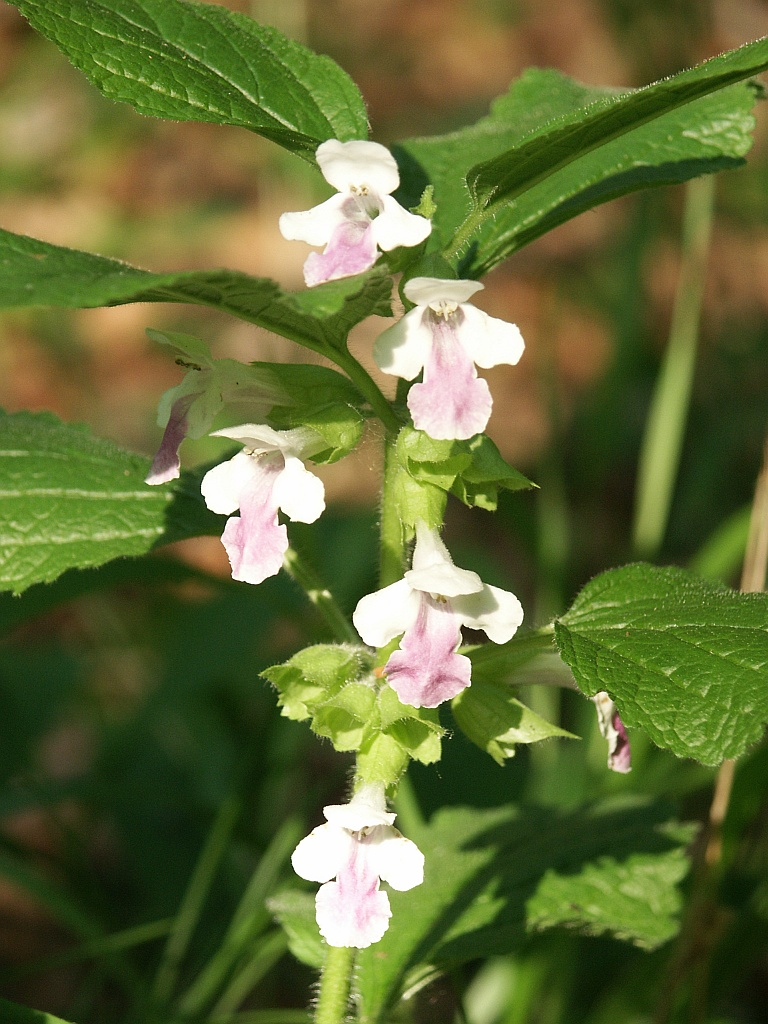

Scientific classification
- Kingdom: Plantae
- Clade: Tracheophytes
- Clade: Angiosperms
- Clade: Eudicots
- Clade: Asterids
- Order: Lamiales
- Family: Lamiaceae
- Subfamily: Lamioideae
- Genus: Melittis; L.
- Species: M. melissophyllum

Binomial name
- Melittis melissophyllum L.

Synonyms
- Melissophyllum Hill; Oenonea Bubani; Melittis melissifolium Salisb.; Melissophyllum silvaticum St-Lager; Melittis albida Guss.; Melittis carpatica Klokov; Melittis graeca Klokov; Melittis grandiflora Sm.; Melittis hispanica Klokov; Melittis kerneriana Klokov; Mellitis melissifolium Salisb; Melittis sarmatica Klokov; Melittis subcordata Klokov; Melittis sylvestrisLam.; Melissa tragi Garsault; Rehmannia chinensis Libosch. ex Fish. & Mey.; Oenonea melissifolia Bubani

= Melittis =

Bastard balm

Genus of flowering plants

Melittis melissophyllum is a species of flowering plant in the mint family, Lamiaceae. Its common name is bastard balm. It is the only species in the monotypic genus Melittis. The genus name is derived from the Greek melitta, which is in turn from melissa ("a bee").

Subspecies

- Melittis melissophyllum subsp. albida (Guss.) P.W.Ball - eastern Mediterranean from Sardinia to Turkey
- Melittis melissophyllum subsp. carpatica (Klokov) P.W.Ball - eastern Europe from Austria to Baltic States
- Melittis melissophyllum subsp. melissophyllum - western Europe from Britain to Spain + Italy

== Distribution ==
It is native to central and southern Europe from Ireland, Britain and Portugal east to Turkey + Ukraine + Baltic States.

== Description ==
Melittis melissophyllum reaches on average 30–50 centimetres (12–20 in) of height, with a minimum of 20 centimetres (7.9 in) and a maximum of 60 centimetres (24 in). It is a strongly aromatic plant with erect hairy stems. The root of this plant is a perennial short rhizome. This species is quite variable in leaf-shape and corolla-color. The leaves reach 5–9 centimetres (2.0–3.5 in) of length. They are oval, bluntly-toothed, quite hairy. They have a short petiole and are in opposite pairs up the stems. The inflorescence is composed of large pedunculated hermaphrodite flowers (two to six, or more) growing in the axils of the leaves. The flowers are labiate, arranged in pairs and are one-sided (all flowers "look" at the same side). They are usually white or pale pink with a large pinkish purple blotch on the lower lip. They are mainly pollinated by bees and moths. The flowering period extends from May through August.

== Habitat ==
The plant grows in shady deciduous woods, often with oak, beech, and chestnut. It can also be found among pines and junipers. It is common at altitudes of 0–1,400 metres (0–4,593 ft) above sea level.

== Cultivation ==
Bastard balm grows well as an edging in a sunny woodland or a scrubby border. It is attractive to insects. Cultivars include 'Royal Velvet Distinction'.

== Gallery ==
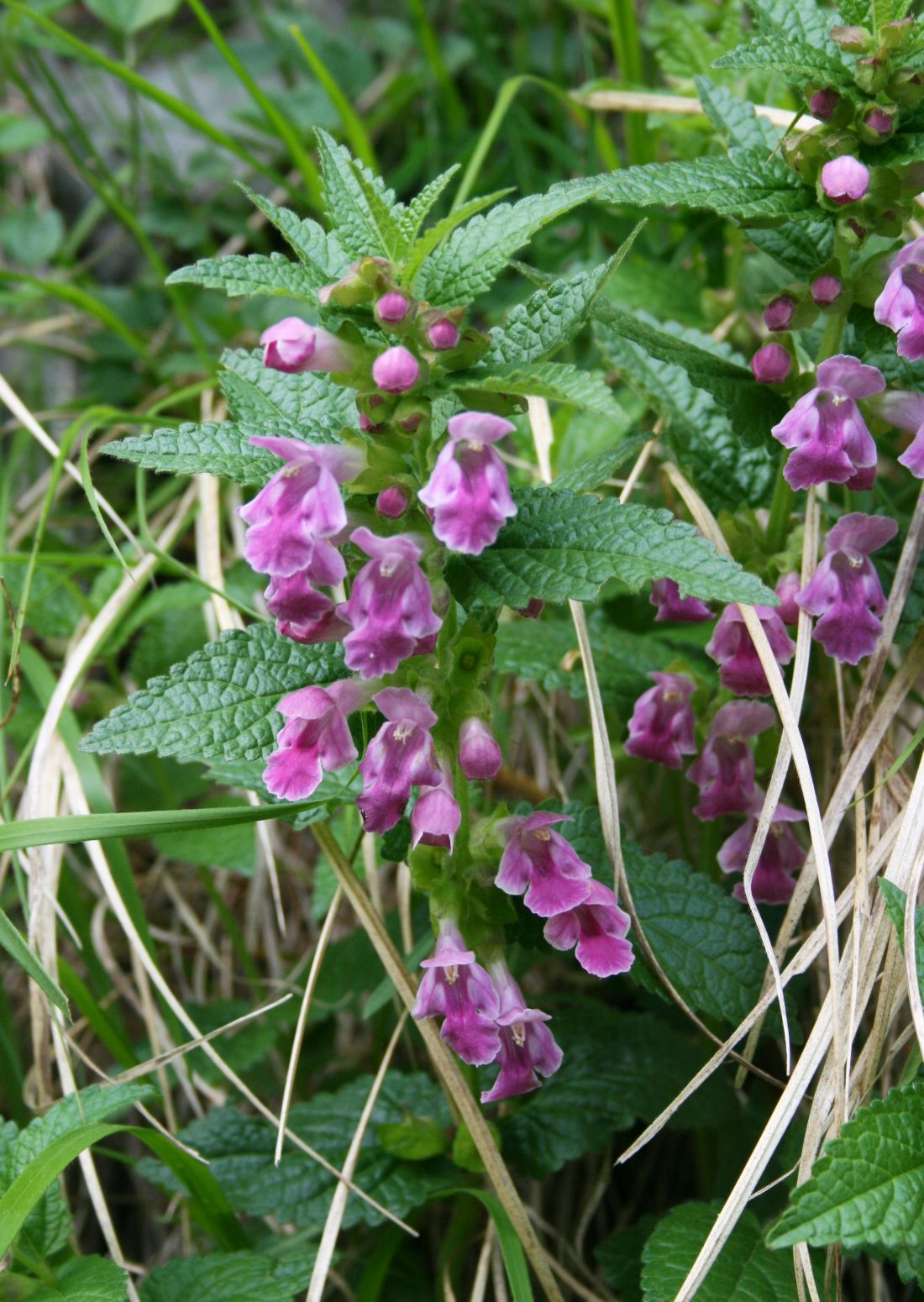
Form

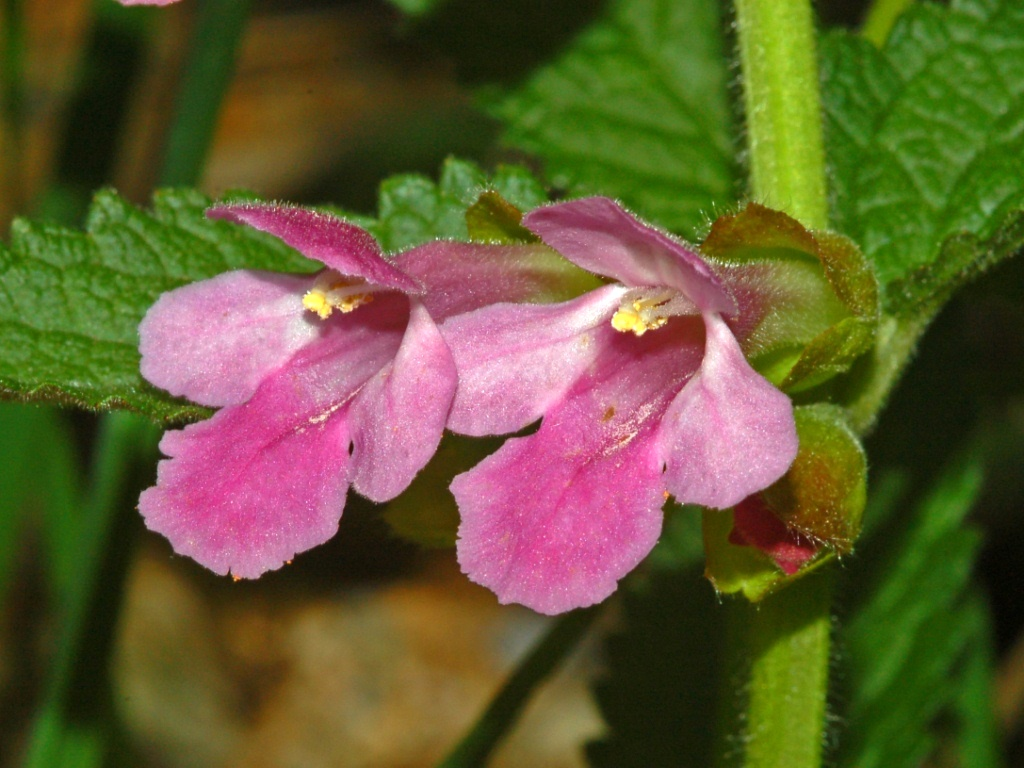
Flowers

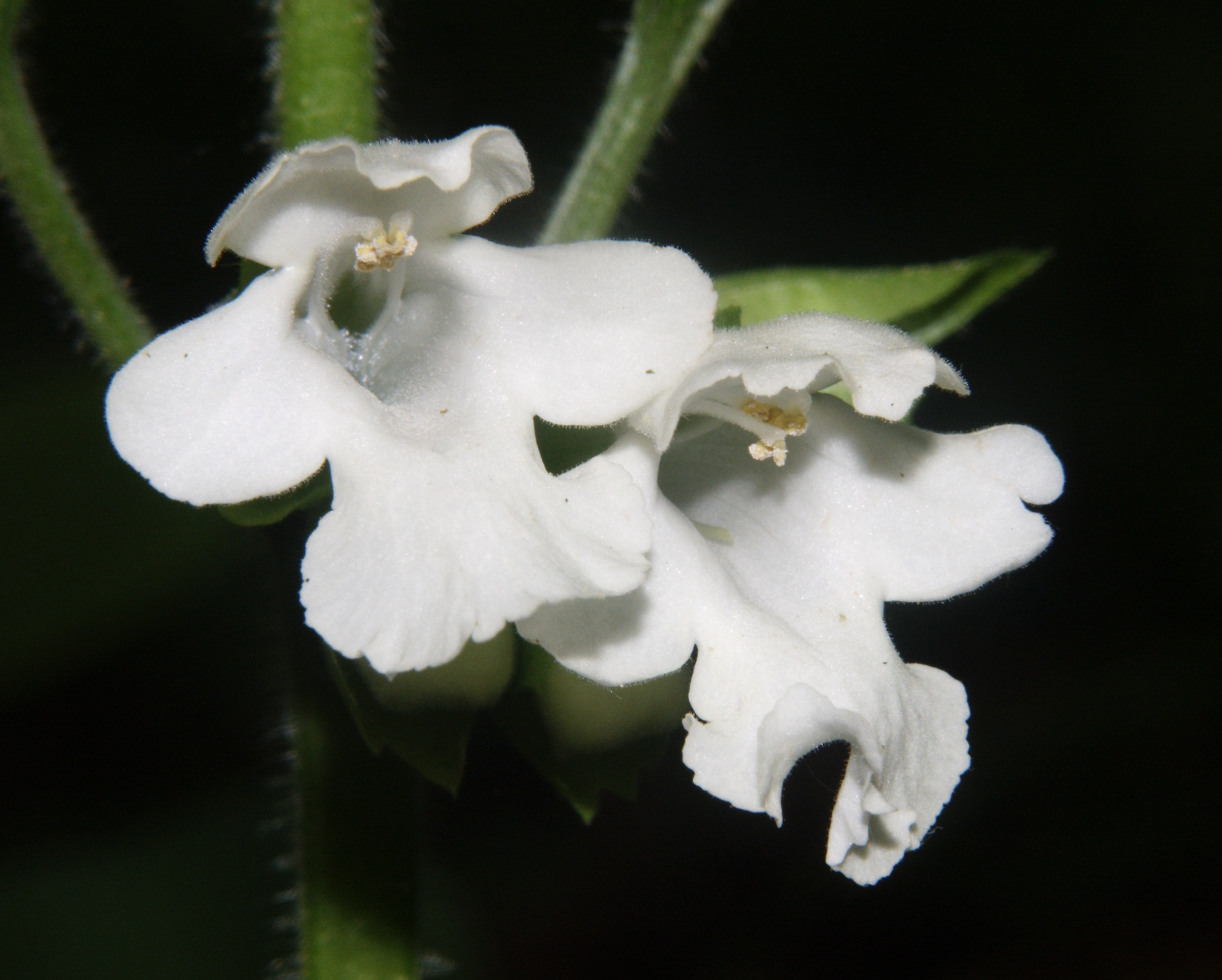
In white

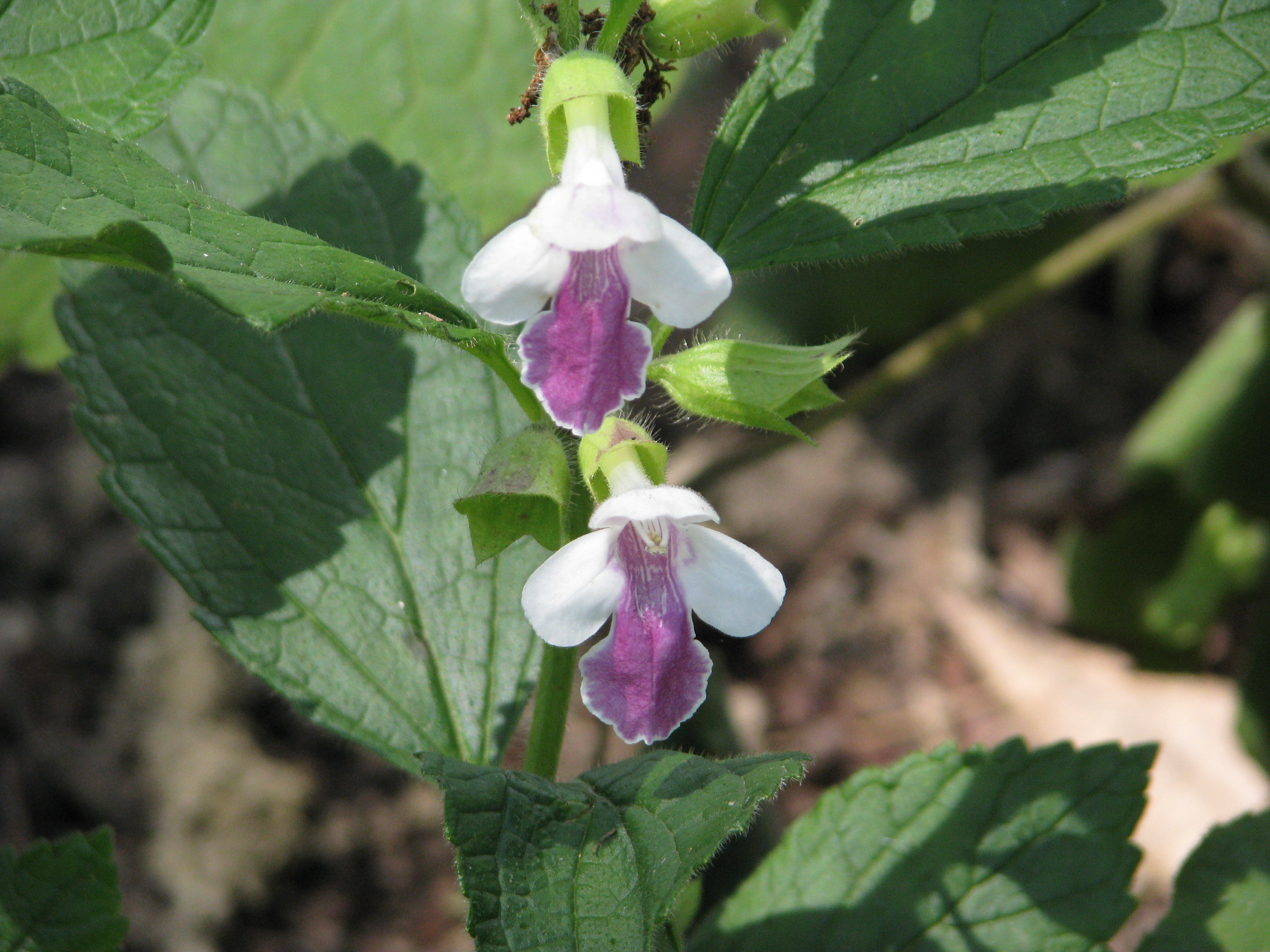
'Royal Velvet Distinction'

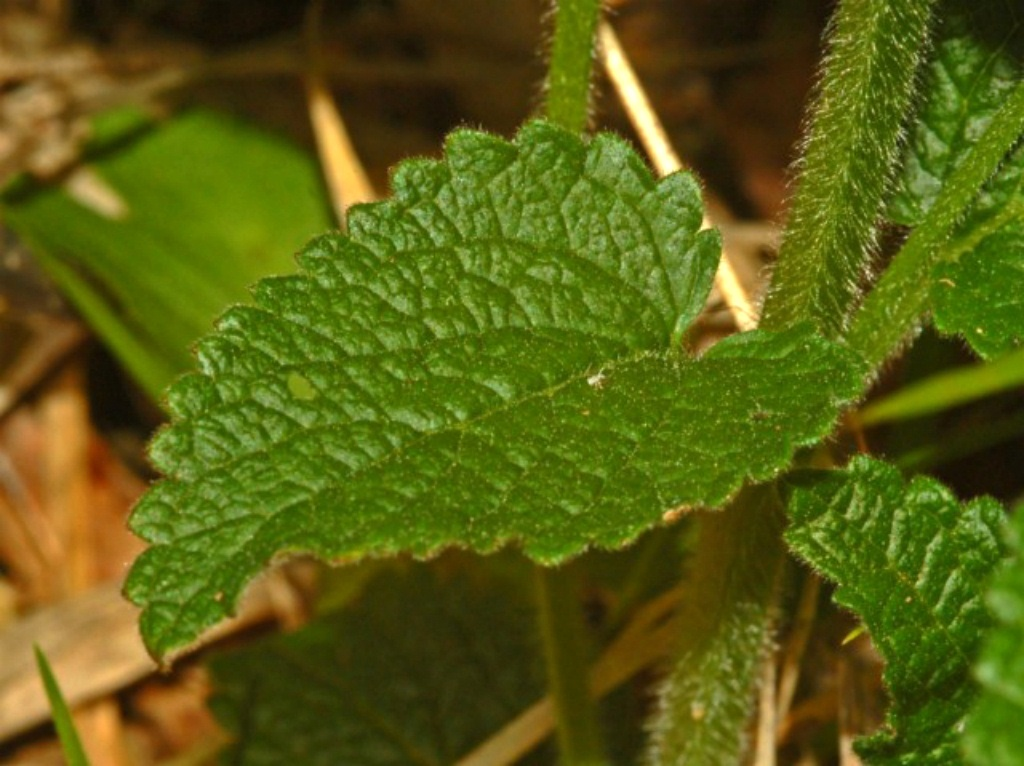
Leaf
