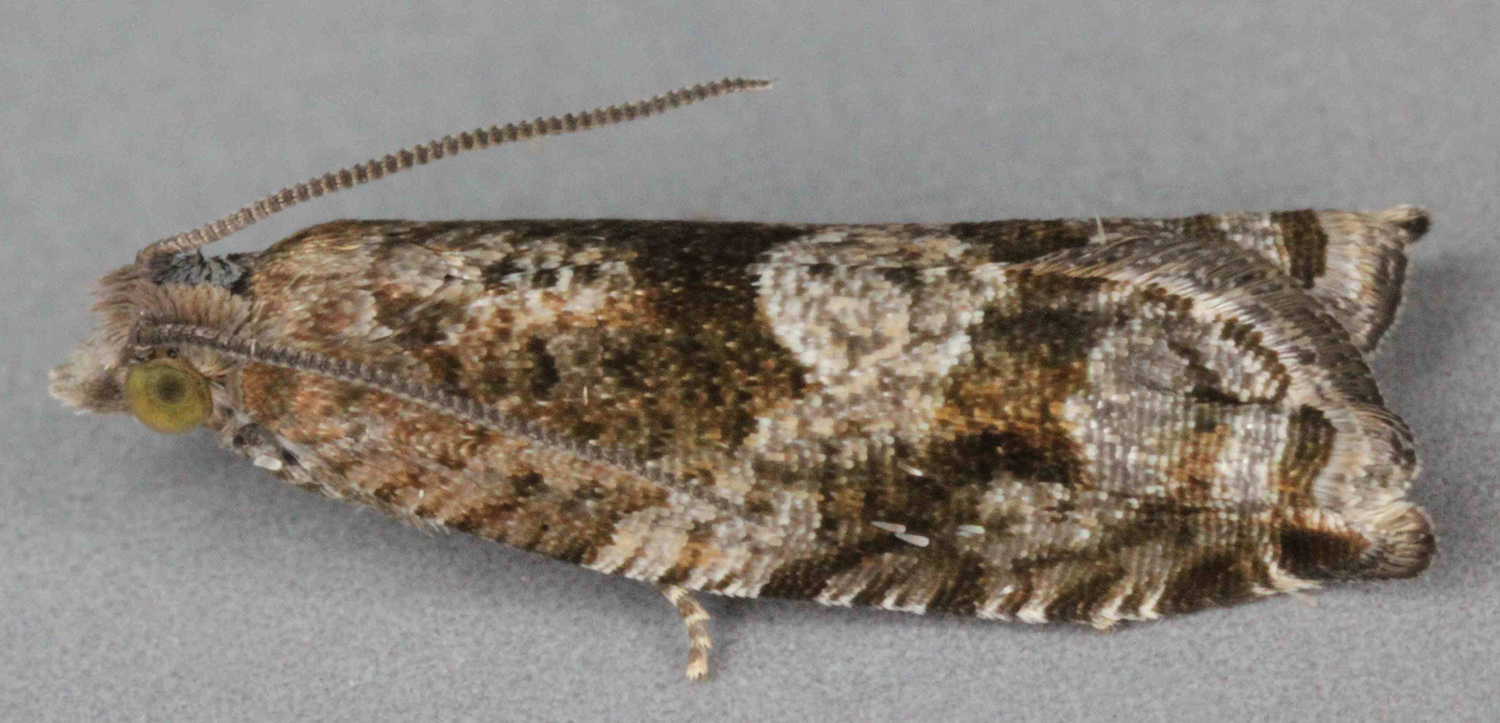

Scientific classification
- Kingdom: Animalia
- Phylum: Arthropoda
- Clade: Pancrustacea
- Class: Insecta
- Order: Lepidoptera
- Family: Tortricidae
- Genus: Rhopobota
- Species: R. naevana

Binomial name
- Rhopobota naevana (Hubner, [1814-1817])

Synonyms
- Tortrix naevana Hubner, [1814-1817]; Lithographia geminana Stephens, 1852; Epinotia ilicifoliana Kearfott, 1907; Sciaphila luctiferana Walker, 1863; Laspeyresia malivorella Matsumura, 1931; Acroclita microrrhyncha Meyrick, 1931; Rhopobota naebana Park, in Shin, 1983; Tortrix unipunctana Haworth, [1811]; Anchylopera vacciniana Packard, 1869

= Rhopobota naevana =

Species of moth

Rhopobota naevana, the holly tortrix moth, holly leaf tier or blackheaded fireworm, is a moth of the family Tortricidae. It is found from Europe (including the British Isles) to eastern Russia, China (Tianjin, Hebei, Inner Mongolia, Liaoning, Jilin, Heilongjiang, Zhejiang, Anhui, Fujian, Jiangxi, Henan, Hubei, Hunan, Guangdong, Sichuan, Guizhou, Yunnan, Tibet, Shaanxi, Gansu), Taiwan, Mongolia, Korea and Japan. It is also present in India, Sri Lanka and North America.

The wingspan is 12–16 mm. The forewings are grey, often obscurely striated or suffused with whitish. The large basal patch has an angulated edge, and is anteriorly suffused. The central fascia has a posterior median projection and is suffusedly dark fuscous, sometimes blackmarked. There are some small dark fuscous spots on costa posteriorly, and a suffused streak beneath them from the apex. The ocellus is broadly edged with light metallic-grey. The hindwings are grey; in male beneath suffused with black towards the costa. The larva is light grey-green, sides more yellowish; head black or blackish - brown; plate of 2 black Adults are on wing from late June to early September.

The larvae feed on Vaccinium, Erica carnea, Ilex, Malus, Crataegus, Sorbus, Prunus, Pyrus and Rhamnus.
