= Irish heath =

Irish heath is a common name for two closely related species of flowering plants in the heather family Ericaceae:

- Daboecia cantabrica
- Erica erigena
