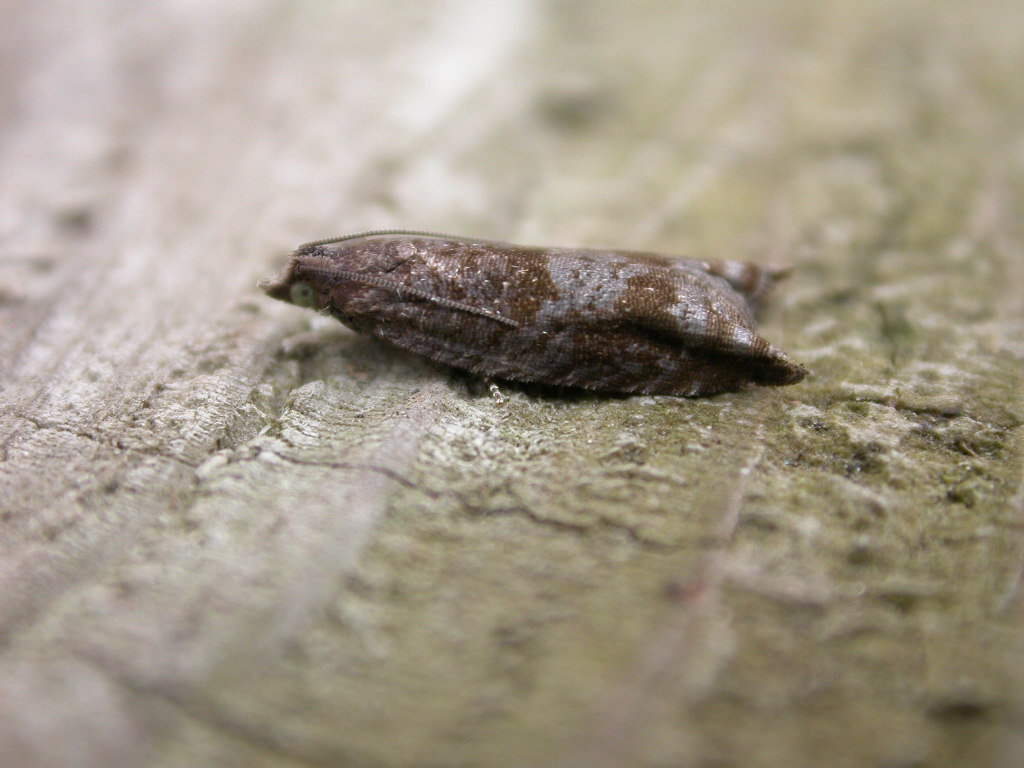
- Rhopobota naevana

Scientific classification
- Kingdom: Animalia
- Phylum: Arthropoda
- Clade: Pancrustacea
- Class: Insecta
- Order: Lepidoptera
- Family: Tortricidae
- Subfamily: Olethreutinae
- Tribe: Eucosmini
- Genus: Rhopobota; Lederer, 1859

Synonyms
- Erinaea Meyrick, 1907; Norma Heinrich, 1923; Kundrya Heinrich, 1923; Kundyra Razowski, 1977; Eumarissa Clarke, 1976

= Rhopobota =

Genus of tortrix moths

Rhopobota is a genus of moths belonging to the subfamily Olethreutinae of the family Tortricidae.

== Species ==
- Rhopobota amphigonia (Diakonoff, 1968)
- Rhopobota ancylimorpha Razowski, 2009
- Rhopobota ancyloides Kuznetzov, 1988
- Rhopobota antrifera (Meyrick, in Caradja & Meyrick, 1935)
- Rhopobota argyrophenga (Diakonoff, 1950)
- Rhopobota bicolor Kawabe, 1989
- Rhopobota blanditana (Kuznetzov, 1988)
- Rhopobota bostrichus Diakonoff, 1983
- Rhopobota bucera Zhang, Li & Wang, 2005
- Rhopobota cicatrix Razowski, 1999
- Rhopobota clivosa (Meyrick, 1912)
- Rhopobota cornuta Razowski, 1995
- Rhopobota dietziana (Kearfott, 1907)
- Rhopobota eclipticodes (Meyrick, in Caradja & Meyrick, 1935)
- Rhopobota falcata Nasu, 1999
- Rhopobota falcigera (Diakonoff, 1950)
- Rhopobota fanjingensis Zhang, Li & Wang, 2005
- Rhopobota finitimana (Heinrich, 1923)
- Rhopobota floccosa Zhang, Li & Wang, 2005
- Rhopobota furcata Zhang, Li & Wang, 2005
- Rhopobota grisona Razowski, 2013
- Rhopobota grypodes (Meyrick, 1912)
- Rhopobota hortaria (Meyrick, 1911)
- Rhopobota hypomelas Diakonoff, 1983
- Rhopobota ilexi Kuznetzov, 1969
- Rhopobota jonesiana Razowski, 2013
- Rhopobota kaempferiana (Oku, 1971)
- Rhopobota latipennis (Walsingham, 1900)
- Rhopobota latisocia Razowski, 2009
- Rhopobota leucognoma (Clarke, 1976)
- Rhopobota macroceria Razowski, 1999
- Rhopobota macrosepalana (Oku, 1971)
- Rhopobota metastena Diakonoff, 1984
- Rhopobota microceria Razowski, 1999
- Rhopobota mou Razowski, 2013
- Rhopobota multiplex (Meyrick, 1911)
- Rhopobota myrtillana (Humphreys & Westwood, 1845)
- Rhopobota nasea Razowski, 2013
- Rhopobota naevana (Hübner, [1814-1817])
- Rhopobota nova Razowski, 2009
- Rhopobota okui Nasu, 2000
- Rhopobota orbiculata Zhang, Li & Wang, 2005
- Rhopobota punctiferana Kuznetzov, 1988
- Rhopobota relicta (Kuznetzov, 1968)
- Rhopobota safidana (Razowski, 1963)
- Rhopobota scleropa (Meyrick, 1912)
- Rhopobota shikokuensis (Oku, 1971)
- Rhopobota stagnana ([Denis & Schiffermüller], 1775)
- Rhopobota svetlanae Kuznetzov, 2003
- Rhopobota symbolias (Meyrick, 1912)
- Rhopobota toshimai (Kawabe, 1978)
- Rhopobota unidens Razowski, 1999
- Rhopobota ustomaculana (Curtis, 1831)
- Rhopobota verditer (Hampson, 1891)
- Rhopobota visenda (Kuznetzov, 1973)

== See also ==
- List of Tortricidae genera
