= Rhopobota floccosa =

Scientific classification
- Domain: Eukaryota
- Kingdom: Animalia
- Phylum: Arthropoda
- Class: Insecta
- Order: Lepidoptera
- Family: Tortricidae
- Genus: Rhopobota
- Species: R. floccosa

Binomial name
- Rhopobota floccosa Zhang, Li & Wang, 2005

Synonyms
- Rhopobota floccoa

Species of moth

Rhopobota floccosa is a species of moth of the family Tortricidae. It is found in Hunan, China.

The wingspan is about 11 mm.
