= Rhopobota blanditana =

Scientific classification
- Domain: Eukaryota
- Kingdom: Animalia
- Phylum: Arthropoda
- Class: Insecta
- Order: Lepidoptera
- Family: Tortricidae
- Genus: Rhopobota
- Species: R. blanditana

Binomial name
- Rhopobota blanditana (Kuznetzov, 1988)

Synonyms
- Griselda blanditana Kuznetzov, 1988; Epinotia nielseni Kawabe, 1989

Species of moth

Rhopobota blanditana is a species of moth of the family Tortricidae. It is found in China (Sichuan, Guizhou), Vietnam and Thailand.
