= Rhopobota falcata =

Scientific classification
- Domain: Eukaryota
- Kingdom: Animalia
- Phylum: Arthropoda
- Class: Insecta
- Order: Lepidoptera
- Family: Tortricidae
- Genus: Rhopobota
- Species: R. falcata

Binomial name
- Rhopobota falcata Nasu, 1999

Species of moth

Rhopobota falcata is a species of moth of the family Tortricidae. It is found in China (Guangxi) and Japan.

The wingspan is 12-15.5 mm.
