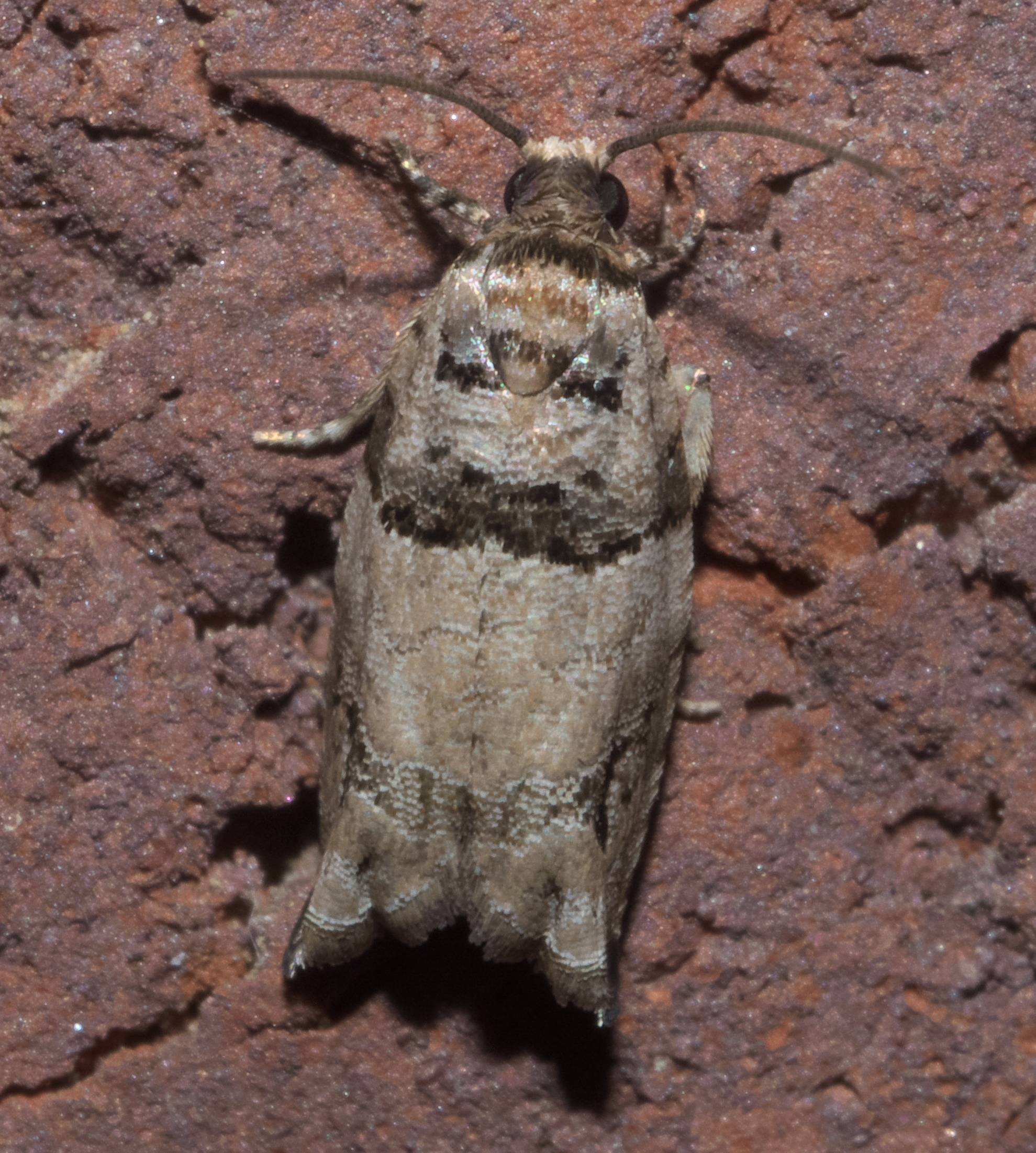

Scientific classification
- Kingdom: Animalia
- Phylum: Arthropoda
- Clade: Pancrustacea
- Class: Insecta
- Order: Lepidoptera
- Family: Tortricidae
- Genus: Rhopobota
- Species: R. dietziana

Binomial name
- Rhopobota dietziana (Kearfott, 1907)

= Rhopobota dietziana =

Species of moth

Rhopobota dietziana is a species of tortricid moth in the family Tortricidae.

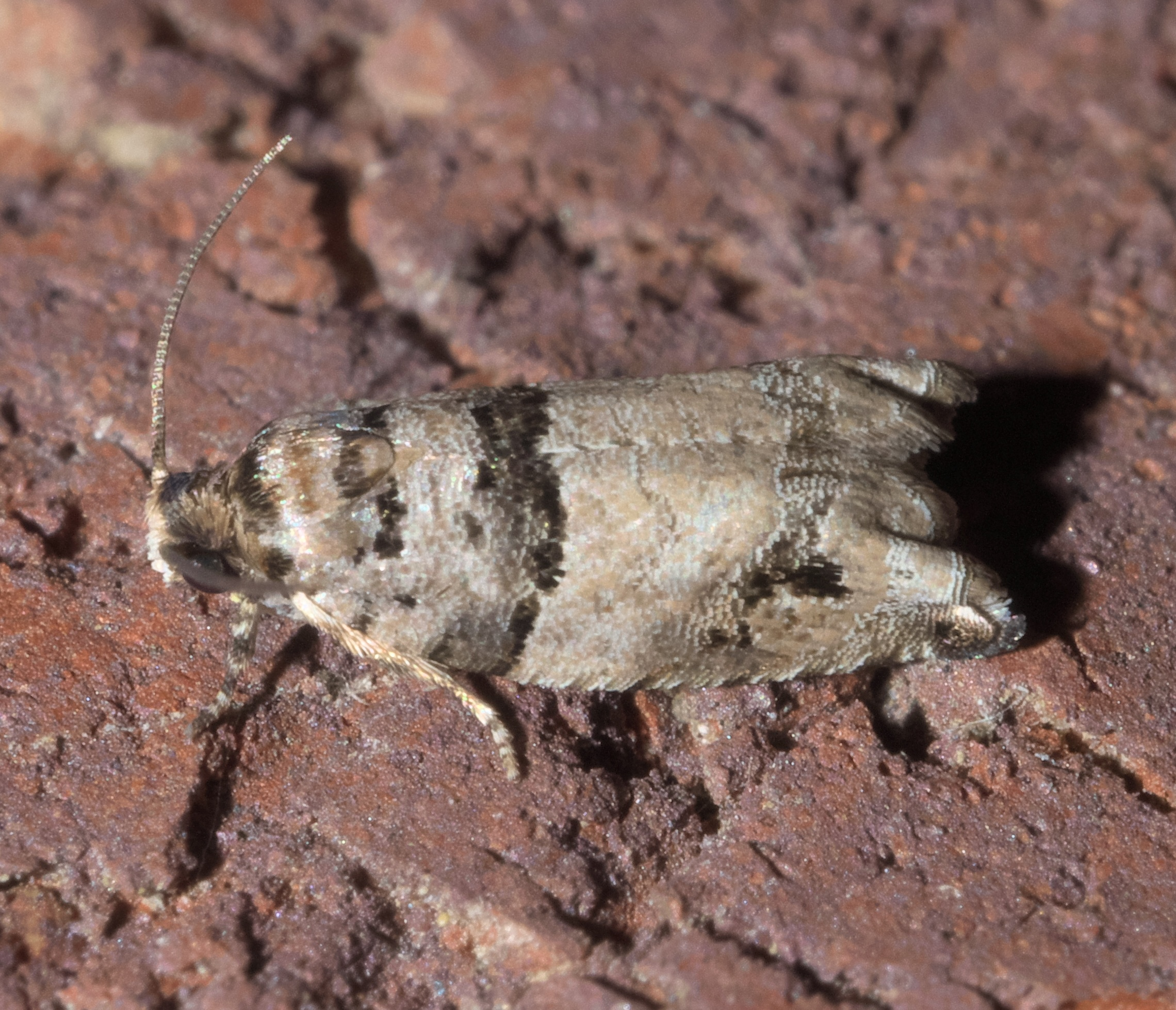
