= Rhopobota hortaria =

Scientific classification
- Kingdom: Animalia
- Phylum: Arthropoda
- Class: Insecta
- Order: Lepidoptera
- Family: Tortricidae
- Genus: Rhopobota
- Species: R. hortaria

Binomial name
- Rhopobota hortaria (Meyrick, 1911)

Synonyms
- Acroclita hortaria Meyrick, 1911; Acroclita philobrya Meyrick, 1920

Species of moth

Rhopobota hortaria is a species of moth of the family Tortricidae. It is found in New Caledonia and Australia, where it has been recorded from Victoria, New South Wales and Queensland.
