= Rhopobota orbiculata =

Scientific classification
- Domain: Eukaryota
- Kingdom: Animalia
- Phylum: Arthropoda
- Class: Insecta
- Order: Lepidoptera
- Family: Tortricidae
- Genus: Rhopobota
- Species: R. orbiculata

Binomial name
- Rhopobota orbiculata Zhang, Li & Wang, 2005

Species of moth

Rhopobota orbiculata is a species of moth of the family Tortricidae. It is found in Gansu, China.

The wingspan is 16–19 mm.
