= Rhopobota falcigera =

Scientific classification
- Domain: Eukaryota
- Kingdom: Animalia
- Phylum: Arthropoda
- Class: Insecta
- Order: Lepidoptera
- Family: Tortricidae
- Genus: Rhopobota
- Species: R. falcigera

Binomial name
- Rhopobota falcigera (Diakonoff, 1950)

Synonyms
- Acroclita falcigera Diakonoff, 1950

Species of moth

Rhopobota falcigera is a moth of the family Tortricidae first described by Alexey Diakonoff in 1950. It is found in Sri Lanka.
