= Rhopobota multiplex =

Scientific classification
- Kingdom: Animalia
- Phylum: Arthropoda
- Class: Insecta
- Order: Lepidoptera
- Family: Tortricidae
- Genus: Rhopobota
- Species: R. multiplex

Binomial name
- Rhopobota multiplex (Meyrick, 1912)

Synonyms
- Acroclita multiplex Meyrick, 1911

Species of moth

Rhopobota multiplex is a moth of the family Tortricidae first described by Edward Meyrick in 1912. It is found in Sri Lanka.
