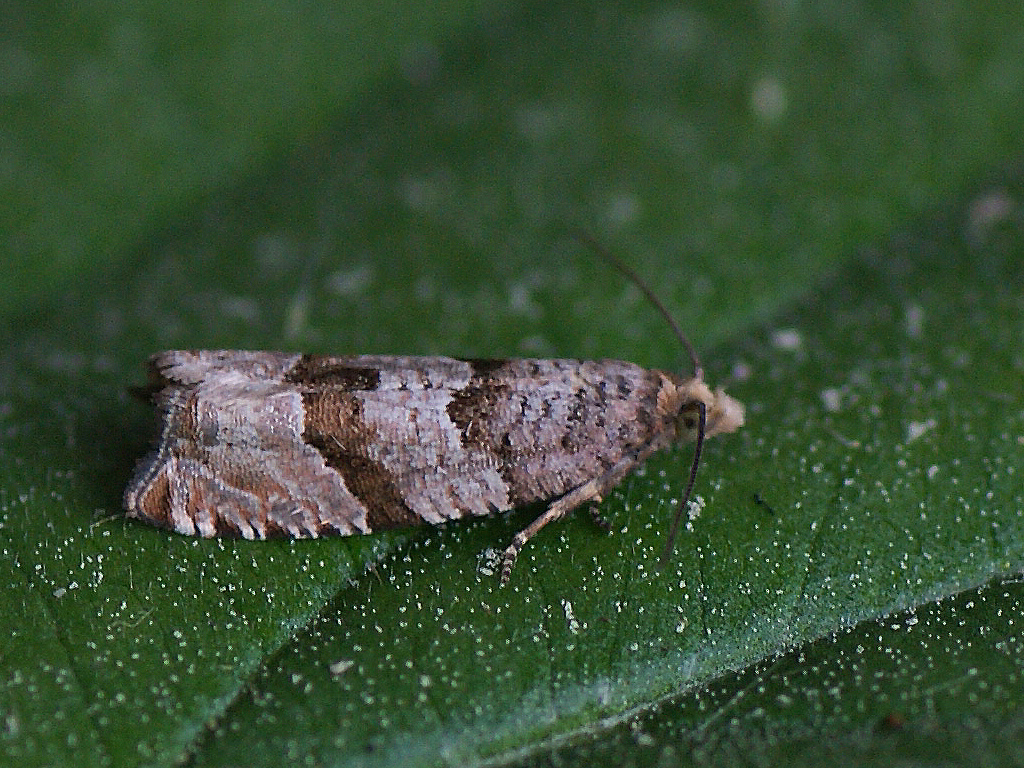

Scientific classification
- Kingdom: Animalia
- Phylum: Arthropoda
- Class: Insecta
- Order: Lepidoptera
- Family: Tortricidae
- Genus: Rhopobota
- Species: R. myrtillana

Binomial name
- Rhopobota myrtillana (Humphreys and Westwood, 1845)

Synonyms
- Sericoris myrtillana Humphreys and Westwood, 1845; Ephippiphora latifasciana Peyerimhoff, 1863; Grapholitha vacciniana Lienig & Zeller, 1846

= Rhopobota myrtillana =

Species of moth

Rhopobota myrtillana is a moth of the family Tortricidae. It is found on the British Isles, from northern and central Europe to Asia Minor and Siberia.

The wingspan is 19–21 mm.
