= Rhopobota latipennis =

Scientific classification
- Domain: Eukaryota
- Kingdom: Animalia
- Phylum: Arthropoda
- Class: Insecta
- Order: Lepidoptera
- Family: Tortricidae
- Genus: Rhopobota
- Species: R. latipennis

Binomial name
- Rhopobota latipennis (Walsingham, 1900)

Synonyms
- Ancylis latipennis Walsingham, 1900; Ancylis latipennis var. ussuriensis Caradja, 1916

Species of moth

Rhopobota latipennis is a species of moth of the family Tortricidae. It is found in China (Heilongjiang, Jiangxi, Henan, Sichuan), Japan and the Russian Far East.

The larvae feed on Padus racemosa.
