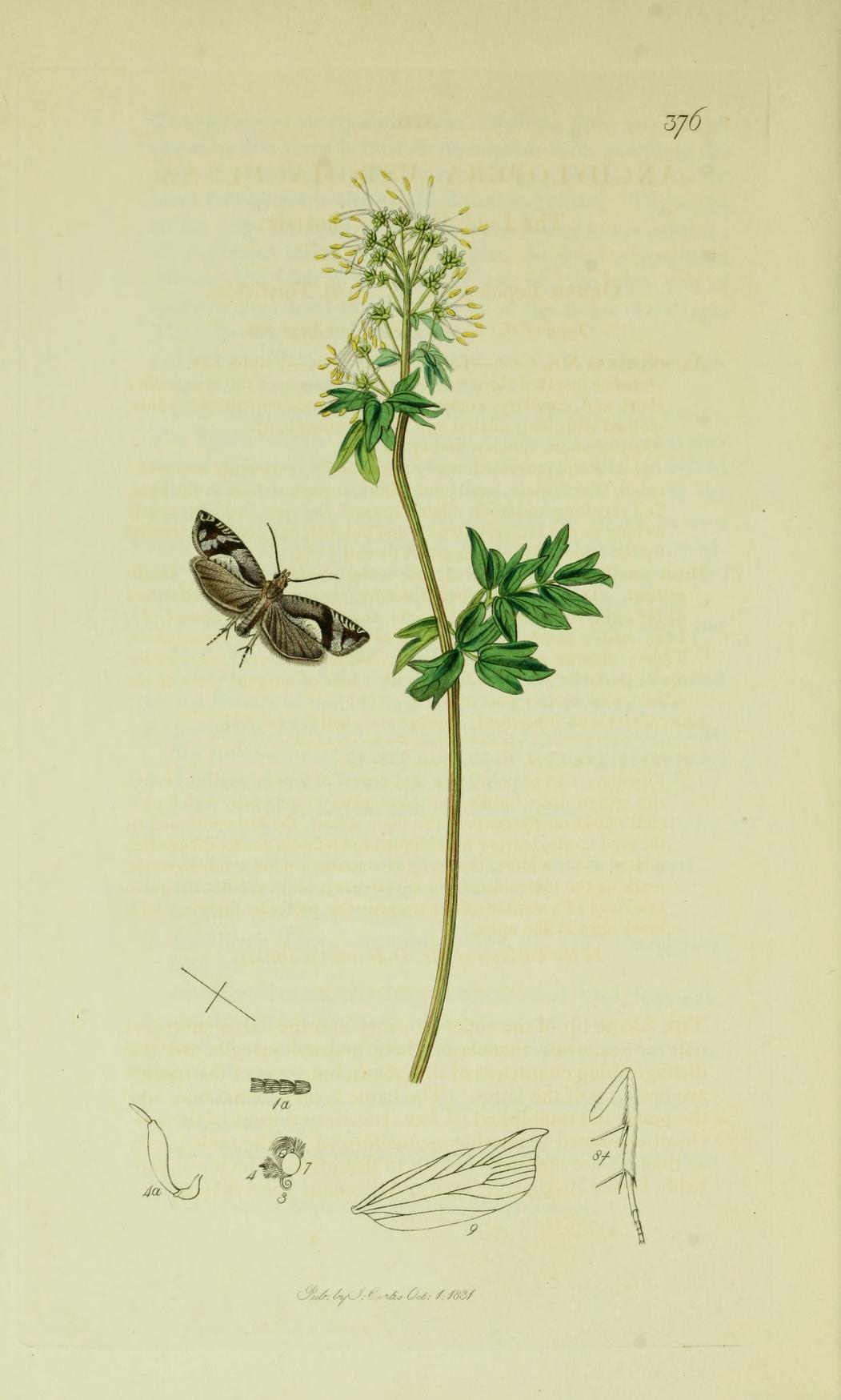
- Illustration from John Curtis's British Entomology Volume 6

Scientific classification
- Kingdom: Animalia
- Phylum: Arthropoda
- Class: Insecta
- Order: Lepidoptera
- Family: Tortricidae
- Genus: Rhopobota
- Species: R. ustomaculana

Binomial name
- Rhopobota ustomaculana (Curtis, 1831)

Synonyms
- Steganoptycha ustomaculana Curtis, 1831; Tortrix (Steganoptycha) dorsivittana Herrich-Schäffer, 1851; dorsivittana Herrich-Schaffer, 1847; Anchylopera ustomaculana; Rhopobota utumaculana Swatschek, 1958

= Rhopobota ustomaculana =

Species of moth

Rhopobota ustomaculana, the Loch Rannoch tortrix or Rannoch bell, is a moth of the family Tortricidae. It is found in most of Europe, east to the eastern part of the Palearctic realm, where it has been recorded from China (Anhui, Jiangxi, Hunan, Sichuan, Guizhou, and Tibet) and Japan.

The wingspan is about 13 mm. Adults are on wing from June to July. They fly during the afternoon and evening.

The larvae feed on Vaccinium vitis-idaea. They spin together the leaves of their host plant, feeding on the upper parenchyma. The species overwinters in this stage.
