= Rhopobota latisocia =

Scientific classification
- Domain: Eukaryota
- Kingdom: Animalia
- Phylum: Arthropoda
- Class: Insecta
- Order: Lepidoptera
- Family: Tortricidae
- Genus: Rhopobota
- Species: R. latisocia

Binomial name
- Rhopobota latisocia Razowski, 2009

Species of moth

Rhopobota latisocia is a moth of the family Tortricidae. It is found in Vietnam.

The wingspan is 12.5 mm.

== Etymology ==
The male refers to shape of the socius and is derived from Latin lata (meaning broad).
