= Rhopobota bicolor =

Scientific classification
- Kingdom: Animalia
- Phylum: Arthropoda
- Class: Insecta
- Order: Lepidoptera
- Family: Tortricidae
- Genus: Rhopobota
- Species: R. bicolor

Binomial name
- Rhopobota bicolor Kawabe, 1989

Species of moth

Rhopobota bicolor is a species of moth of the family Tortricidae. It is found in China (Hubei, Hunan, Sichuan, Guizhou), Taiwan, Japan and Thailand.
