= Rhopobota grisona =

Scientific classification
- Kingdom: Animalia
- Phylum: Arthropoda
- Class: Insecta
- Order: Lepidoptera
- Family: Tortricidae
- Genus: Rhopobota
- Species: R. grisona

Binomial name
- Rhopobota grisona Razowski, 2013

Species of moth

Rhopobota grisona is a species of moth of the family Tortricidae first described by Józef Razowski in 2013. It is found on Seram Island in Indonesia. The habitat consists of bamboo and secondary forests.

The wingspan is about 15 mm.
