= Rhopobota jonesiana =

Scientific classification
- Kingdom: Animalia
- Phylum: Arthropoda
- Class: Insecta
- Order: Lepidoptera
- Family: Tortricidae
- Genus: Rhopobota
- Species: R. jonesiana

Binomial name
- Rhopobota jonesiana Razowski, 2013

Species of moth

Rhopobota jonesiana is a species of moth of the family Tortricidae first described by Józef Razowski in 2013. It is found on Seram Island in Indonesia. The habitat consists of lower montane forests.

The wingspan is about 12 mm.

== Etymology ==
The species is named for David T. Jones, who collected the species.
