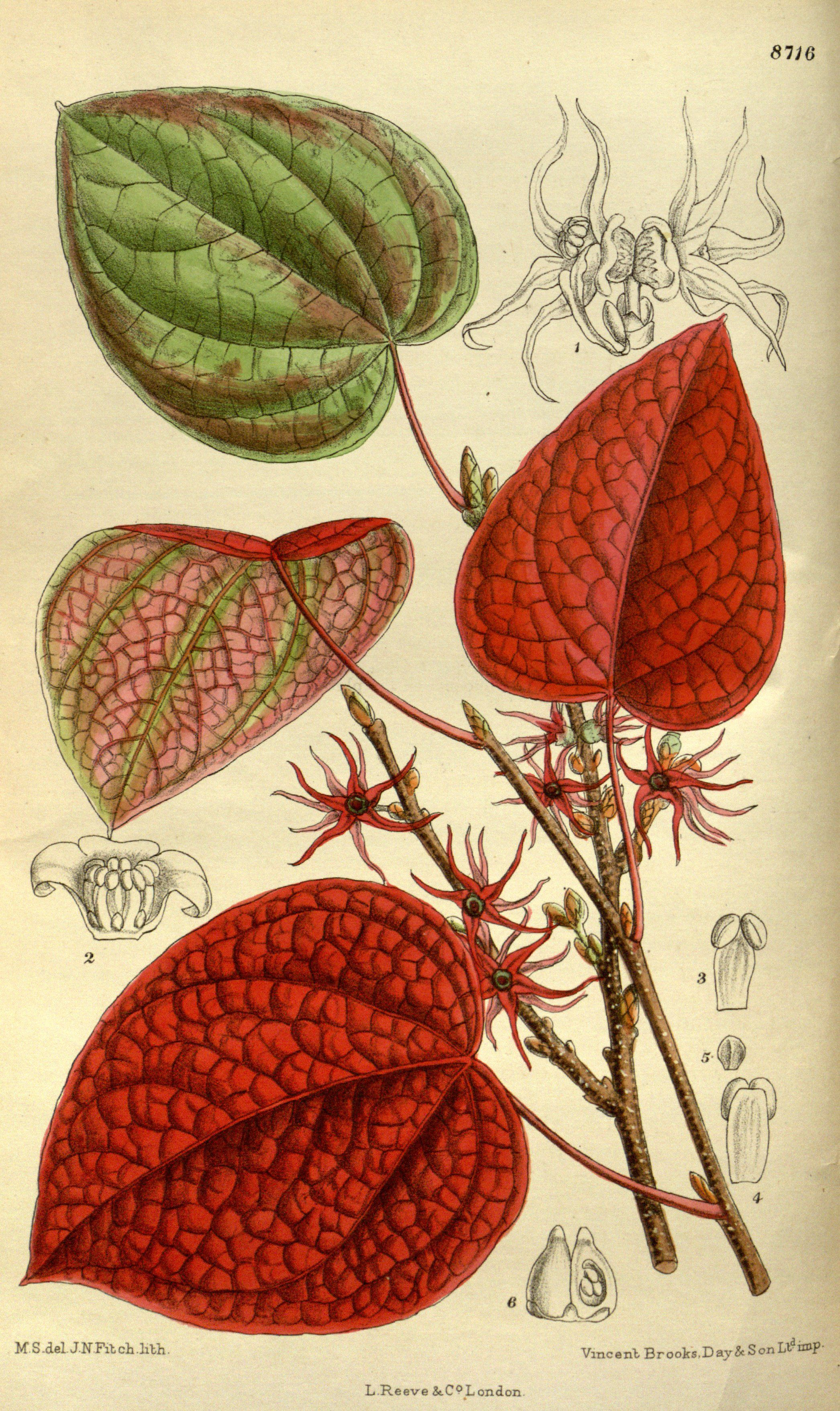
- D. cercidifolia (sic), Curtis's Botanical Magazine, 1917

Scientific classification
- Kingdom: Plantae
- Clade: Tracheophytes
- Clade: Angiosperms
- Clade: Eudicots
- Order: Saxifragales
- Family: Hamamelidaceae
- Genus: Disanthus
- Species: D. cercidifolius

Binomial name
- Disanthus cercidifolius Maxim.

= Disanthus cercidifolius =

Species of flowering plant

Disanthus cercidifolius is a species of flowering plant in the family Hamamelidaceae. It is native to woodland habitats in China and Japan.

== Nomenclature ==
The term Disanthus refers to the flowers that come in axillary pairs. The Latin specific epithet cercidifolius means "with leaves like the redbud tree (Cercis)". The epithet was originally spelled D. cercidifolia. The International Code of Nomenclature for algae, fungi, and plants stipulates that the Latin grammatical gender is masculine, and so the spelling is D. cercidifolius.

== Description ==
Disanthus cercidifolius is a medium-sized deciduous shrub growing to 3 m (10 ft) tall and wide. It is noted for its heart-shaped leaves which turn to shades of red, purple and yellow in autumn.

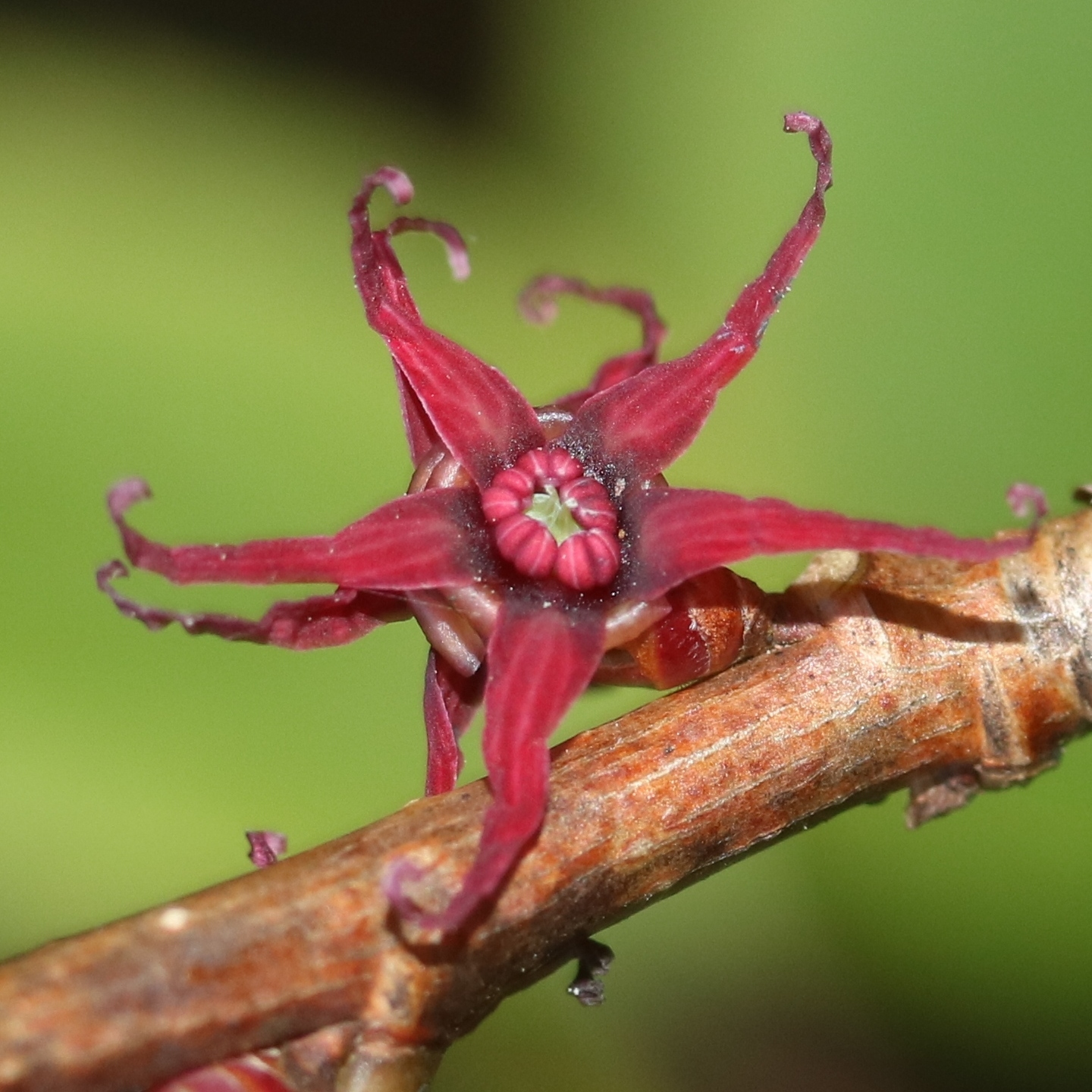
2 flowers

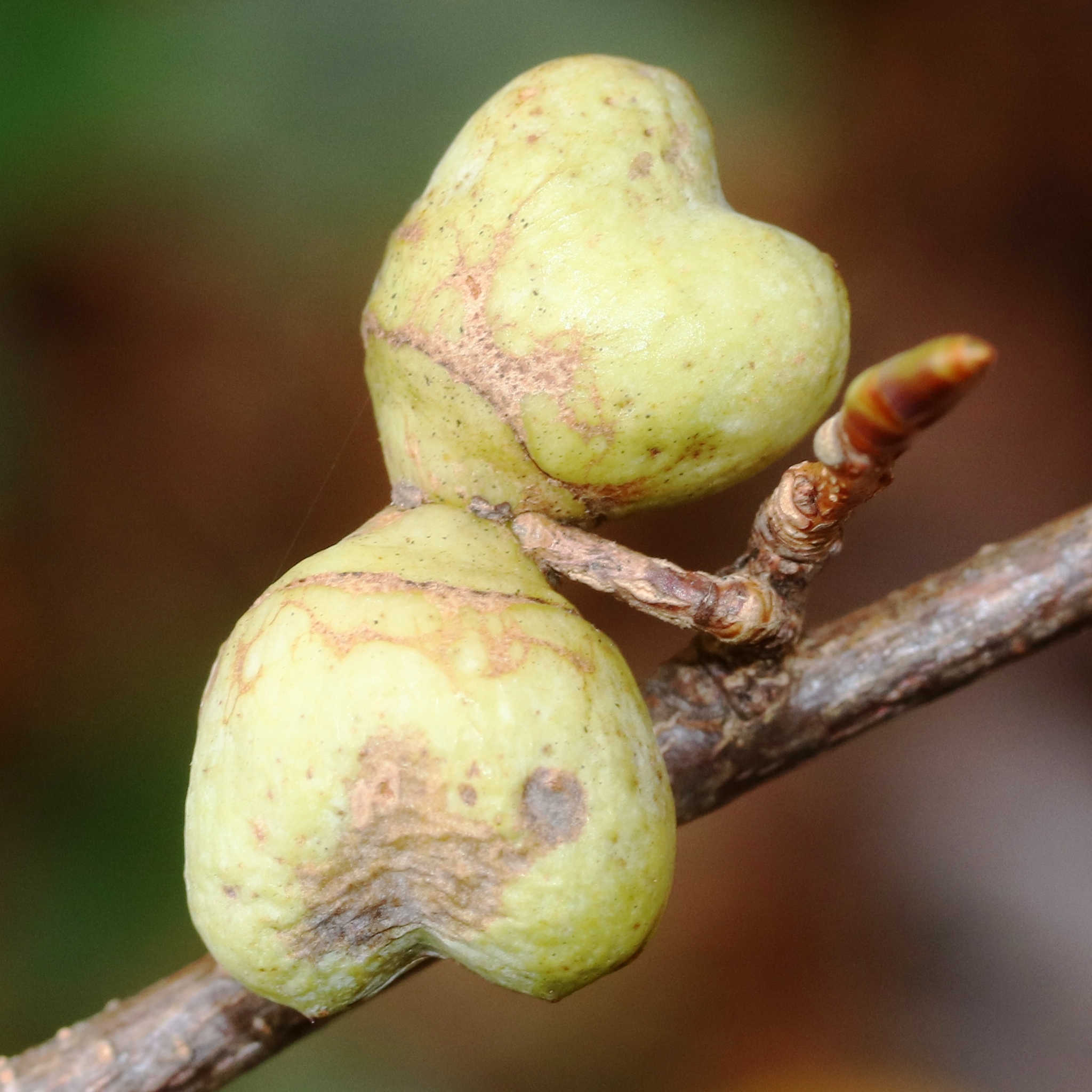
2 fruits

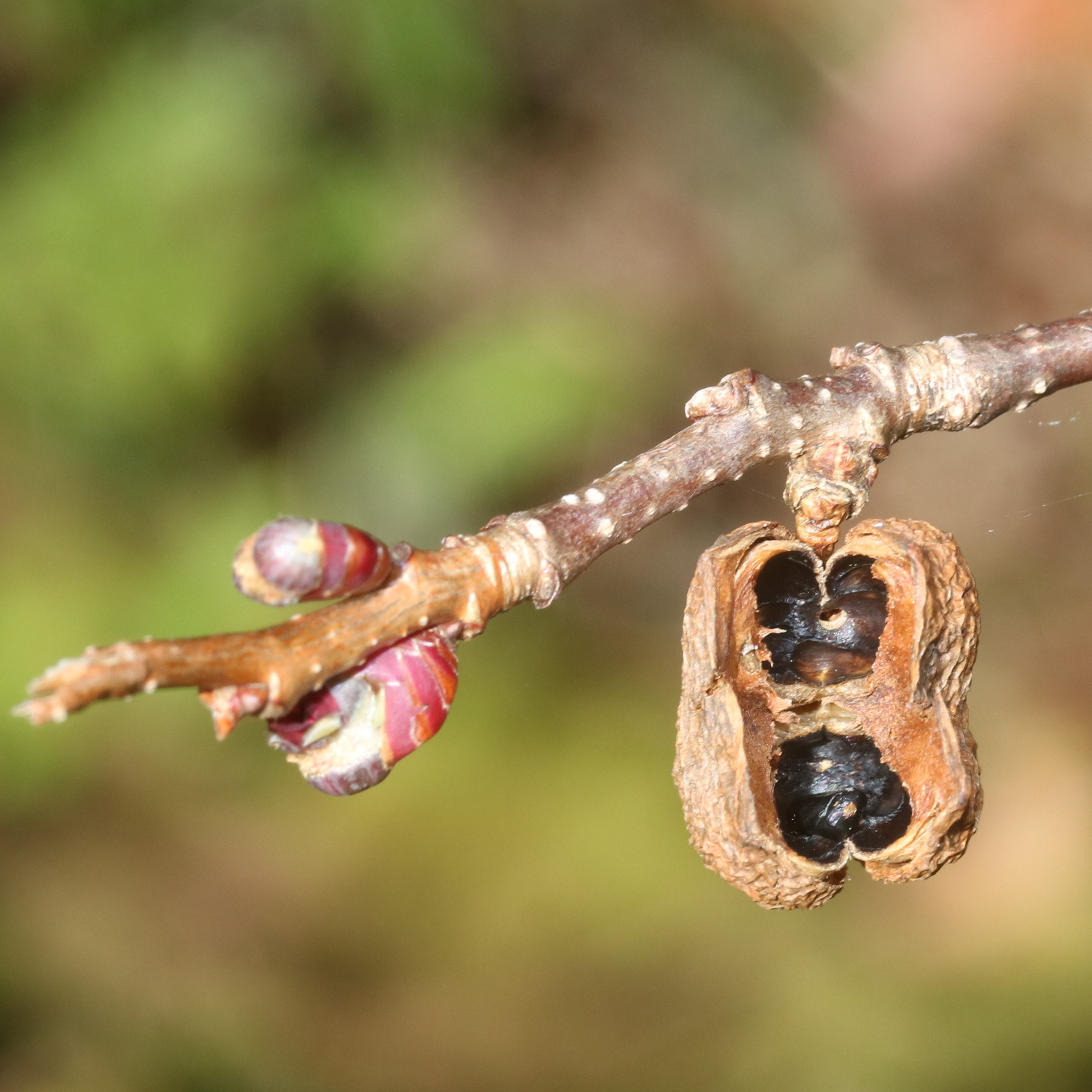
fruit without seeds

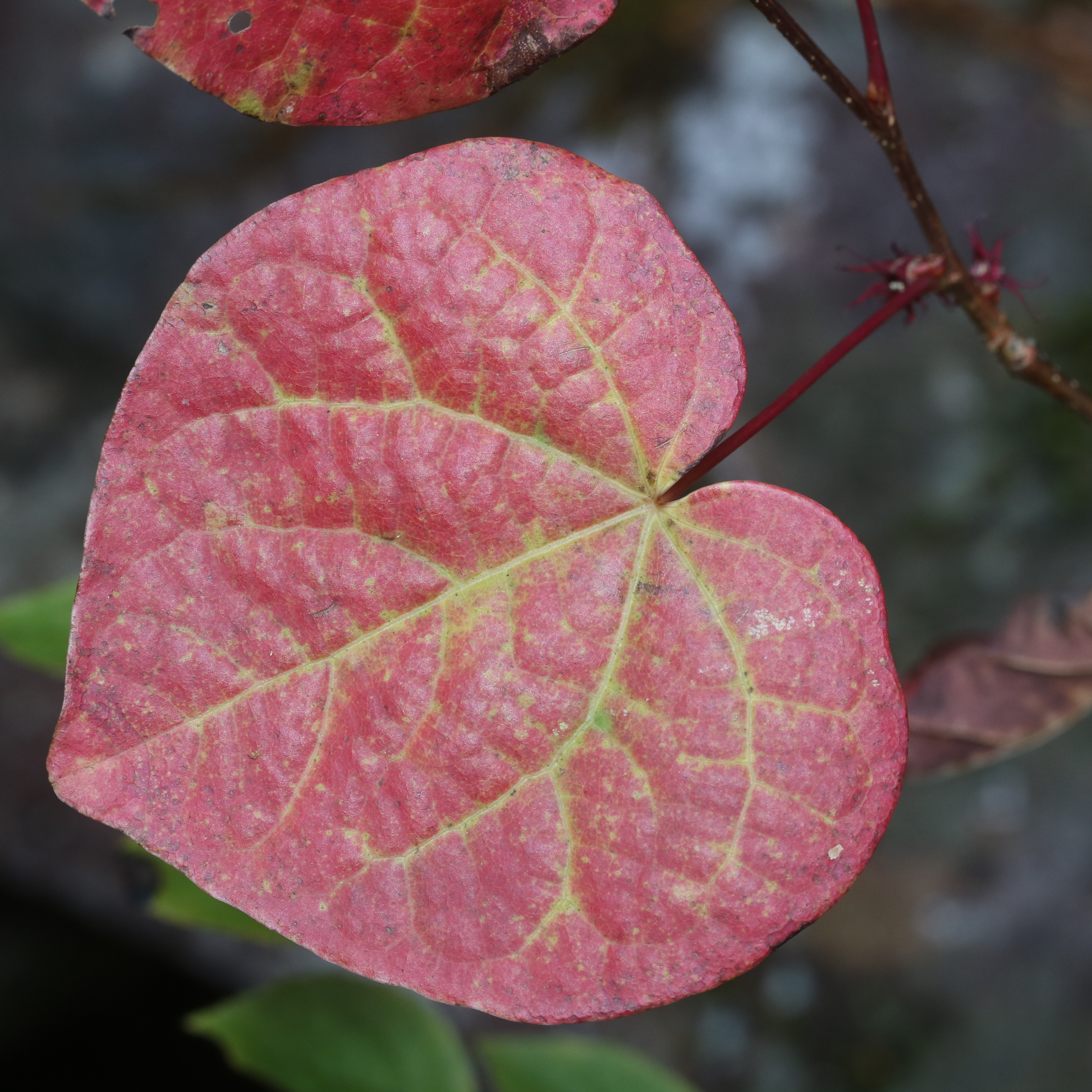
leaf

Varieties

- Disanthus cercidifolius var. longipes — endemic to China.

== Cultivation ==
Disanthus cercidifolius is cultivated as an ornamental plant. It is a calcifuge, requiring a lime-free soil.

The plant has gained the Royal Horticultural Society's Award of Garden Merit.

'Ena Nishiki' is a variegated cultivar with white and green foliage while 'Golden Crown' is a white and yellow variegated cultivar.
