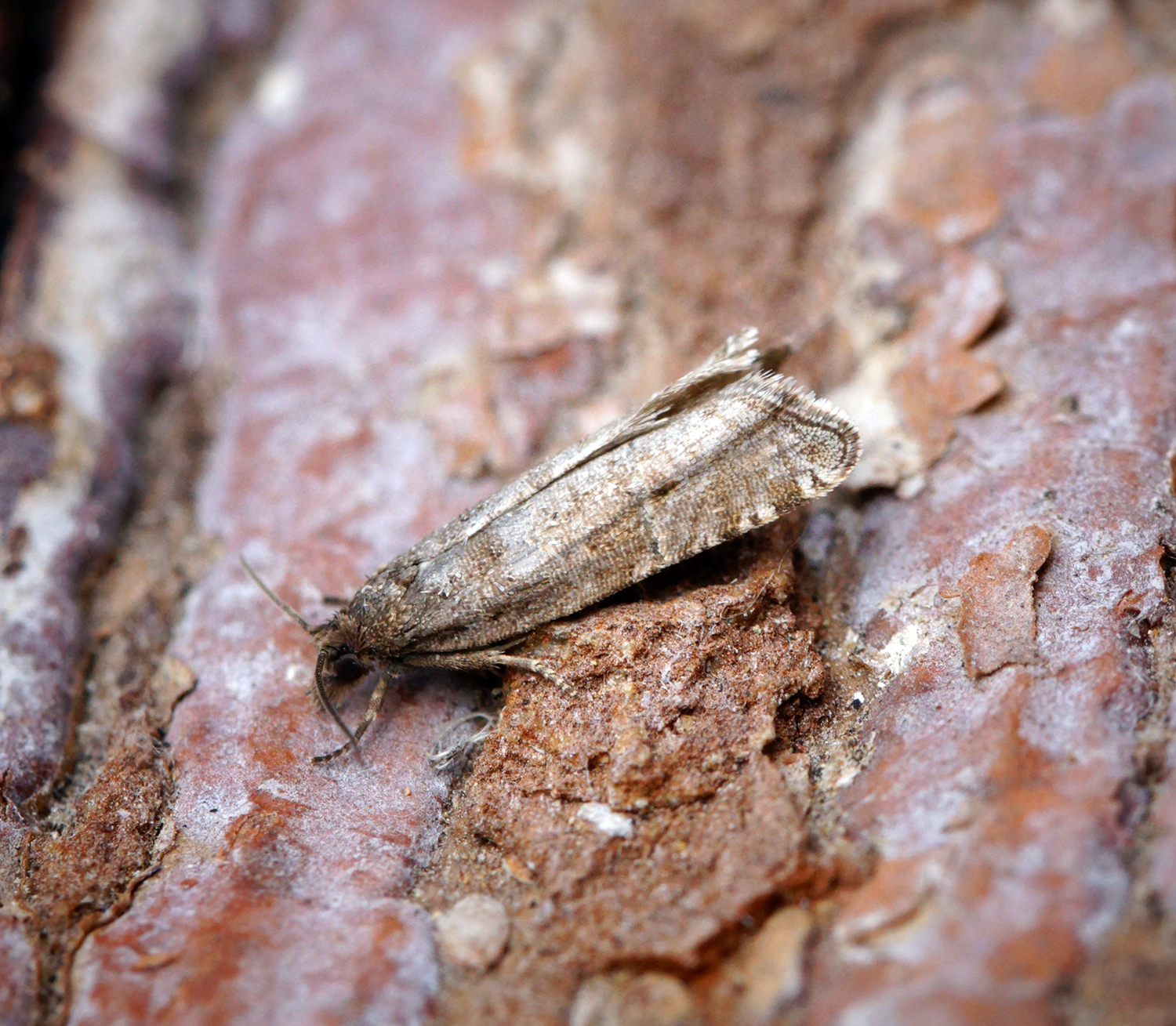

Scientific classification
- Domain: Eukaryota
- Kingdom: Animalia
- Phylum: Arthropoda
- Class: Insecta
- Order: Lepidoptera
- Family: Tortricidae
- Genus: Rhopobota
- Species: R. stagnana

Binomial name
- Rhopobota stagnana (Denis & Schiffermüller, 1775)

= Rhopobota stagnana =

Species of moth

Rhopobota stagnana is a moth belonging to the family Tortricidae. The species was first described by Michael Denis and Ignaz Schiffermüller in 1775.

== Distribution ==
It is native to the Palearctic including Europe.

== Anatomy ==
The wingspan is 12-18 millimeters. The forewings have small white cross-spots along the costal edge, the basal part is slightly darker brown, and there is one evenly wide, brown, slanted cross-band slightly outside the middle. The hindwings are pale brown.

== Lifespan ==
This species has two generations each year, flying respectively from April to June and in August-September. The larvae feed on Succisa pratensis, the first generation of larvae on the leaf rosettes and the second generation on the flower heads.
