= Rhopobota fanjingensis =

Scientific classification
- Domain: Eukaryota
- Kingdom: Animalia
- Phylum: Arthropoda
- Class: Insecta
- Order: Lepidoptera
- Family: Tortricidae
- Genus: Rhopobota
- Species: R. fanjingensis

Binomial name
- Rhopobota fanjingensis Zhang, Li & Wang, 2005

Species of moth

Rhopobota fanjingensis is a species of moth of the family Tortricidae. It is found in Guizhou, China.

The wingspan is about 14.5 mm.

== Etymology ==
The species name refers to Mount Fanjing, the type locality.
