= Rhopobota visenda =

Scientific classification
- Domain: Eukaryota
- Kingdom: Animalia
- Phylum: Arthropoda
- Class: Insecta
- Order: Lepidoptera
- Family: Tortricidae
- Genus: Rhopobota
- Species: R. visenda

Binomial name
- Rhopobota visenda (Kuznetsov, 1973)

Synonyms
- Griselda visenda Kuznetsov, 1973

Species of moth

Rhopobota visenda is a species of moth of the family Tortricidae. It is found in Shaanxi, China.
