= Rhopobota eclipticodes =

Scientific classification
- Kingdom: Animalia
- Phylum: Arthropoda
- Class: Insecta
- Order: Lepidoptera
- Family: Tortricidae
- Genus: Rhopobota
- Species: R. eclipticodes

Binomial name
- Rhopobota eclipticodes (Meyrick, 1935)

Synonyms
- Acroclita eclipticodes Meyrick, 1935; Erinaea eclipticodes

Species of moth

Rhopobota eclipticodes is a species of moth of the family Tortricidae. It is found in China (Zhejiang, Hubei, Guizhou).

The wingspan is 12–14 mm.
