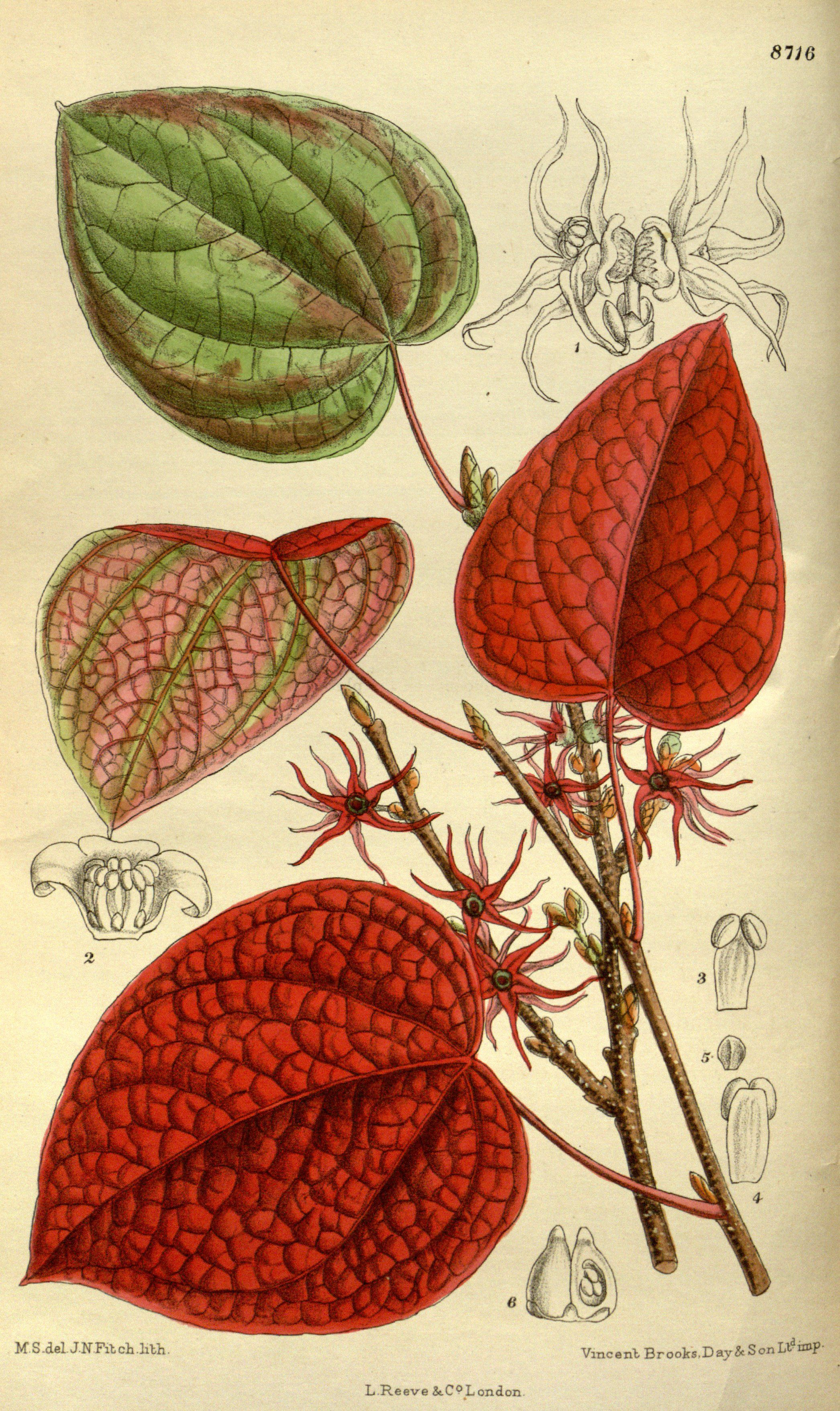
- Disanthus cercidifolia (sic), Curtis's Botanical Magazine, 1917

Scientific classification
- Kingdom: Plantae
- Clade: Tracheophytes
- Clade: Angiosperms
- Clade: Eudicots
- Order: Saxifragales
- Family: Hamamelidaceae
- Subfamily: Disanthoideae; Harms
- Genus: Disanthus; Maxim.

Species
- Disanthus cercidifolius Maxim.; Disanthus ovatifolius Aver., P.K.Endress, B.H.Quang & K.S.Nguyen

= Disanthus =

Genus of flowering plants

Disanthus is a genus containing two species of flowering plants in the family Hamamelidaceae. The type species, Disanthus cercidifolius, was the only known species until 2017, when a second species, Disanthus ovatifolius was described.

Disanthus cercidifolius is native to woodland habitats in China and Japan while D. ovatifolius is found in northern Vietnam.

== Nomenclature ==
The type species epithet was originally spelled D. cercidifolia. The International Code of Nomenclature for algae, fungi, and plants stipulates that the Latin grammatical gender is masculine, and so the spelling is D. cercidifolius. Disanthus ovatifolius was first introduced to horticulture in Europe under the invalid name Uocodendron whartonii, honoring the late Peter Wharton, formerly curator of the David C. Lam Asian Garden at UBC Botanical Garden in Vancouver. After scientific study, the new species was assigned to Disanthus.
