= Rhopobota ancylimorpha =

Scientific classification
- Domain: Eukaryota
- Kingdom: Animalia
- Phylum: Arthropoda
- Class: Insecta
- Order: Lepidoptera
- Family: Tortricidae
- Genus: Rhopobota
- Species: R. ancylimorpha

Binomial name
- Rhopobota ancylimorpha Razowski, 2009

Species of moth

Rhopobota ancylimorpha is a moth of the family Tortricidae. It is found in Vietnam.

The wingspan is 19 mm.
