= Calcifuge =

Plant that does not tolerate alkaline soil

A calcifuge is a plant that does not tolerate alkaline (basic) soil. The word is derived from the Latin 'to flee from chalk'. These plants are also described as ericaceous, as the prototypical calcifuge is the genus Erica (heaths). It is not the presence of carbonate or hydroxide ions per se that these plants cannot tolerate, but the fact that under alkaline conditions, iron becomes less soluble. Consequently, calcifuges grown on alkaline soils often develop the symptoms of iron deficiency, i.e. interveinal chlorosis of new growth. There are many horticultural plants which are calcifuges, most of which require an 'ericaceous' compost with a low pH, composed principally of Sphagnum moss peat. Alternatively sulphur chips may be used to lower soil pH.

A plant that thrives in lime-rich soils is known as a calcicole.

== Examples ==
=== Order Ericales ===
==== Ericaceae ====
- Andromeda polifolia
- Calluna (common heather)
- Cassiope lycopodioides
- Daboecia
- Enkianthus campanulatus
- Erica (but not E. carnea or E. erigena)
- Gaultheria mucronata
- Kalmia latifolia (calico bush)
- Pieris
- Rhododendron (many species of rhododendron and azalea)
- Vaccinium corymbosum (northern highbush blueberry)
- Vaccinium myrtillus (bilberry)

==== Sarraceniaceae (carnivorous) ====
- Pitcher plants of the genera Sarracenia, Darlingtonia, and Heliamphora

==== Styracaceae ====
- Styrax wilsonii

==== Theaceae ====
- Camellia sinensis (Tea plant)

=== Order Caryophyllales ===
==== Droseraceae (carnivorous) ====
- Drosera (sundew species; but some species are calcitolerant or calciphilous)
- Dionaea muscipula (Venus flytrap)

==== Nepenthaceae (carnivorous) ====
- Nepenthes (pitcher plants; but some species are calcitolerant or even calciphilous)

=== Order Lamiales ===
==== Lentibulariaceae (carnivorous) ====
- Utricularia sect. Calpidisca and some other subgenera (non-epiphytic terrestrial bladderworts; there are some species that prefer neutral pH or are calciphilous)

=== Other orders ===
==== Asteraceae ====
- Arnica montana

==== Columelliaceae ====
- Desfontainia spinosa

==== Cornaceae ====
- Cornus florida (dogwood)

==== Elaeocarpaceae ====
- Crinodendron hookerianum

==== Fagaceae ====
- Quercus (Some species of oak)

==== Gentianaceae ====
- Gentiana acaulis
- Gentiana sino-ornata

==== Hamamelidaceae ====
- Corylopsis pauciflora
- Disanthus cercidifolius
- Fothergilla major
- Hamamelis vernalis (spring witch hazel)

==== Papaveraceae ====
- Meconopsis grandis (Himalayan blue poppy)

==== Poaceae ====
- Avena sativa (oat)

==== Proteaceae ====
- Embothrium coccineum
- Grevillea rosmarinifolia

==== Schisandraceae ====
- Illicium anisatum
