= Rhopobota toshimai =

Scientific classification
- Kingdom: Animalia
- Phylum: Arthropoda
- Class: Insecta
- Order: Lepidoptera
- Family: Tortricidae
- Genus: Rhopobota
- Species: R. toshimai

Binomial name
- Rhopobota toshimai (Kawabe, 1978)

Synonyms
- Griselda toshimai Kawabe, 1978; Epinotia toshimai

Species of moth

Rhopobota toshimai is a species of moth of the family Tortricidae. It is found in Taiwan and Japan.

The wingspan is 13–17 mm.
