= Rhopobota mou =

Scientific classification
- Kingdom: Animalia
- Phylum: Arthropoda
- Class: Insecta
- Order: Lepidoptera
- Family: Tortricidae
- Genus: Rhopobota
- Species: R. mou

Binomial name
- Rhopobota mou Razowski, 2013

Species of moth

Rhopobota mou is a species of moth of the family Tortricidae. It is found in New Caledonia, in the southwest Pacific Ocean.

The wingspan is about 17 mm.
