= Rhopobota antrifera =

Scientific classification
- Kingdom: Animalia
- Phylum: Arthropoda
- Class: Insecta
- Order: Lepidoptera
- Family: Tortricidae
- Genus: Rhopobota
- Species: R. antrifera

Binomial name
- Rhopobota antrifera (Meyrick, in Caradja & Meyrick, 1935)

Synonyms
- Eucosma antrifera Meyrick, 1935

Species of moth

Rhopobota antrifera is a species of moth of the family Tortricidae. It is found in China (Zhejiang, Fujian, Hubei, Guangxi, Guizhou) and Russia.
