= Rhopobota okui =

Scientific classification
- Domain: Eukaryota
- Kingdom: Animalia
- Phylum: Arthropoda
- Class: Insecta
- Order: Lepidoptera
- Family: Tortricidae
- Genus: Rhopobota
- Species: R. okui

Binomial name
- Rhopobota okui Nasu, 2000

Species of moth

Rhopobota okui is a species of moth of the family Tortricidae. It is found in China (Henan, Guangdong, Sichuan, Guizhou) and Japan.
