= Rhopobota bucera =

Scientific classification
- Domain: Eukaryota
- Kingdom: Animalia
- Phylum: Arthropoda
- Class: Insecta
- Order: Lepidoptera
- Family: Tortricidae
- Genus: Rhopobota
- Species: R. bucera

Binomial name
- Rhopobota bucera Zhang, Li & Wang, 2005

Species of moth

Rhopobota bucera is a species of moth of the family Tortricidae. It is found in Shaanxi, China.

The wingspan is about 12.5 mm.
