= Rhopobota nova =

Scientific classification
- Domain: Eukaryota
- Kingdom: Animalia
- Phylum: Arthropoda
- Class: Insecta
- Order: Lepidoptera
- Family: Tortricidae
- Genus: Rhopobota
- Species: R. nova

Binomial name
- Rhopobota nova Razowski, 2009

Species of moth

Rhopobota nova is a moth of the family Tortricidae. It is found in Vietnam.

The wingspan is 18 mm.
