= Rhopobota symbolias =

Scientific classification
- Kingdom: Animalia
- Phylum: Arthropoda
- Class: Insecta
- Order: Lepidoptera
- Family: Tortricidae
- Genus: Rhopobota
- Species: R. symbolias

Binomial name
- Rhopobota symbolias (Meyrick, 1912)

Synonyms
- Acroclita symbolias Meyrick, 1912; Eumarissa symbolias

Species of moth

Rhopobota symbolias is a species of moth of the family Tortricidae. It is found in China (Hubei, Hunan, Guangxi, Guizhou) and India.
