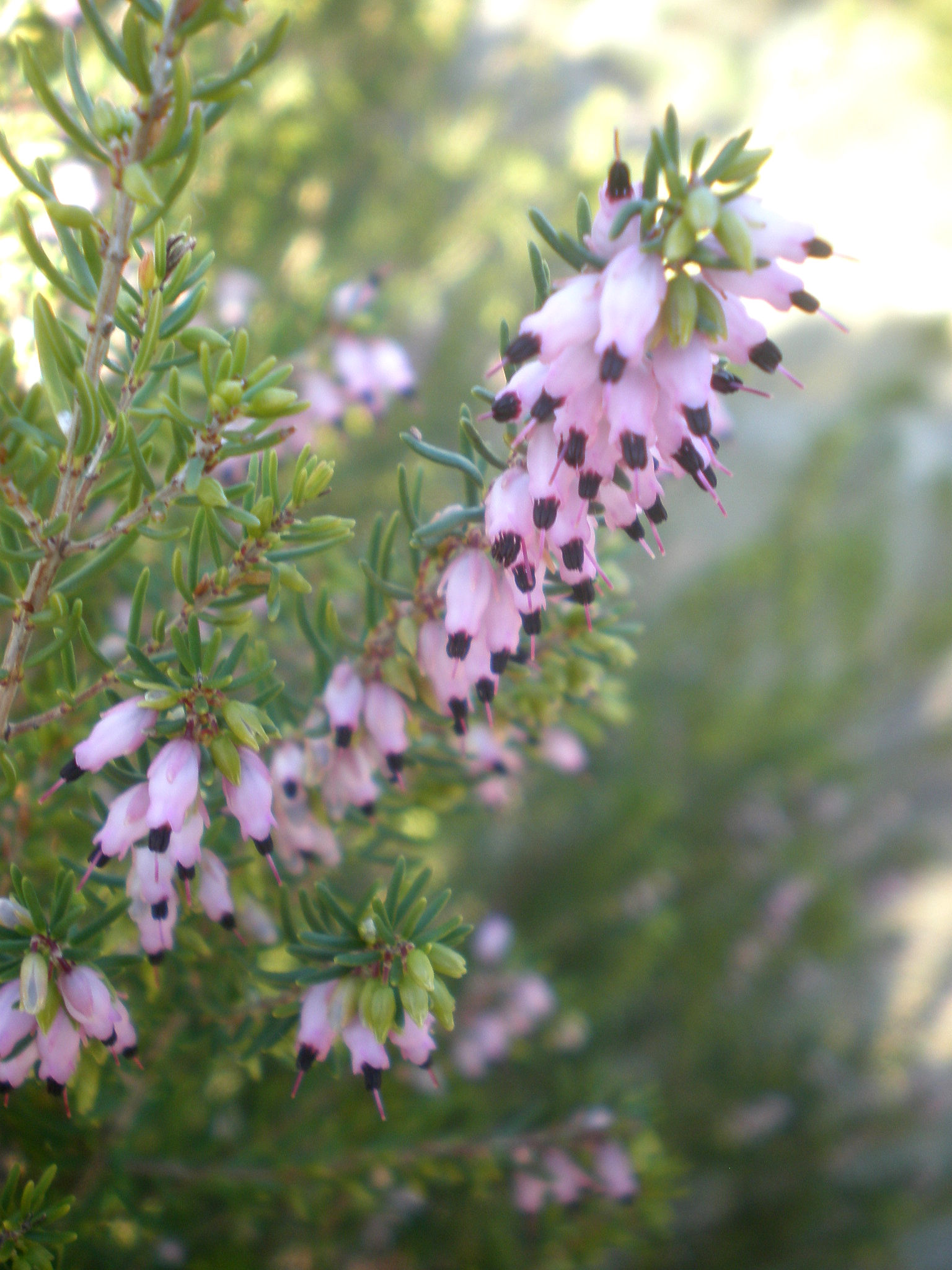

Scientific classification
- Kingdom: Plantae
- Clade: Tracheophytes
- Clade: Angiosperms
- Clade: Eudicots
- Clade: Asterids
- Order: Ericales
- Family: Ericaceae
- Genus: Erica
- Species: E. erigena

Binomial name
- Erica erigena R.Ross

= Erica erigena =

Species of flowering plant

Erica erigena, the Irish heath, is a European species of flowering plant in the family Ericaceae.

== Description ==
It is a compact evergreen shrub growing to 75 centimetres (30 inches), with somewhat brittle foliage and deep pink honey-scented flowers in winter and spring. The leaves are 4-whorled, measuring 5–8 millimetres (1/4–3/8 in) in length and turning dark green at maturity.

Originally known as Erica mediterranea, the species was renamed in 1969 by R. Ross. The species name erigena comes from Erin of Ireland as "one applicable to something of Irish origin". E. mediterranea is now more commonly used to refer to E. carnea.

== Distribution and habitat ==
It is native to Ireland, southwestern France, Spain, Portugal and Tangier. Its appearance in the far west of Ireland, separated from the main Mediterranean populations, suggests a garden escape. It prefers cliffs and heathland.

== Cultivation ==
In cultivation, it is often seen as groundcover amongst dwarf conifers. Like others of its kind, it is a calcifuge, preferring an open sunny site with well-drained acid soil. Numerous cultivars have been developed for garden use, of which the following have gained the Royal Horticultural Society's Award of Garden Merit:

- Erica erigena 'Irish Dusk'
- Erica erigena f. alba 'W.T. Rackliff' (white-flowered)
