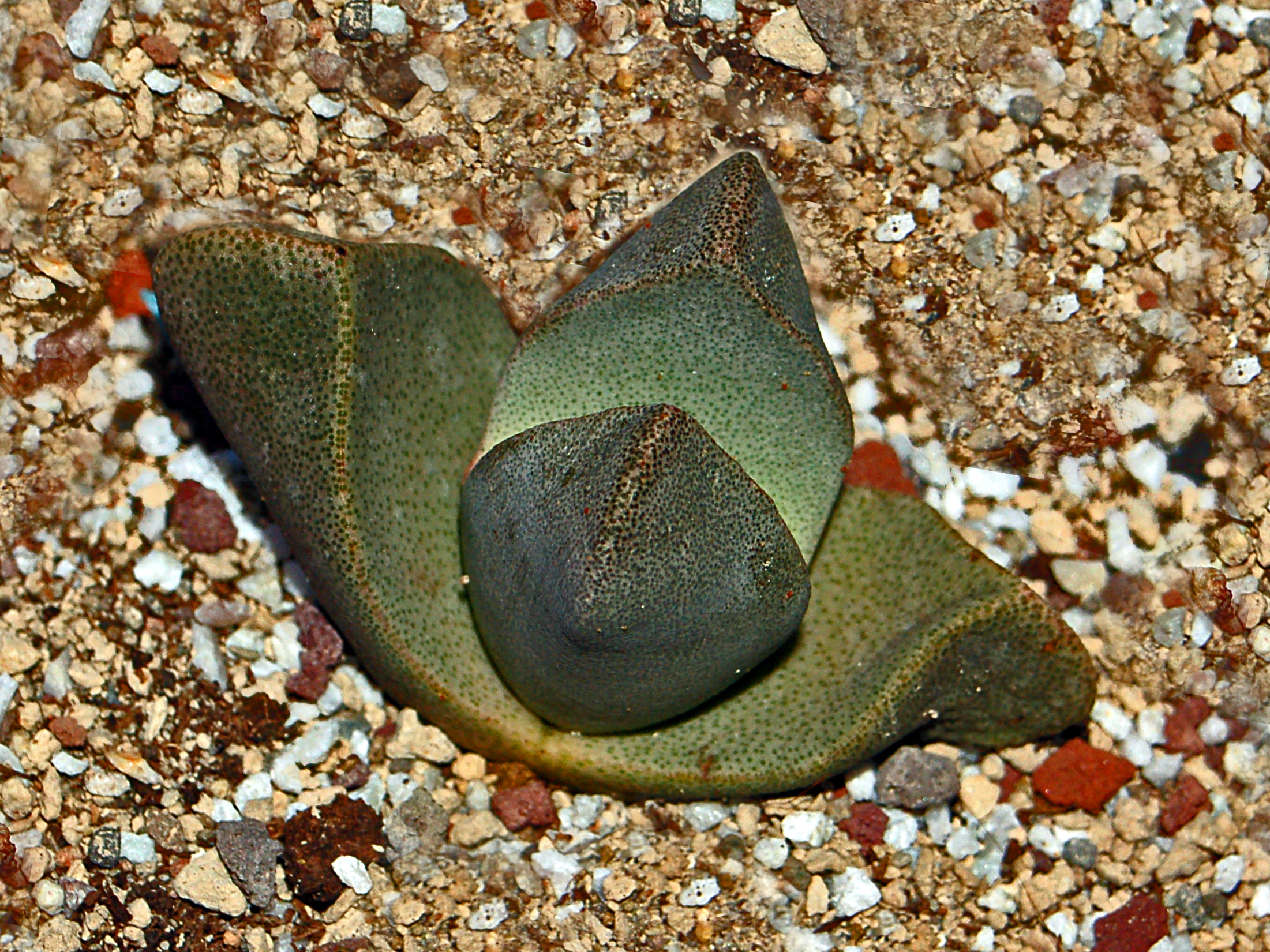
- Orto Botanico dell'Università di Genova

Scientific classification
- Kingdom: Plantae
- Clade: Tracheophytes
- Clade: Angiosperms
- Clade: Eudicots
- Order: Caryophyllales
- Family: Aizoaceae
- Genus: Pleiospilos
- Species: P. bolusii

Binomial name
- Pleiospilos bolusii (Hook.f.) N.E.Br.

Synonyms
- Mesembryanthemum bolusii Hook.f. basionym; Pleiospilos beaufortensis L.Bolus (1939); Pleiospilos barbarae Karrer

= Pleiospilos bolusii =

Species of succulent

Pleiospilos bolusii, the mimicry plant, is a species of flowering plant in the family Aizoaceae, native to the Eastern Cape province of South Africa, where it grows at an elevation of 750–1,100 m (2,461–3,609 ft). The species epithet bolusii honours Harry Bolus, a 19th-century South African botanist.

It is a small, stemless succulent perennial growing to 8 cm (3 in) tall by 15 cm (6 in) wide, with two or four opposite grey-green leaves, quite thick, fused at the base, almost triangular, with entire margins. The leaves are longer and more angular than those of the closely related P. nelii, but in both cases the shape and texture of the leaves resemble a pile of split pebbles, possibly to deter predators. The yellow, many-petaled, daisy-like flowers emerge from the center of the leaves, and are 6–8 cm (2–3 in) in diameter - large in relation to the overall size of the plant. The flowers are often coconut-scented. The flowering period extends from August to September.

The plant is one of several species cultivated for their rocklike appearance, which are sometimes collectively called mesembs. With a minimum temperature of 7 °C (45 °F), in temperate regions it is grown under glass. It has gained the Royal Horticultural Society's Award of Garden Merit.

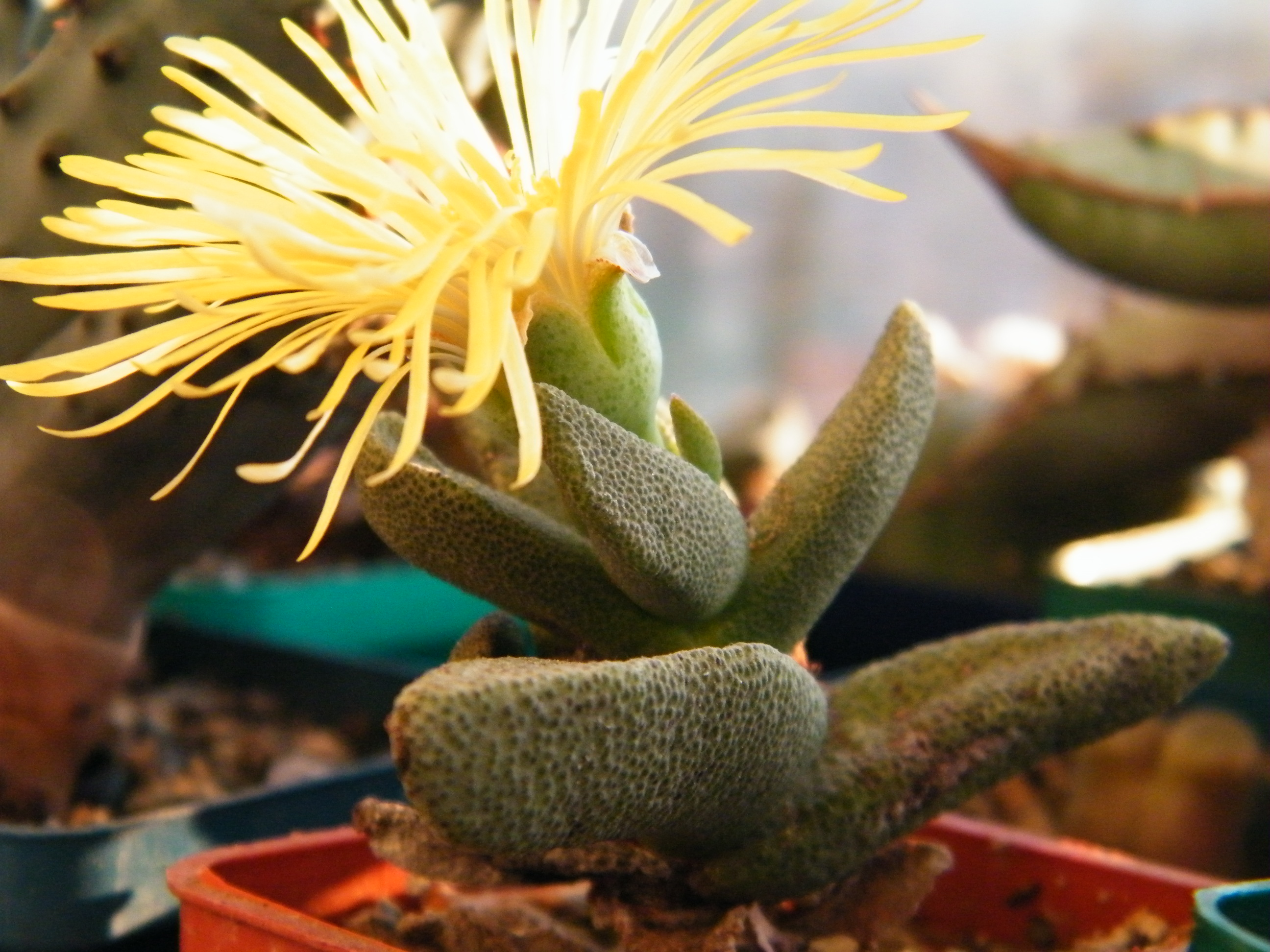

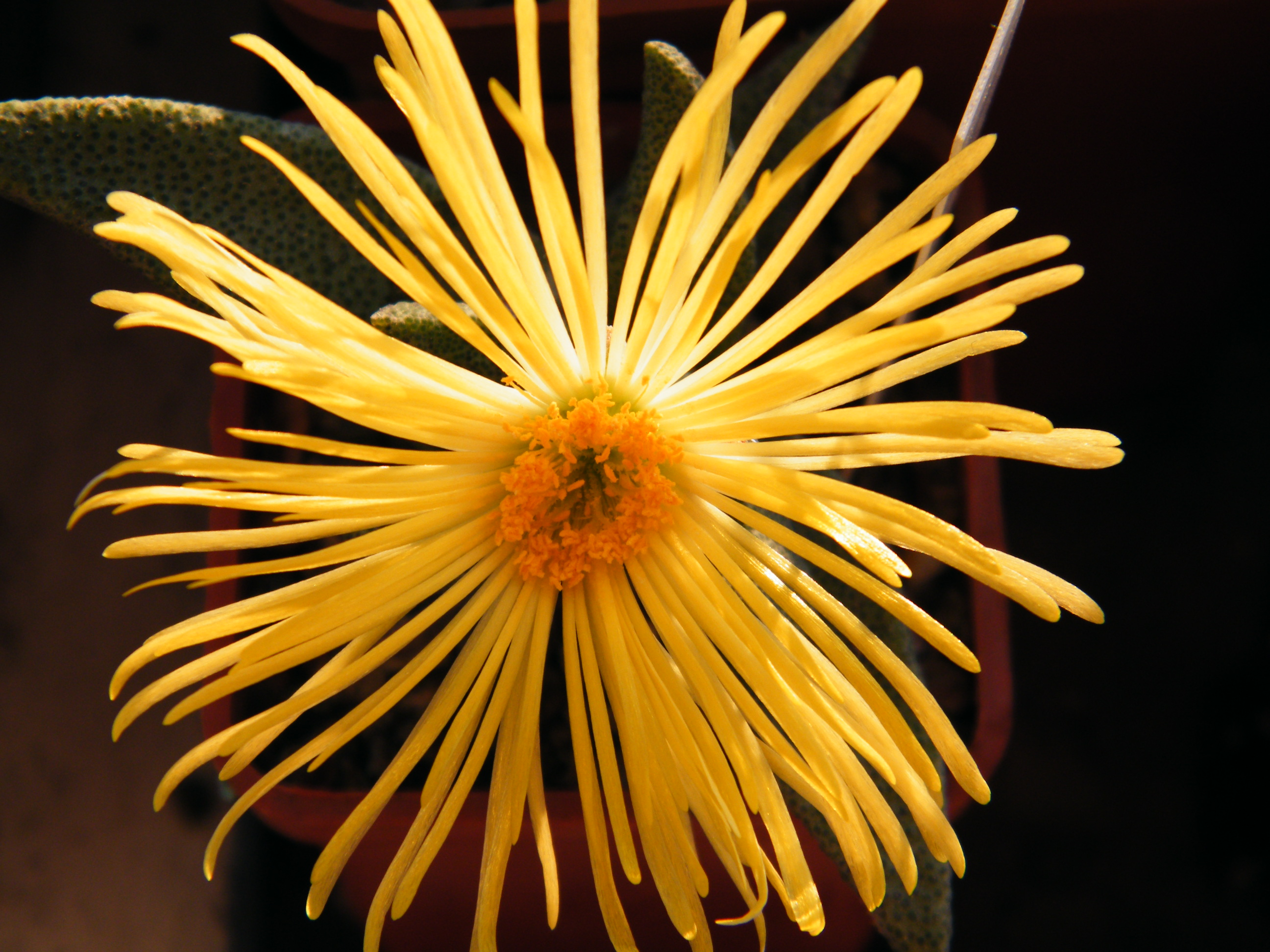

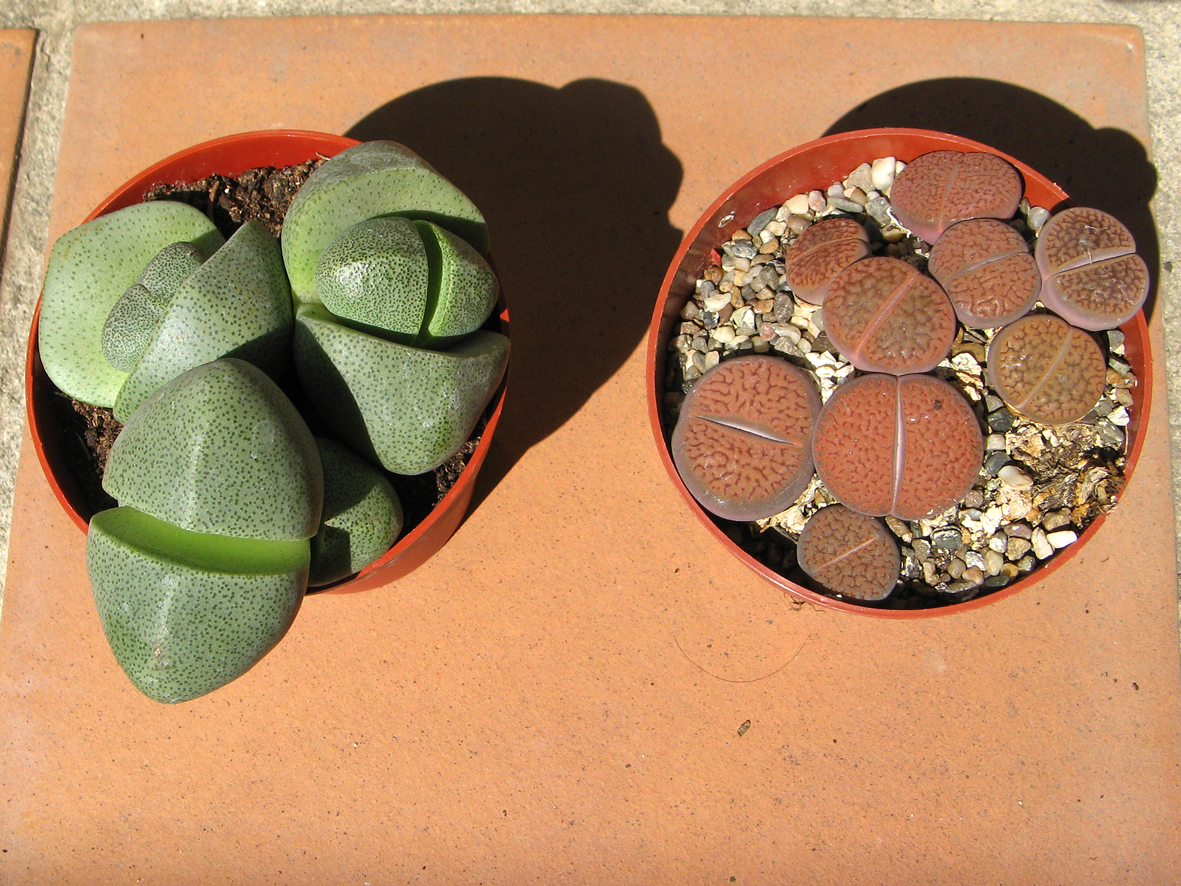
With Lithops hookerii

== Bibliography ==
- AFPD. 2008. African Flowering Plants Database - Base de Donnees des Plantes a Fleurs D'Afrique.
- Gibbs Russell, G. E., W. G. Welman, E. Reitief, K. L. Immelman, G. Germishuizen, B. J. Pienaar, M. v. Wyk & A. Nicholas. 1987. List of species of southern African plants. Mem. Bot. Surv. S. Africa 2(1–2): 1–152(pt. 1), 1–270(pt. 2).
- Bot. Jahrb. Syst. 106: 474 (1986).
- II. Handbook succulent plants: Aizoaceae F-Z : 219 (2001
