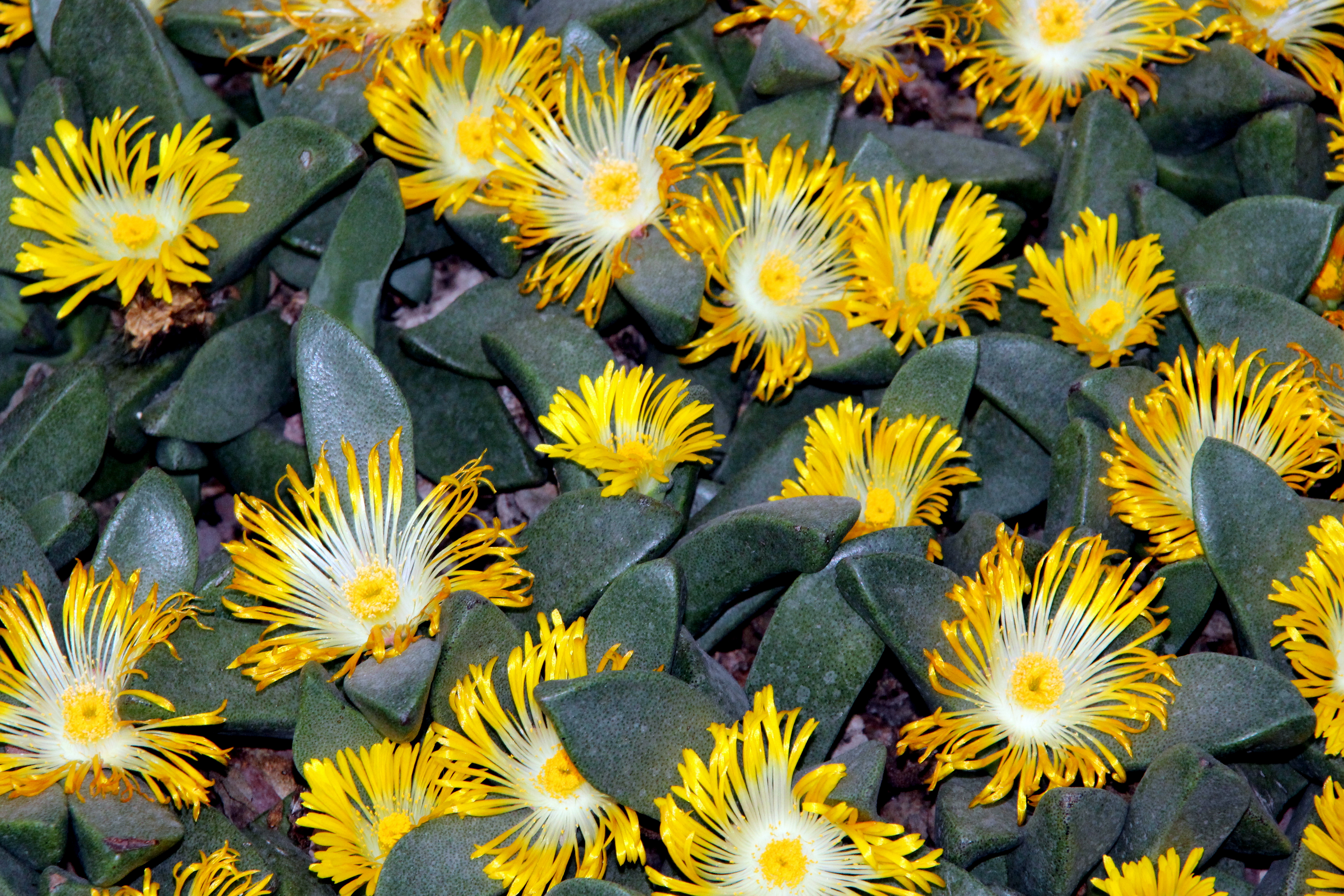
- Pleiospilos compactus subsp. canus

Scientific classification
- Kingdom: Plantae
- Clade: Embryophytes
- Clade: Tracheophytes
- Clade: Angiosperms
- Clade: Eudicots
- Order: Caryophyllales
- Family: Aizoaceae
- Genus: Pleiospilos
- Species: P. compactus

Binomial name
- Pleiospilos compactus (Aiton) Schwantes

Synonyms
- List: Mesembryanthemum compactum Aiton; Mesembryanthemum optatum N.E.Br.; Pleiospilos longibracteatus L.Bolus; Pleiospilos optatus (N.E.Br.) Schwantes; Punctillaria compacta (Aiton) N.E.Br.; Punctillaria optata (N.E.Br.) N.E.Br.

= Pleiospilos compactus =

Species of flowering plant

Pleiospilos compactus, called living rock, is a species of flowering plant in the ice plant genus Pleiospilos, native to the southwestern Cape Provinces of South Africa. A succulent, it has gained the Royal Horticultural Society's Award of Garden Merit.

== Subtaxa ==
The following subspecies are currently accepted:

- Pleiospilos compactus subsp. canus (Haw.) H.Hartmann & Liede
- Pleiospilos compactus subsp. fergusoniae (L.Bolus) H.Hartmann & Liede
- Pleiospilos compactus subsp. minor (L.Bolus) H.Hartmann & Liede
- Pleiospilos compactus subsp. sororius (N.E.Br.) H.Hartmann & Liede
