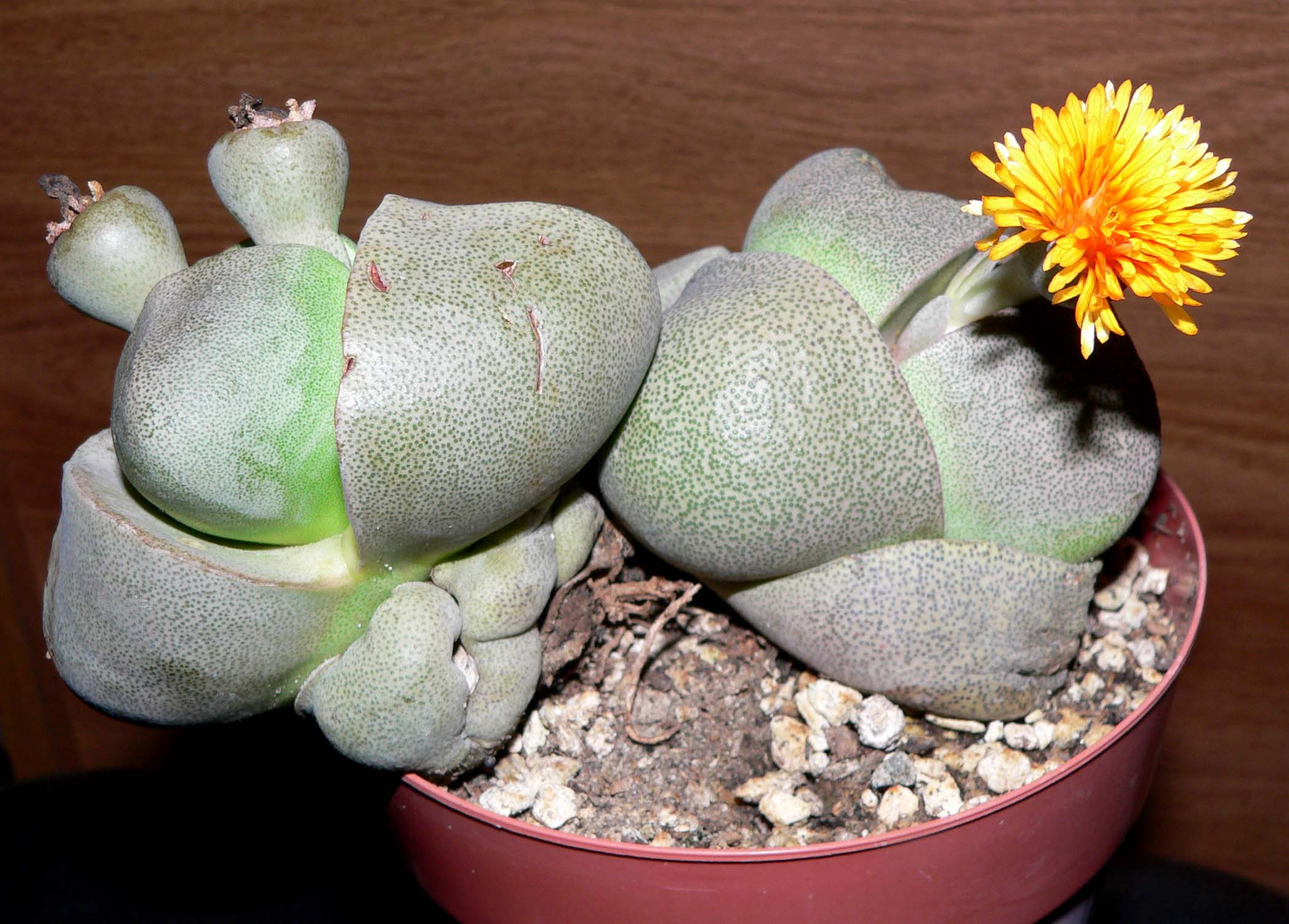
- Pleiospilos nelii

Scientific classification
- Kingdom: Plantae
- Clade: Tracheophytes
- Clade: Angiosperms
- Clade: Eudicots
- Order: Caryophyllales
- Family: Aizoaceae
- Subfamily: Ruschioideae
- Tribe: Ruschieae
- Genus: Pleiospilos; N.E.Br. (1925)

Species
- See text

Synonyms
- Bijlia N.E.Br. (1928); Bolusanthemum Schwantes (1928); Punctillaria N.E.Br. (1925)

= Pleiospilos =

Genus of succulents

Pleiospilos is a genus of succulent flowering plants of the family Aizoaceae. It is endemic to the Cape Provinces of South Africa. The name is derived from the Greek pleios "many" and spìlos "spot". The plants are also known as kwaggavy ("Quagga mesemb"), lewerplant ("liver plant"), lewervygie ("liver mesemb"), klipplant ("stone plant"), split rock or mimicry plant.

Pleiospilos species have two or four opposite, very fleshy, grey-green leaves growing from a short stem that may be underground. The leaves, with their hemispherical shape and pitted texture, often strongly resemble a pile of split pebbles to deter predators. Flowers emerge from the center of the leaves, and may be very big in relation to the overall size of the plant.

They reproduce both sexually and asexually. Vegetative offshoots emerge from the root system.

The species P. bolusii and P. nelii are cultivated as ornamentals.

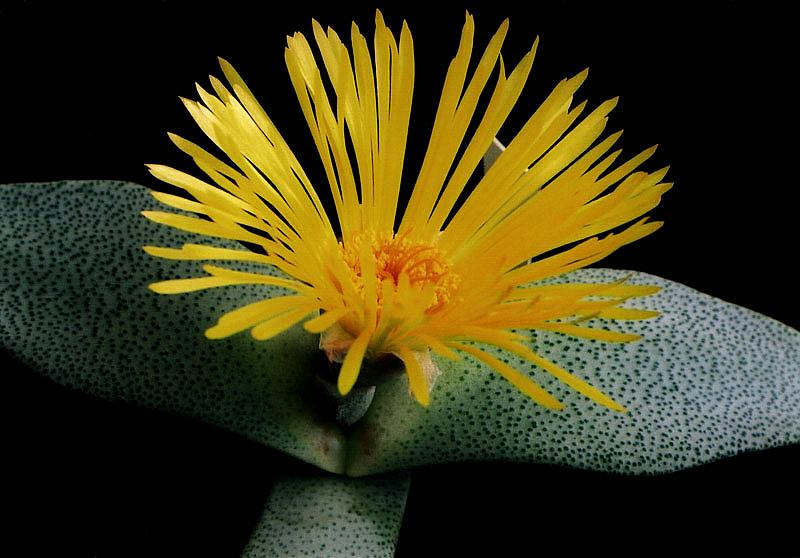
Pleiospilos - yellow flower

== Species ==
Four species, and one natural hybrid (nothospecies) are accepted:

- Pleiospilos bolusii (Hook.f.) N.E.Br.
- Pleiospilos compactus (Aiton) Schwantes
  - P. compactus subsp. compactus
  - P. compactus subsp. canus
  - P. compactus subsp. minor
  - P. compactus subsp. fergusoniae
  - P. compactus subsp. sororius
- Pleiospilos nelii Schwantes
- Pleiospilos × purpusii Schwantes
- Pleiospilos simulans (Marloth) N.E.Br.
