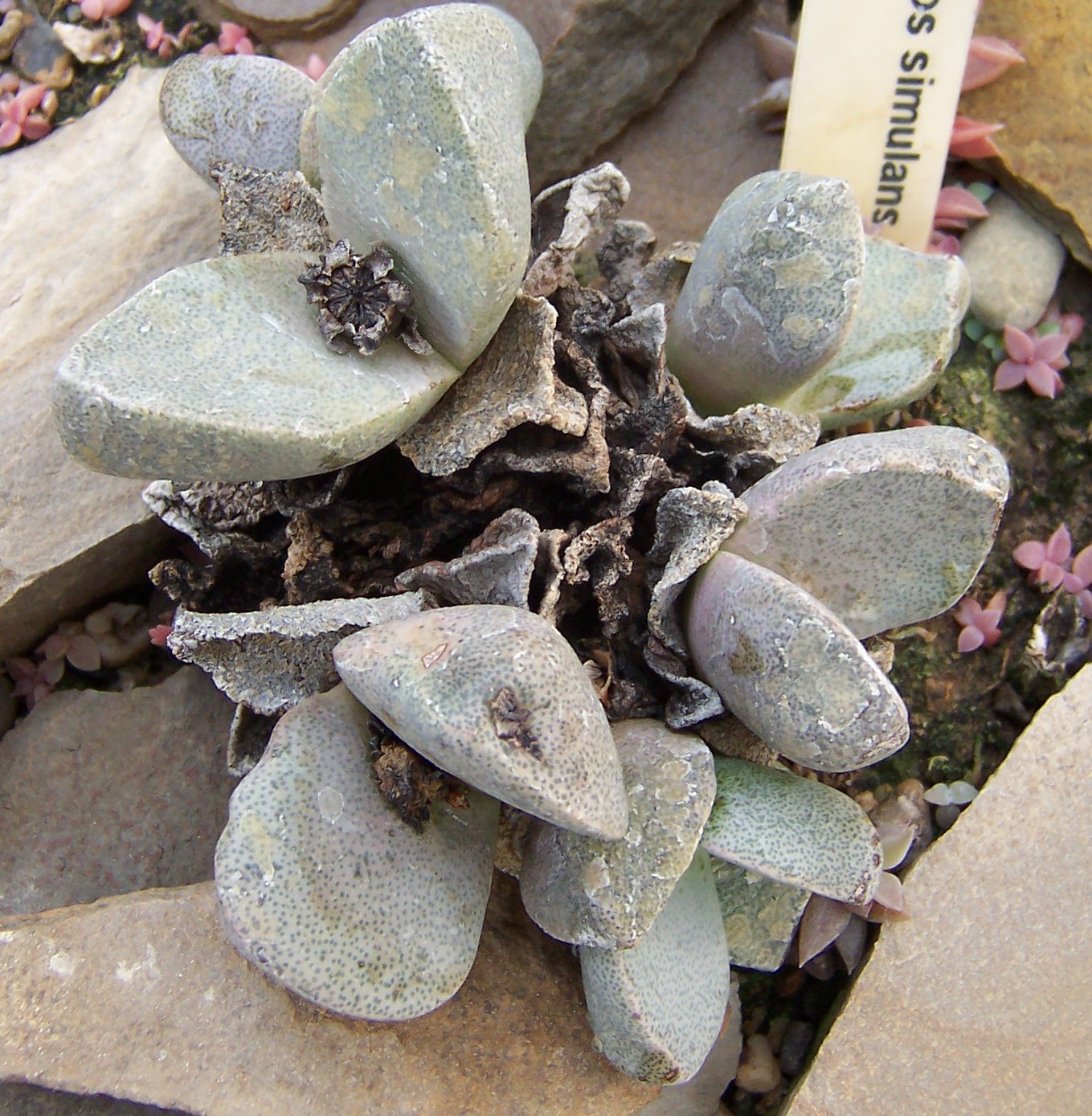
- In the Cologne University Botanical Collection

Scientific classification
- Kingdom: Plantae
- Clade: Tracheophytes
- Clade: Angiosperms
- Clade: Eudicots
- Order: Caryophyllales
- Family: Aizoaceae
- Genus: Pleiospilos
- Species: P. simulans

Binomial name
- Pleiospilos simulans (Marloth) N.E.Br.

Synonyms
- Mesembryanthemum simulans

= Pleiospilos simulans =

Species of succulent

Pleiospilos simulans (liver plant, split rock plant) is a species of flowering plant in the family Aizoaceae, endemic to the Eastern Cape of South Africa. The species is assessed as critically endangered due to its collection as an ornamental plant for succulent collectors. It is a small, low-growing, perennial with succulent leaves and orange or yellow many-petaled flowers.
