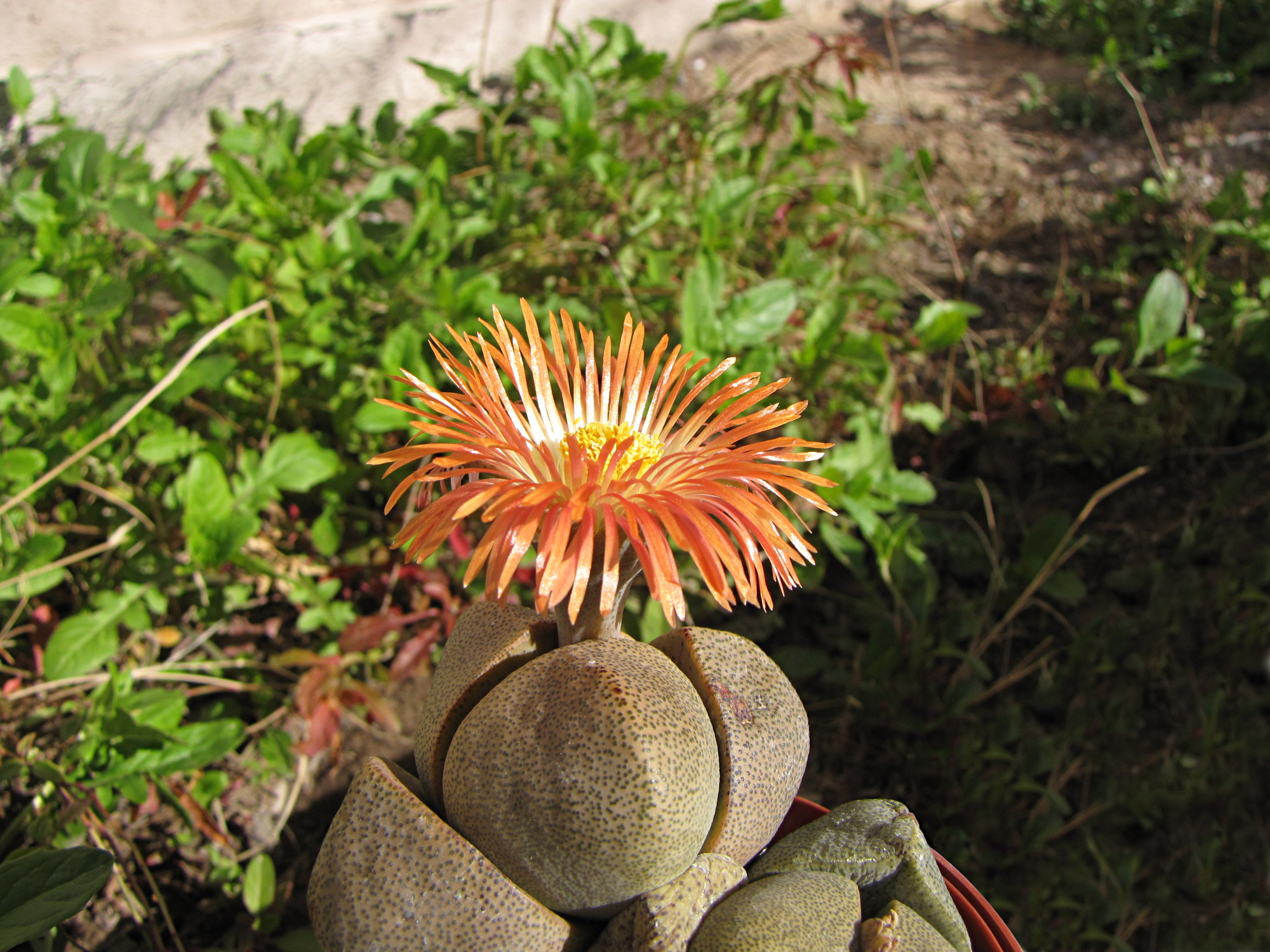

Scientific classification
- Kingdom: Plantae
- Clade: Tracheophytes
- Clade: Angiosperms
- Clade: Eudicots
- Order: Caryophyllales
- Family: Aizoaceae
- Genus: Pleiospilos
- Species: P. nelii

Binomial name
- Pleiospilos nelii Schwantes

Synonyms
- Pleiospilos pedunculatus L.Bolus (1930); Pleiospilos tricolor N.E.Br. (1930)

= Pleiospilos nelii =

Species of succulent

Pleiospilos nelii, the split rock, splitrock or living granite, is a species of flowering plant in the family Aizoaceae, native to South Africa. It grows in semi-arid areas with rainfall of between 150mm and 300mm, in the Karoo of South Africa.

== Etymology ==
The species epithet nelii honours the South African botanist Gert Cornelius Nel. The common name "split rock" refers to the appearance of the plant's leaves.

== Description ==
Pleiospilos nelii is a succulent perennial which can reach a height of 5–8 cm (2–3 in) and a diameter of about 10 cm (4 in). This very short-stemmed, nearly stemless plant has one or more pairs of opposite, almost hemispherical, grey-green or brownish leaves. The surface of the leaves has many small dark spots. A new pair of leaves is produced each year, replacing an older pair. This plant closely resembles a small cracked rock (hence the common name), an appearance which may have evolved as a defence against herbivory. The superficially daisy-like flowers are yellow-orange, 6–7.5 cm (2–3 in) across, and emerge from the plant's apical bud. The flowers are large in relation to the size of the plant. Each flower opens in the afternoon and closes at sunset, over a bloom period of several days.

== Cultivation ==
P. nelii is one of several plants cultivated for their rocklike appearance. They are sometimes collectively called mesembs. In temperate regions it is grown under glass for protection from excessive rain and hard freezes. It has gained the Royal Horticultural Society's Award of Garden Merit.

== Gallery ==
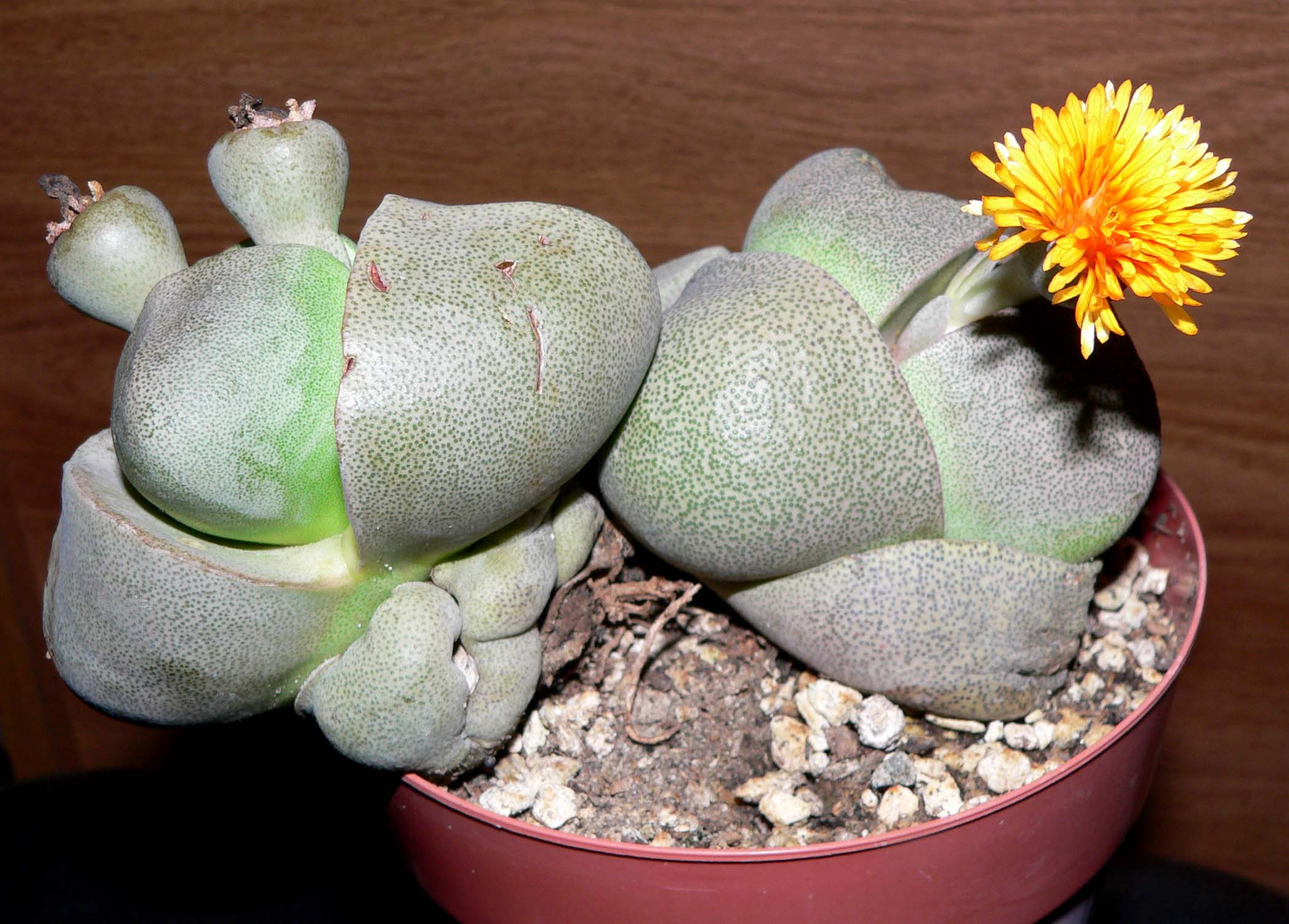

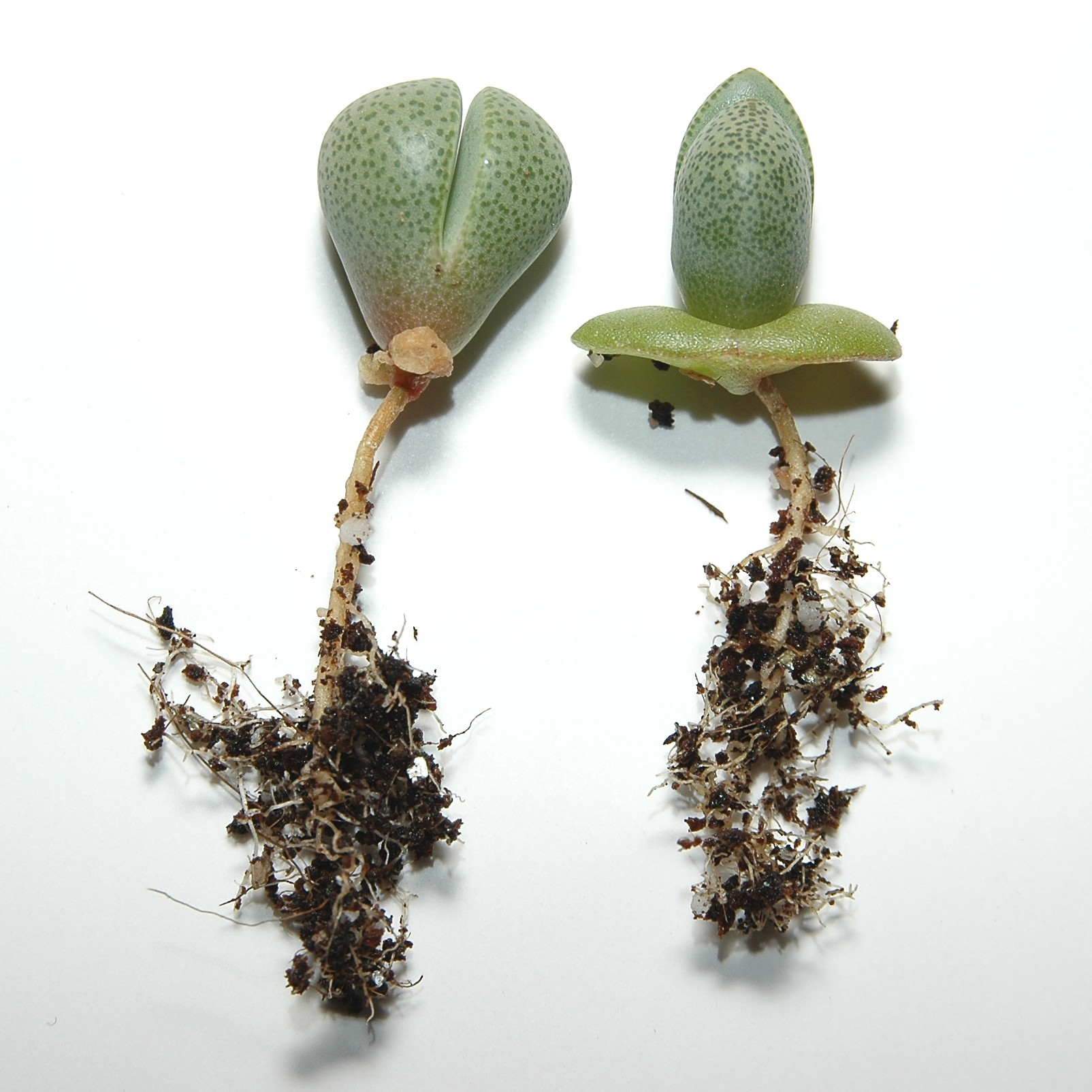
Plants with roots

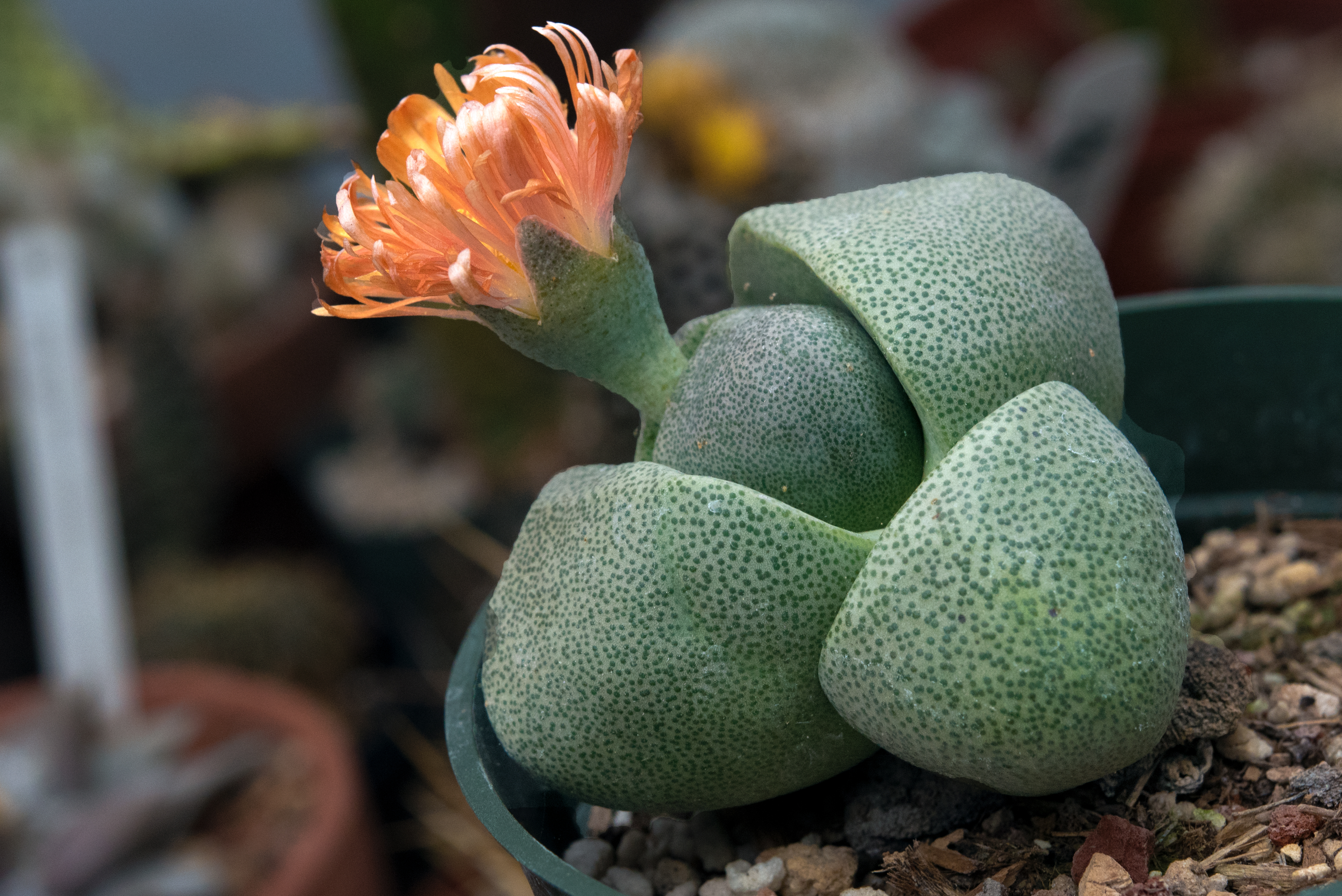

== Bibliography ==
1. AFPD. 2008. African Flowering Plants Database - Base de Donnees des Plantes a Fleurs D'Afrique.
2. Gibbs Russell, G. E., W. G. Welman, E. Reitief, K. L. Immelman, G. Germishuizen, B. J. Pienaar, M. v. Wyk & A. Nicholas. 1987. List of species of southern African plants. Mem. Bot. Surv. S. Africa 2(1–2): 1–152(pt. 1), 1–270(pt. 2).
3. Fl. Pl. Africa 47: t.1865B (1983).
4. Bot. Jahrb. Syst. 106: 475 (1986).
5. Il. Handbook succulent plants: Aizoaceae F-Z : 220 (2001).
6. Aloe 43[2&3]: 31 (2006).
