= Alpine gentian =

Alpine gentian is a common name for several plants in the genus Gentiana and may refer to:

- Gentiana alpina, native to the Alps of Europe
- Gentiana newberryi, native to western North America
- Gentiana nivalis, native to Europe and northeastern North America
