= Appalachian gentian =

Appalachian gentian may refer to:

- Gentiana austromontana, with blue to purple flowers
- Gentiana decora, with white to blue flowers
