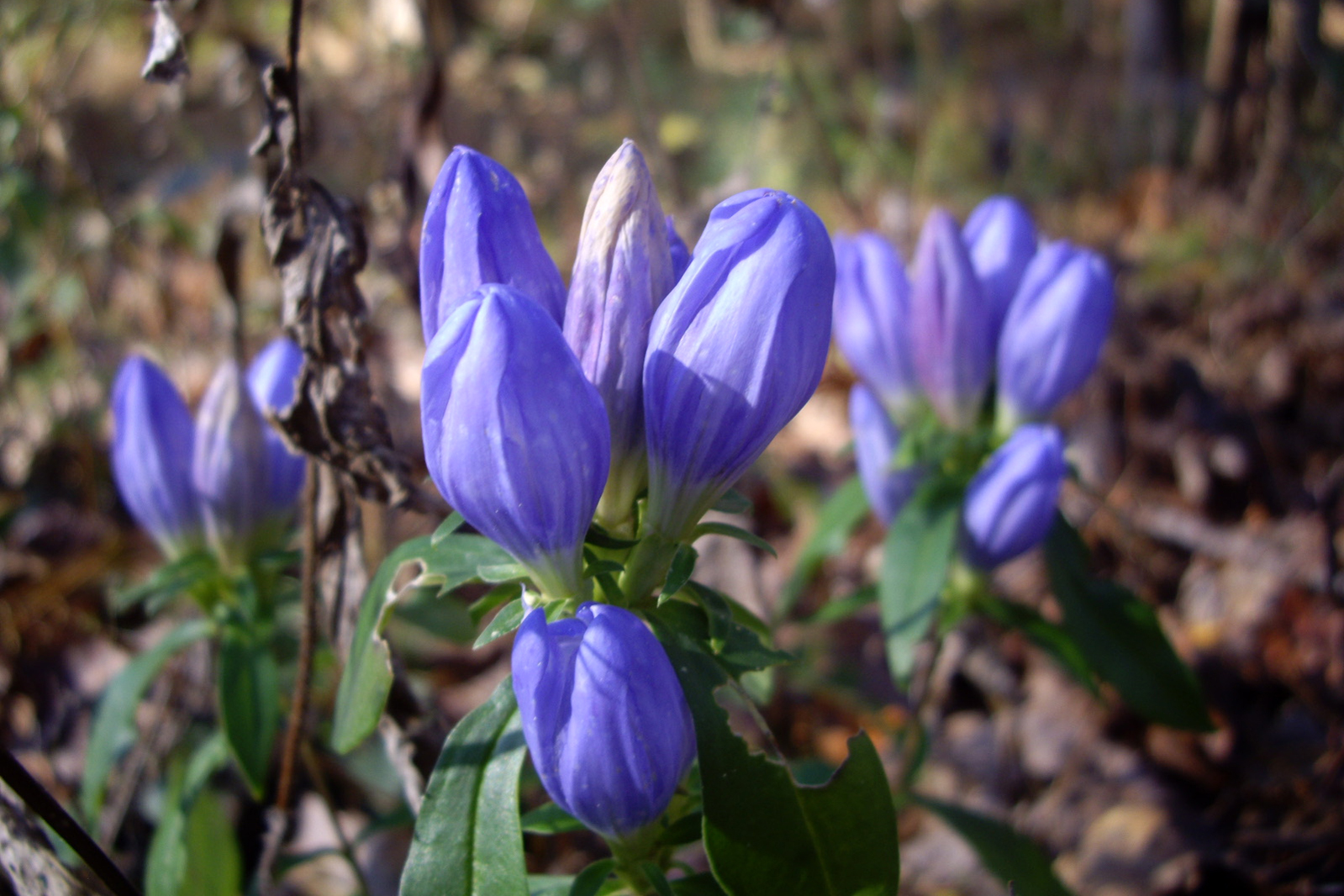

Conservation status
- Secure (NatureServe)

Scientific classification
- Kingdom: Plantae
- Clade: Tracheophytes
- Clade: Angiosperms
- Clade: Eudicots
- Clade: Asterids
- Order: Gentianales
- Family: Gentianaceae
- Genus: Gentiana
- Species: G. saponaria

Binomial name
- Gentiana saponaria L.

= Gentiana saponaria =

Species of plant

Gentiana saponaria, the soapwort gentian or harvestbells, is a 1–2 ft (30–61 cm) tall flowering plant in the Gentianaceae family.

== Description ==
Similar to the "bottle" gentians like Gentiana clausa and Gentiana andrewsii, it has paired, lanceolate leaves on unbranched stalks, blue or purple blooms, and a stout taproot. The flowers are pollinated by bumblebees.

== Distribution and habitat ==
It is native to eastern North America south of the Great Lakes, from Wisconsin to New York, and south to Texas and Florida. It is rare in its range, usually found in undisturbed sandy soils.
