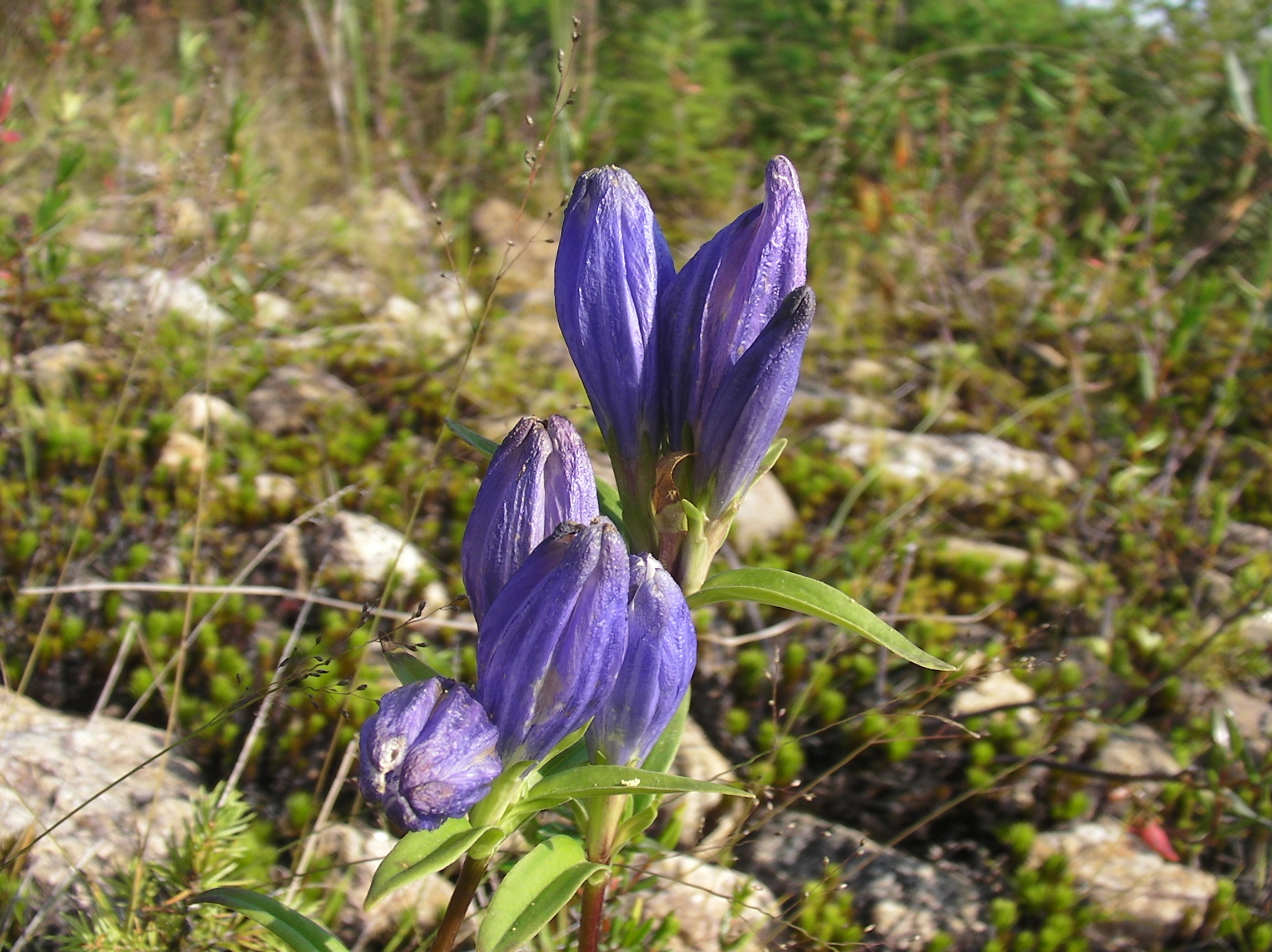

Scientific classification
- Kingdom: Plantae
- Clade: Tracheophytes
- Clade: Angiosperms
- Clade: Eudicots
- Clade: Asterids
- Order: Gentianales
- Family: Gentianaceae
- Genus: Gentiana
- Species: G. linearis

Binomial name
- Gentiana linearis Froel.

= Gentiana linearis =

Species of plant

Gentiana linearis, the narrowleaf gentian, is a 1–2 ft (30–61 cm) tall flowering plant in the Gentianaceae family. It is native to northeastern North America from Manitoba to Maine, and to the Appalachian Mountains of West Virginia, Virginia, and Tennessee. Similar to the "bottle gentians" like Gentiana clausa and Gentiana andrewsii, it has paired, lanceolate leaves, usually on unbranched stalks, and blue or purple blooms which remain closed or nearly closed; the leaves are narrower however, as the specific name indicates.
