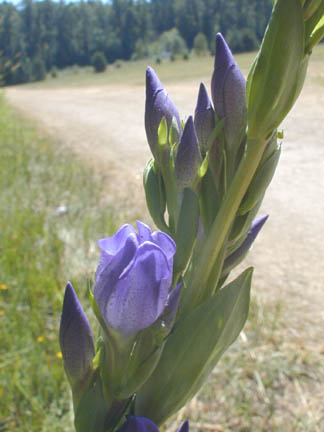

Conservation status
- Least Concern (IUCN 3.1)

Scientific classification
- Kingdom: Plantae
- Clade: Tracheophytes
- Clade: Angiosperms
- Clade: Eudicots
- Clade: Asterids
- Order: Gentianales
- Family: Gentianaceae
- Genus: Gentiana
- Species: G. sceptrum

Binomial name
- Gentiana sceptrum Griseb.

Synonyms
- Pneumonanthe sceptrum (Griseb.) Greene; Dasystephana menziesii (Griseb.) Arthur; Gentiana menziesii Griseb.; Gentiana orfordii Howell; Gentiana sceptrum var. cascadensis M.Peck; Gentiana sceptrum var. humilis Engelm. ex A.Gray; Pneumonanthe menziesii (Griseb.) Greene

= Gentiana sceptrum =

Species of plant

Gentiana sceptrum is a species of flowering plant in the family Gentianaceae. It is known by the common names king's scepter gentian or king's gentian.

It is native to the west coast of North America from British Columbia to northern California. It grows in wet areas in the hills and mountains, such as flooded meadows and bogs. It is also found at sea level in sphagnum bogs. This is a perennial herb with stems growing along the ground or erect and approaching a meter in height. The stems are leafy, with each oval-shaped leaf several centimeters long and about half as wide. Flowers are solitary or clustered in inflorescences of several. Each flower is four to five centimeters long and two or three wide at the mouth when open. The corolla is dark blue to purple with pointed lobes. The fruit is a capsule containing seeds with small wings.
