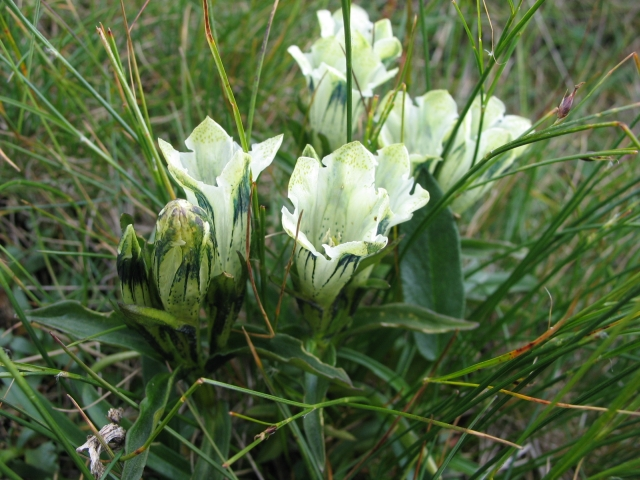

Scientific classification
- Kingdom: Plantae
- Clade: Tracheophytes
- Clade: Angiosperms
- Clade: Eudicots
- Clade: Asterids
- Order: Gentianales
- Family: Gentianaceae
- Genus: Gentiana
- Species: G. frigida

Binomial name
- Gentiana frigida Haenke

= Gentiana frigida =

Species of plant

Gentiana frigida is a small perennial flowering plant of the genus Gentiana that is found in the Carpathian Mountains and eastern Alps.
