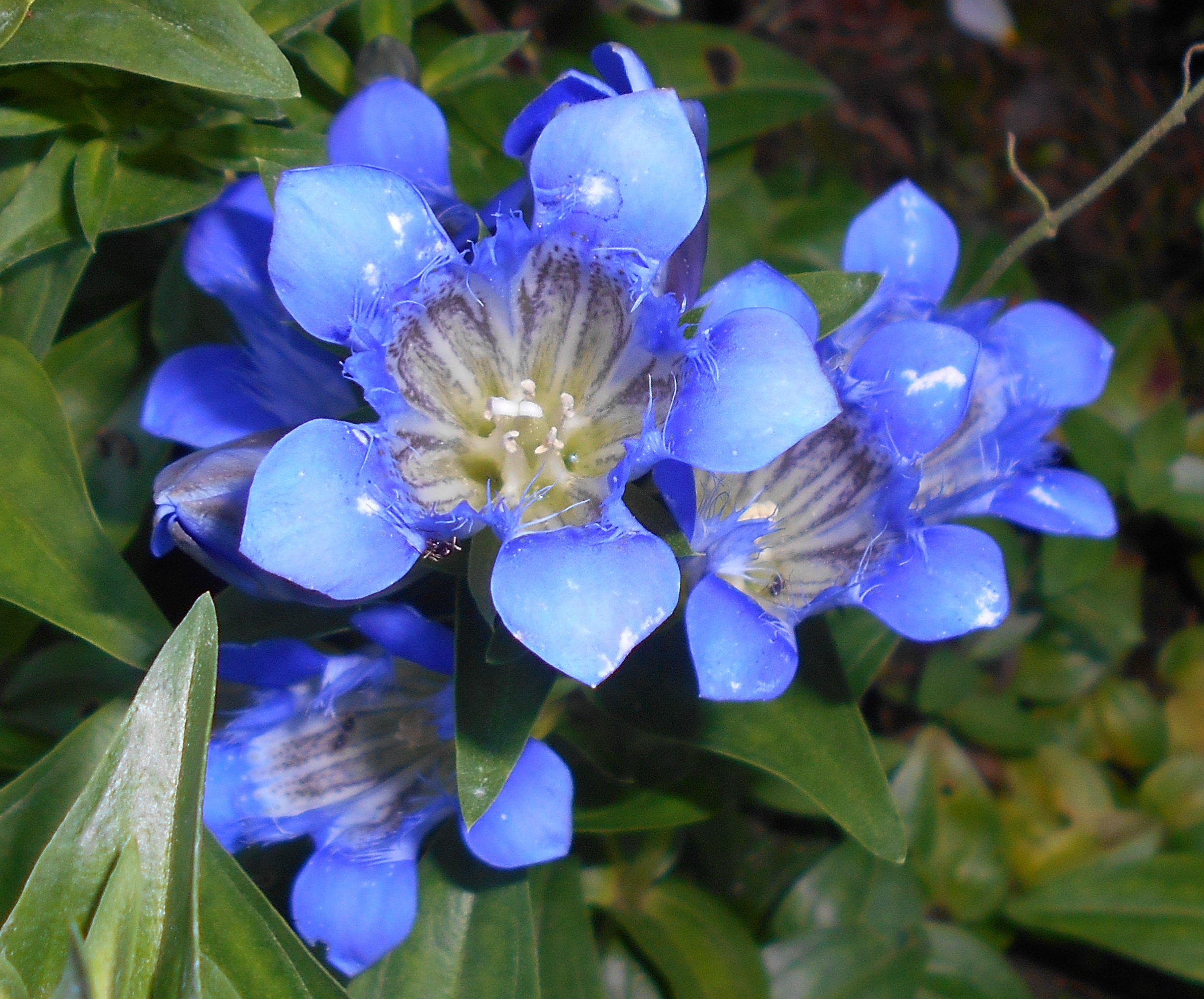

Scientific classification
- Kingdom: Plantae
- Clade: Tracheophytes
- Clade: Angiosperms
- Clade: Eudicots
- Clade: Asterids
- Order: Gentianales
- Family: Gentianaceae
- Genus: Gentiana
- Species: G. septemfida

Binomial name
- Gentiana septemfida Pall.

= Gentiana septemfida =

Species of plant

Gentiana septemfida, the crested gentian or summer gentian, is a species of flowering plant in the family Gentianaceae, native to the Caucasus and Turkey. It is a low-growing herbaceous perennial growing to 15–20 cm (6–8 in) tall by 30 cm (12 in) wide, bearing up to eight bright blue trumpet-shaped blooms in summer, with striped interiors. It requires a rich, moist soil and full sun.

The Latin specific epithet septemfida means "with seven divisions".

In cultivation this plant and the darker-flowered variety G. septemfida var. lagodechiana have gained the Royal Horticultural Society's Award of Garden Merit.
