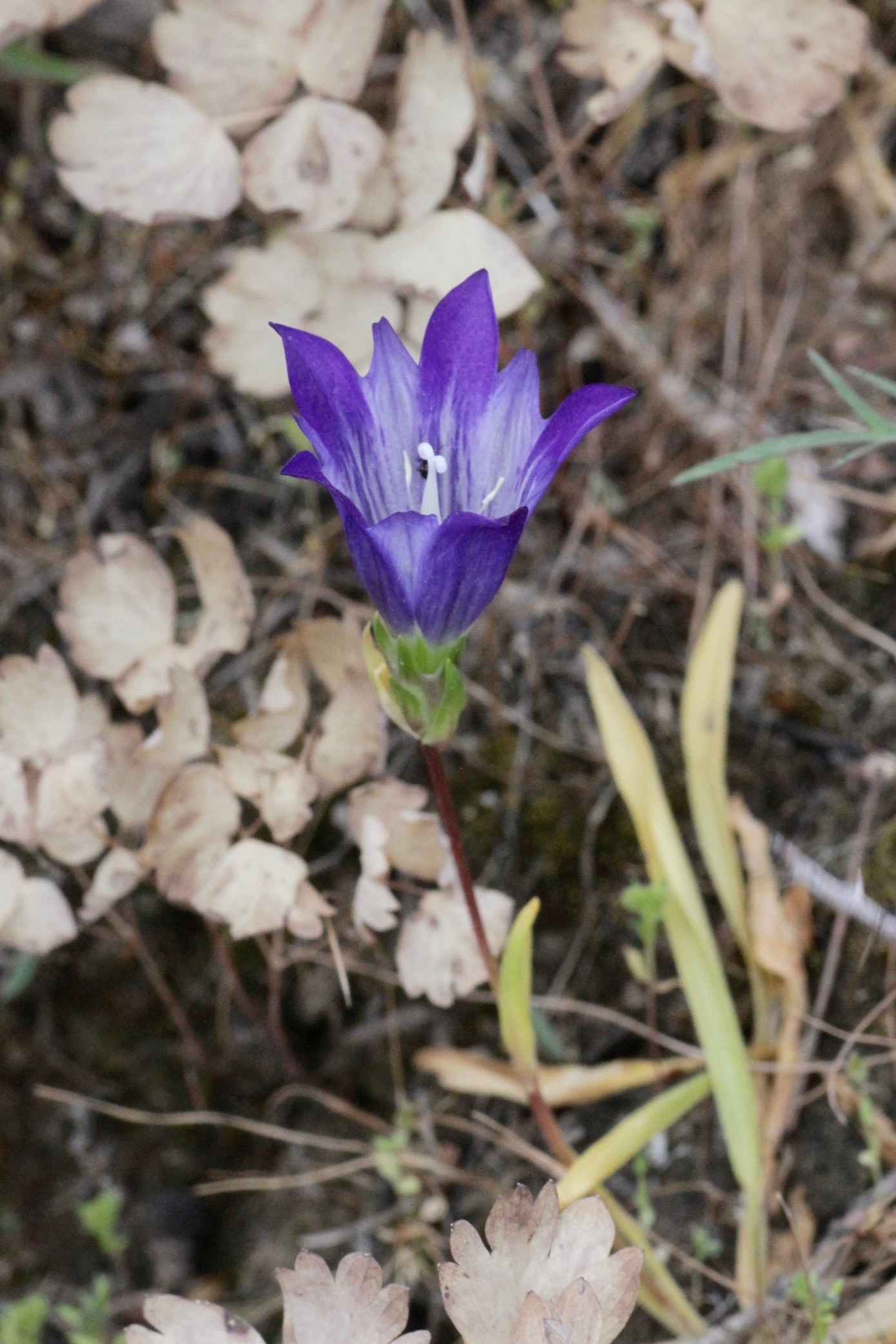

Scientific classification
- Kingdom: Plantae
- Clade: Tracheophytes
- Clade: Angiosperms
- Clade: Eudicots
- Clade: Asterids
- Order: Gentianales
- Family: Gentianaceae
- Genus: Gentiana
- Species: G. olivieri

Binomial name
- Gentiana olivieri Griseb.

Synonyms
- Gentianodes olivieri (Griseb.) Omer, Ali & Qaiser; Tretorhiza olivieri (Griseb.) Soják; Gentiana olivieri var. aucheri Griseb.; Gentiana regeliana Gand.; Gentiana weschniakowii Regel

= Gentiana olivieri =

Species of plant

Gentiana olivieri (Chinese: xie wan que qin jiao) is a species of flowering plant in the family Gentianaceae found in Asia.

Bioassay-directed fractionation techniques led to isolation of isoorientin as the main hypoglycemic component in G. olivieri.
