= Gentiana austromontana =

Scientific classification
- Kingdom: Plantae
- Clade: Tracheophytes
- Clade: Angiosperms
- Clade: Eudicots
- Clade: Asterids
- Order: Gentianales
- Family: Gentianaceae
- Genus: Gentiana
- Species: G. austromontana

Binomial name
- Gentiana austromontana J.S.Pringle & Sharp

Species of plant

Gentiana austromontana, the Appalachian gentian, is a 1–2 ft (30–61 cm) tall flowering plant in the Gentianaceae family. It is native to the southern Appalachians of West Virginia, Virginia, North Carolina and Tennessee. Very similar to Gentiana clausa, it has paired, lanceolate leaves, usually on unbranched stalks, and blue or purple blooms which remain closed or nearly closed. It flowers from late August to October. It is thought that G. austromotana is the product of hybridization between G. clausa and G. decora as the Appalachian Gentian is found only in area where the former two are sympatric.
