= Gentiana villosa =

Striped gentian

Scientific classification
- Kingdom: Plantae
- Clade: Tracheophytes
- Clade: Angiosperms
- Clade: Eudicots
- Clade: Asterids
- Order: Gentianales
- Family: Gentianaceae
- Genus: Gentiana
- Species: G. villosa

Binomial name
- Gentiana villosa L.
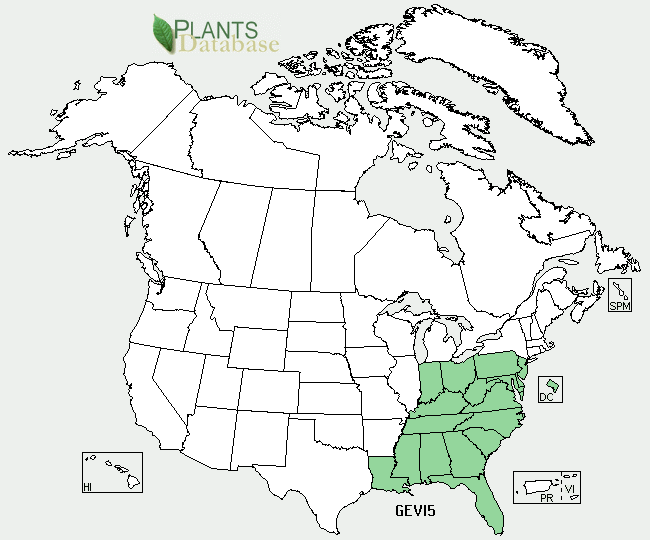
- Range of G. villosa in North America

Species of plant

Gentiana villosa, the striped gentian, is a herbaceous perennial plant belonging to the genus Gentiana. It is found mainly in the Eastern United States and is used medicinally by Native American tribes.

== Description ==
Gentiana villosa can reach a height of two feet. The leaves are lanceolet but are typically wider above the middle of the leaf. The leaves are dark green and shiny. The flowers are clustered at the terminal bud of the plant and are white with purple stripes. G. villosa typically blooms during the fall in late August to October. The flowers are pollinated by insects that are attracted to their purple stripes and nectar. G. villosa fruits during October to November. The seeds of G. villosa differ from other Gentians because they are wingless.

It is believed that G. villosa was misnamed because "villosa" translated in Latin means "hairy" and G. villosa actually has no hair which is known as glabrous. The flowers of G. villosa make this plant easy to identify because of their defined purple stripes.

== Distribution ==
Gentiana villosa is found mainly in pine barrens and open woodland regions of eighteen states in the East coast regions of the United States and spanning out to the mid-east regions of the United States. The states that G. villosa can be found in are AL, DC, DE, FL, GA, IN, KY, LA, MD, MS, NC, NJ, OH, PA, SC, TN, VA, WV. Of these eighteen states four of them IN, PA, OH, and MD have listed G. villosa as an endangered species.

== Uses ==
As the common name Sampson's snakeroot indicates, G. villosa is thought to aid in the relief of snakebites. In Appalachia the roots of G. villosa are carried as a charm. The Catawba Indians used the boiled roots as medicine to relieve back pain.
