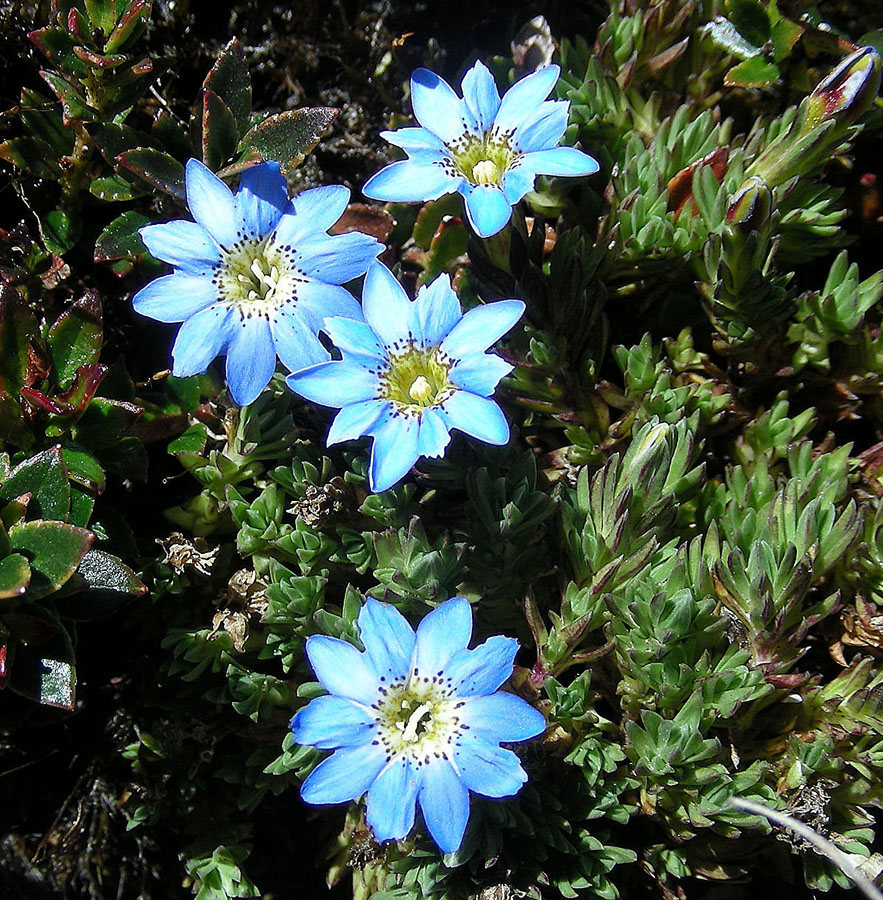

Scientific classification
- Kingdom: Plantae
- Clade: Tracheophytes
- Clade: Angiosperms
- Clade: Eudicots
- Clade: Asterids
- Order: Gentianales
- Family: Gentianaceae
- Genus: Gentiana
- Species: G. sedifolia

Binomial name
- Gentiana sedifolia Kunth

Synonyms
- List: Ericala sedifolia G.Don; Gentiana casapaltensis (Ball) J.S. Pringle; Gentiana cespitosa Willd. ex Schult.; Gentiana chimboracensis Willd. ex Schult.; Gentiana podocarpa (Phil.) Griseb.; Gentiana prostrata f. imbricata Kusn.; Gentiana prostrata var. podocarpa (Phil.) Kusn.; Gentiana prostrata subsp. podocarpa (Phil.) Halda; Gentiana ramosissima Phil. [Illegitimate]; Gentiana sedifolia f. acaulis Kuntze; Gentiana sedifolia var. casapaltensis Ball; Gentiana sedifolia var. compacta Griseb.; Gentiana sedifolia var. elongata Griseb.; Gentiana sedifolia var. grandiflora Kusn.; Gentiana sedifolia var. imbricata Griseb.; Gentiana sedifolia var. lineata Phil.; Gentiana sedifolia var. micrantha Wedd.; Gentiana sedifolia var. nana Kusn.; Gentiana sedifolia var. sedifolia; Gentiana sedifolia var. splendens Wedd.; Gentiana sirensis J.S. Pringle; Hippion prostratum (Haenke) Schmidt en Roem.; Varasia podocarpa Phil.; Varasia sedifolia (Kunth) Soják

= Gentiana sedifolia =

Species of plant

Gentiana sedifolia is a species of plant in the family Gentianaceae. It can be found in regions from Costa Rica to northern Chile.

== Description ==
Small herbs with narrow, opposite leaves; leaves up to 0.7 cm long. Small funnel shaped flowers up to 1 cm in diameter, pale blue or violet, with a yellow, white or pale yellow center. Flowers close at night or during cold and cloudy days.

== Distribution and habitat ==
Bogs at high elevation grasslands (puna and páramo), from Costa Rica to northern Chile. It is present at protected areas such as Cajas National Park, Huascarán National Park and Junín National Reserve.

== Vernacular names ==
Genciana (Colombia); pinjachi (Bolivia).
