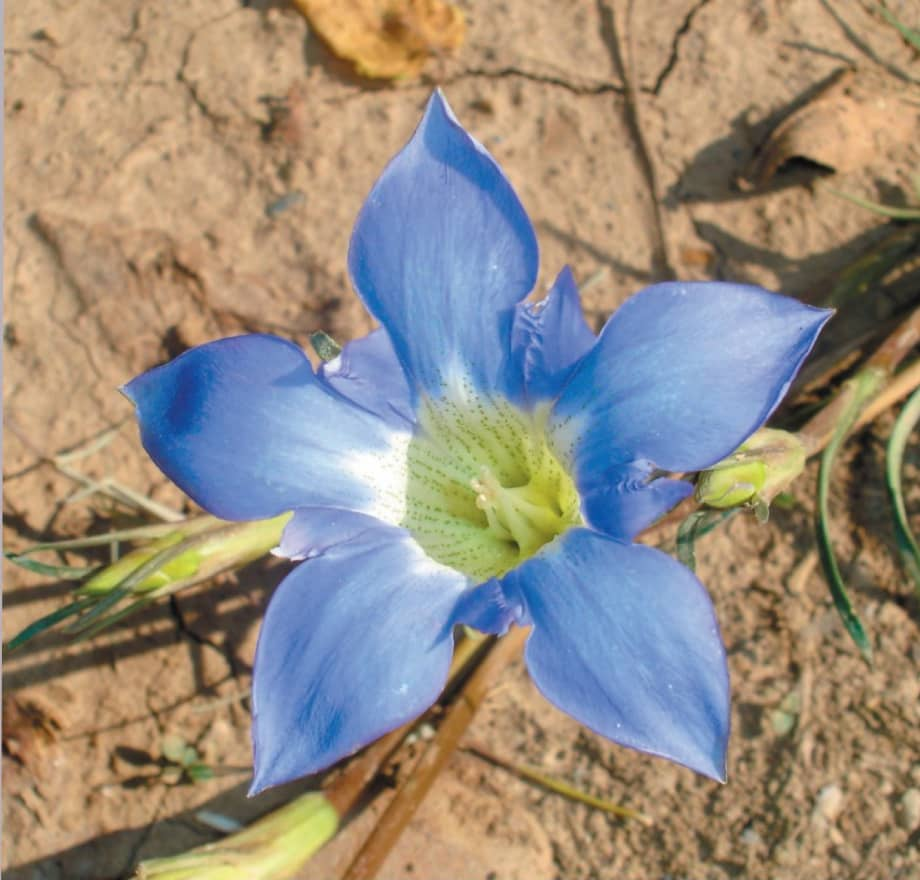

Conservation status
- Critically Endangered (IUCN 3.1)

Scientific classification
- Kingdom: Plantae
- Clade: Tracheophytes
- Clade: Angiosperms
- Clade: Eudicots
- Clade: Asterids
- Order: Gentianales
- Family: Gentianaceae
- Genus: Gentiana
- Species: G. kurroo

Binomial name
- Gentiana kurroo Royle

Synonyms
- Gentianodes kurroo (Royle) Omer, Ali & Qaiser; Pneumonanthe kurroo (Royle) G.Don; Tretorhiza kurroo (Royle) Soják

= Gentiana kurroo =

Species of flowering plant

Gentiana kurroo, also known as Indian gentian or Himalayan gentian, was named after the Illyrian monarch Gentius, who discovered the medicinal properties of the gentian root. Its scientific name, Gentiana kurroo, comes from the native term "karu", meaning "bitter". This perennial herb is critically endangered.

== Gallery ==
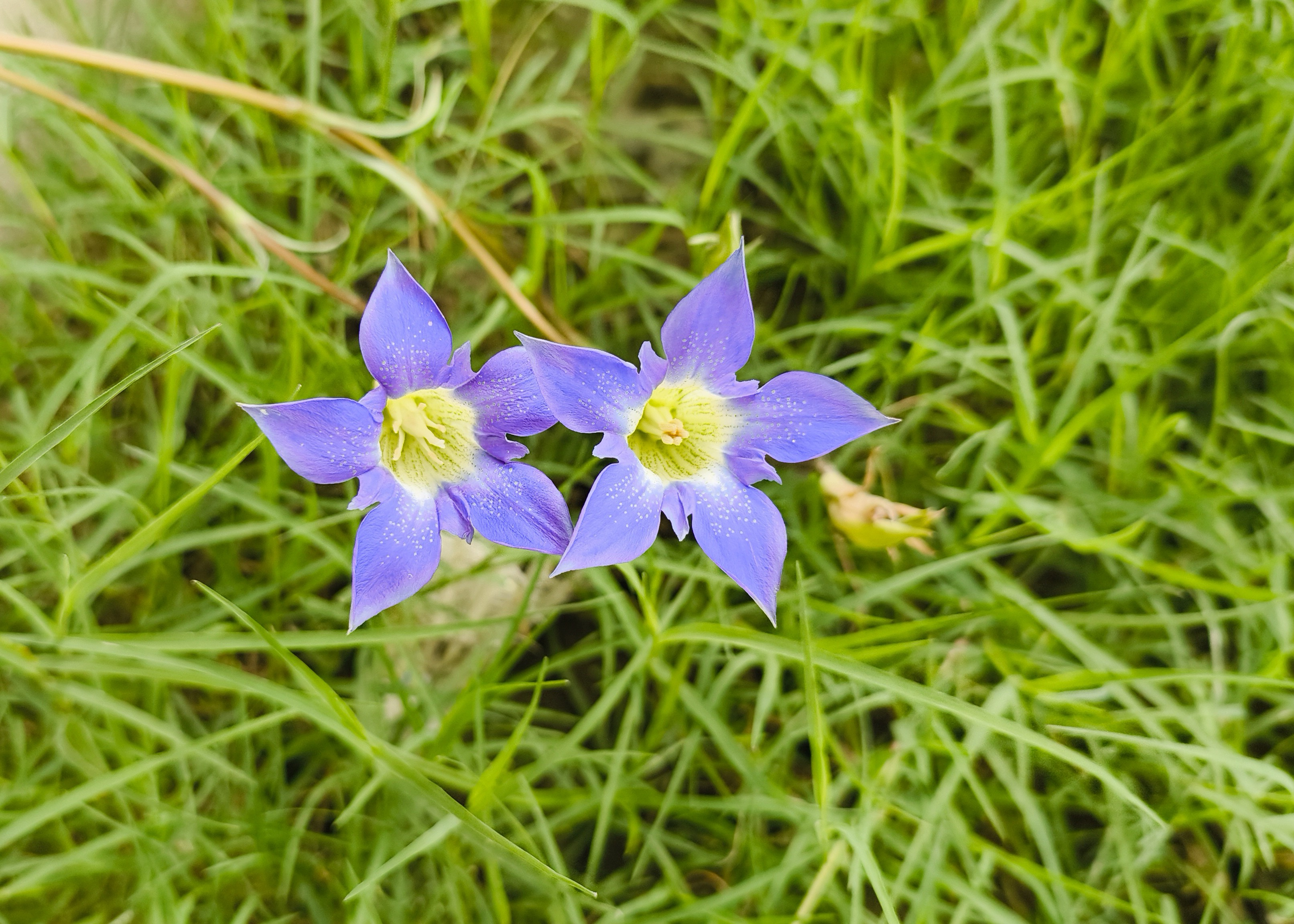
Gentiana kurroo in Kashmir
