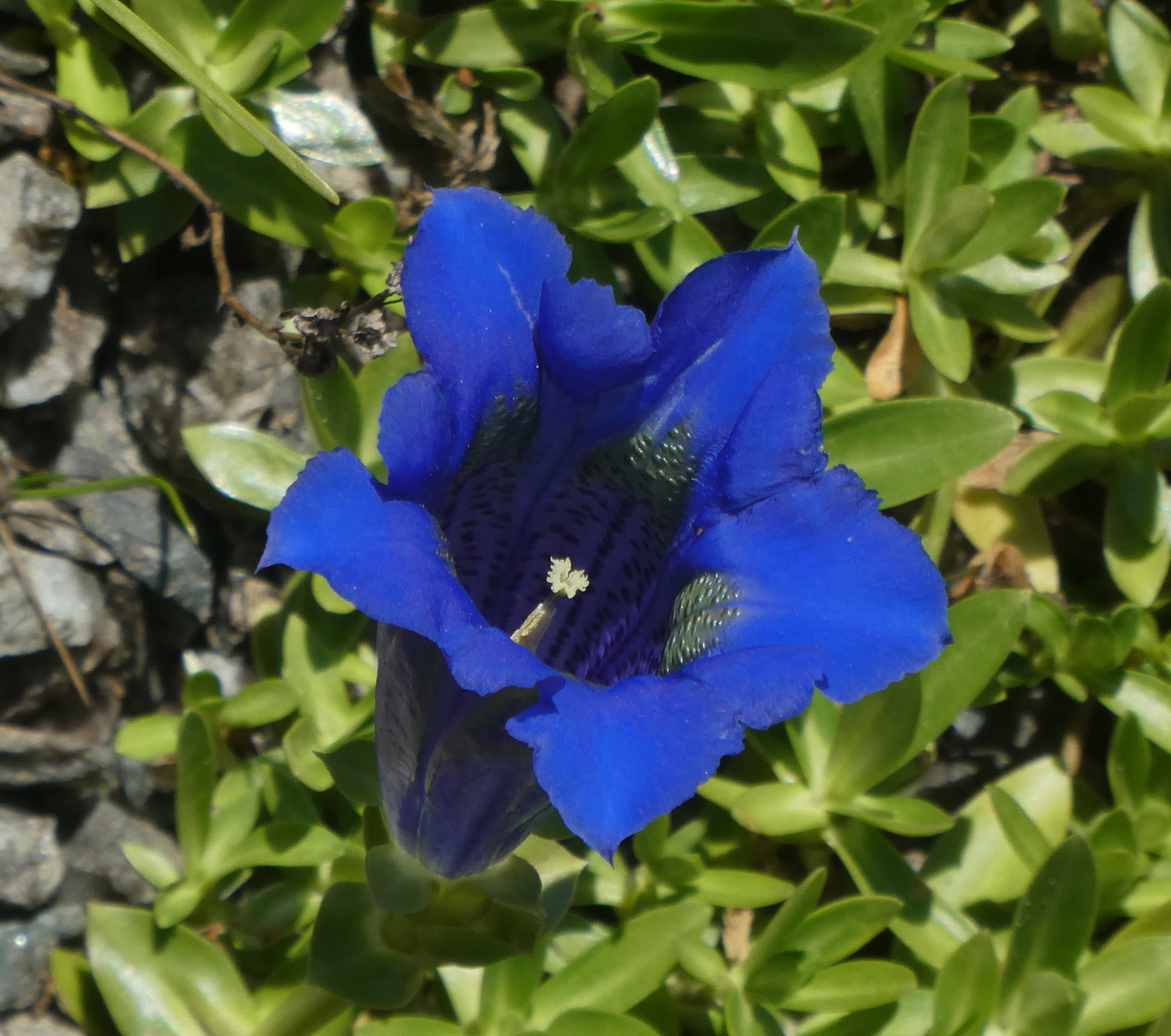

Scientific classification
- Kingdom: Plantae
- Clade: Tracheophytes
- Clade: Angiosperms
- Clade: Eudicots
- Clade: Asterids
- Order: Gentianales
- Family: Gentianaceae
- Genus: Gentiana
- Species: G. occidentalis

Binomial name
- Gentiana occidentalis Jakow.

= Gentiana occidentalis =

Species of flowering plants

Gentiana occidentalis is a species of Gentian found in the Pyrenean Mountains in northern Spain in the alpine zone. It is distinguished from other similar Gentians in the Pyrenees by the sepals which have incurved tips.
