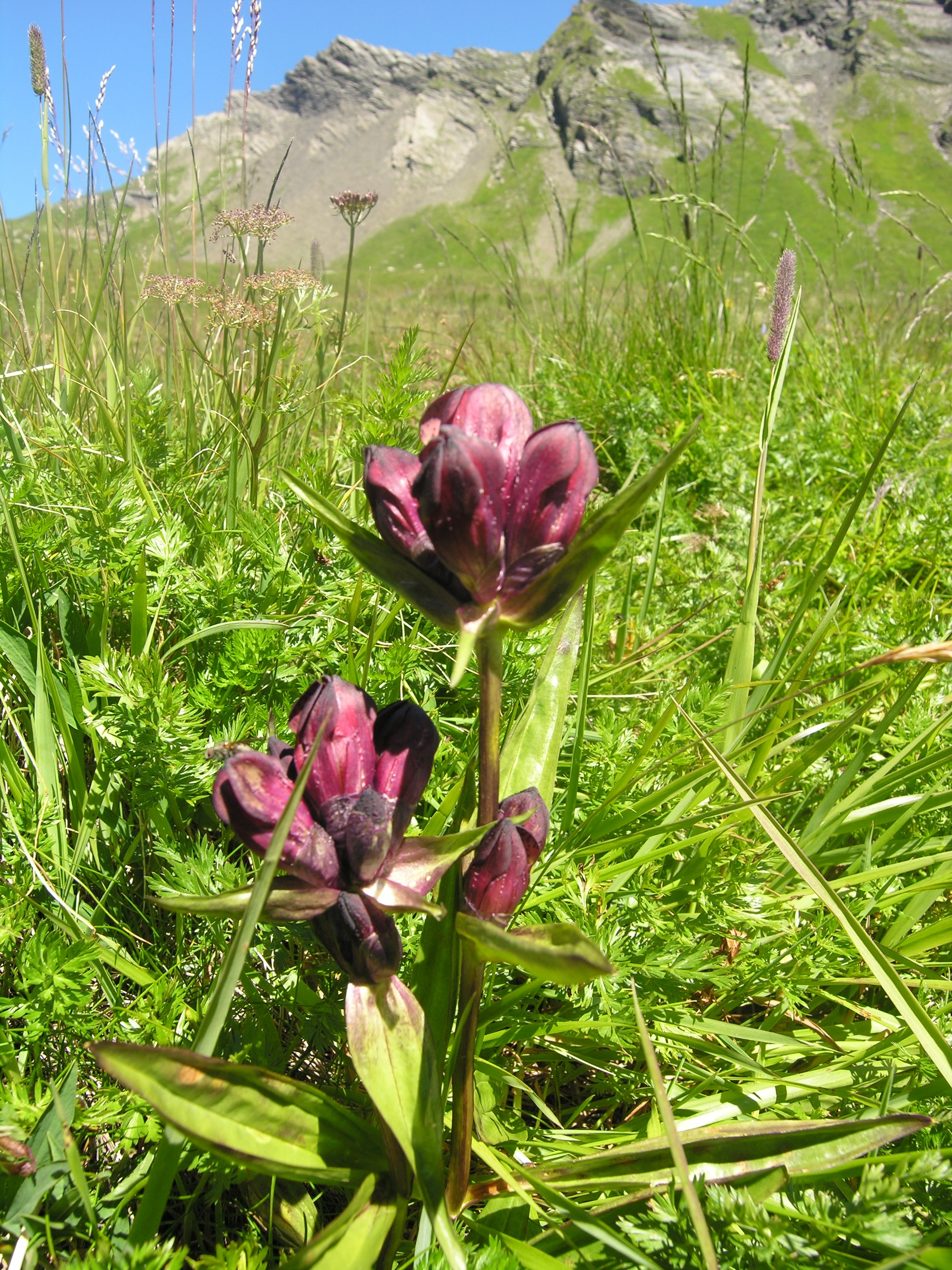

Scientific classification
- Kingdom: Plantae
- Clade: Tracheophytes
- Clade: Angiosperms
- Clade: Eudicots
- Clade: Asterids
- Order: Gentianales
- Family: Gentianaceae
- Genus: Gentiana
- Species: G. purpurea

Binomial name
- Gentiana purpurea L.

= Gentiana purpurea =

Species of plant

Gentiana purpurea, the purple gentian, is a plant species in the genus Gentiana. Flowers from July to August. The root is sometimes used in the manufacture of gentian bitters. It is native to Central and Northern Europe.
