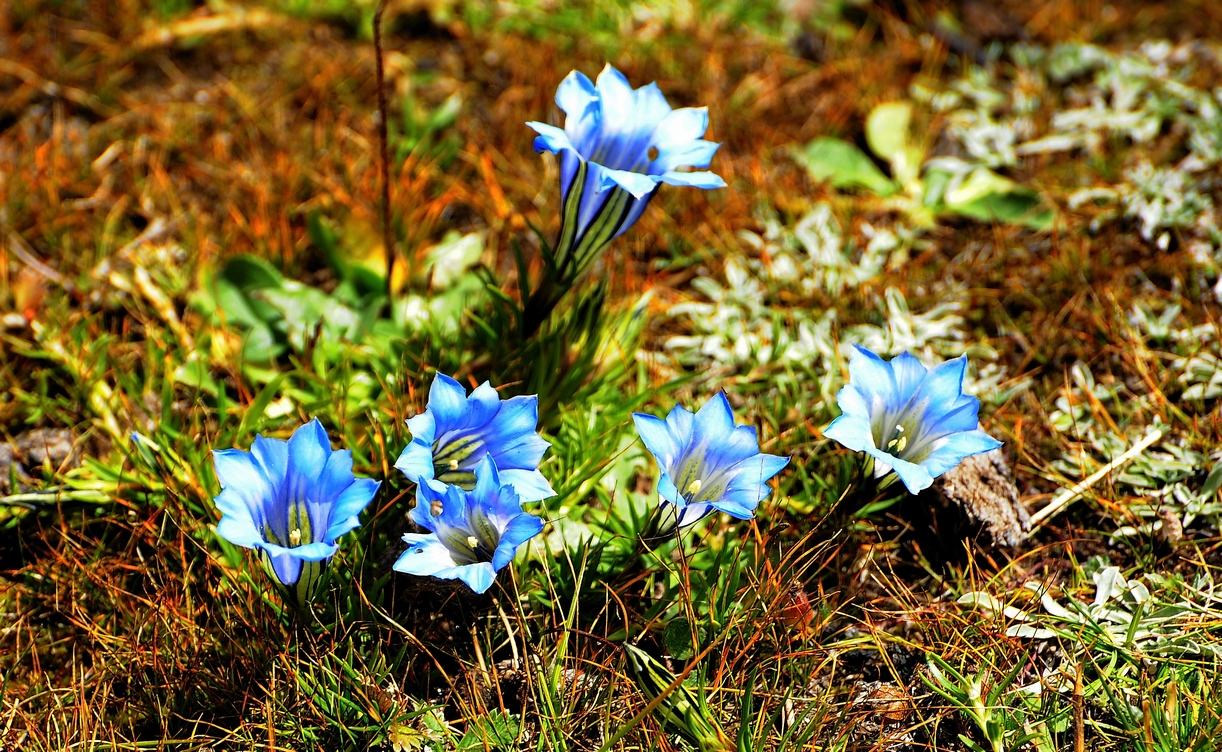

Scientific classification
- Kingdom: Plantae
- Clade: Tracheophytes
- Clade: Angiosperms
- Clade: Eudicots
- Clade: Asterids
- Order: Gentianales
- Family: Gentianaceae
- Genus: Gentiana
- Species: G. sino-ornata

Binomial name
- Gentiana sino-ornata Balf.f.

Synonyms
- Gentianodes sino-ornata (Balf.f.) Á.Löve & D.Löve

= Gentiana sino-ornata =

Species of plant

Gentiana sino-ornata, the showy Chinese gentian, is a species of flowering plant in the family Gentianaceae, native to western China and Tibet. It is a low-growing semi-evergreen perennial growing to 5–7 cm (2–3 in) tall, with multiple prostrate stems 15–30 cm (6–12 in) long, bearing single trumpet-shaped flowers of a pure blue with a white- and green-striped throat, in autumn.

In cultivation it is hardy down to −10 °C (14 °F), but requires a well-drained soil with an acid or neutral pH. It is suitable for growing in a rock or alpine garden. This plant has gained the Royal Horticultural Society's Award of Garden Merit.
