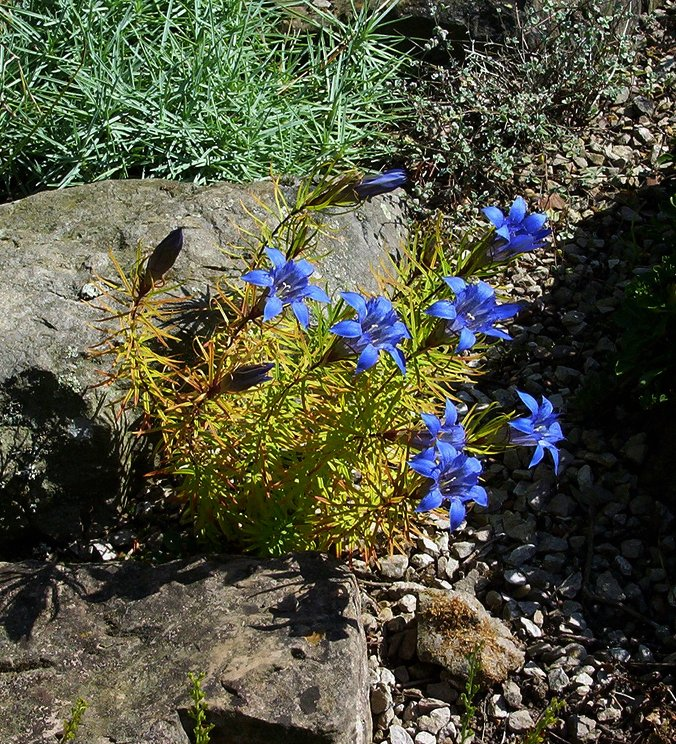

Scientific classification
- Kingdom: Plantae
- Clade: Tracheophytes
- Clade: Angiosperms
- Clade: Eudicots
- Clade: Asterids
- Order: Gentianales
- Family: Gentianaceae
- Genus: Gentiana
- Species: G. paradoxa

Binomial name
- Gentiana paradoxa Albov

= Gentiana paradoxa =

Species of plant

Gentiana paradoxa, the Caucasian gentian, is a species of flowering plant in the family Gentianaceae, endemic to the foothills of the Greater Caucasus Mountains in western Asia, near the Black Sea. A compact, mat-forming herbaceous perennial growing to 20 cm (7.9 in) tall and wide, its upright stems of grass-like, linear or lanceolate leaves bear clusters of 5 or 6 large, brilliant blue and white flowers in late summer. It is one of several species of gentians that are valued in cultivation for the unusual bright blue colour of their blooms. However, it is not particularly easy to grow, requiring moist, well-drained, lime-free soil and a position in full sun. It is quite rare in nature.

This plant has gained the Royal Horticultural Society's Award of Garden Merit.

== Gallery ==
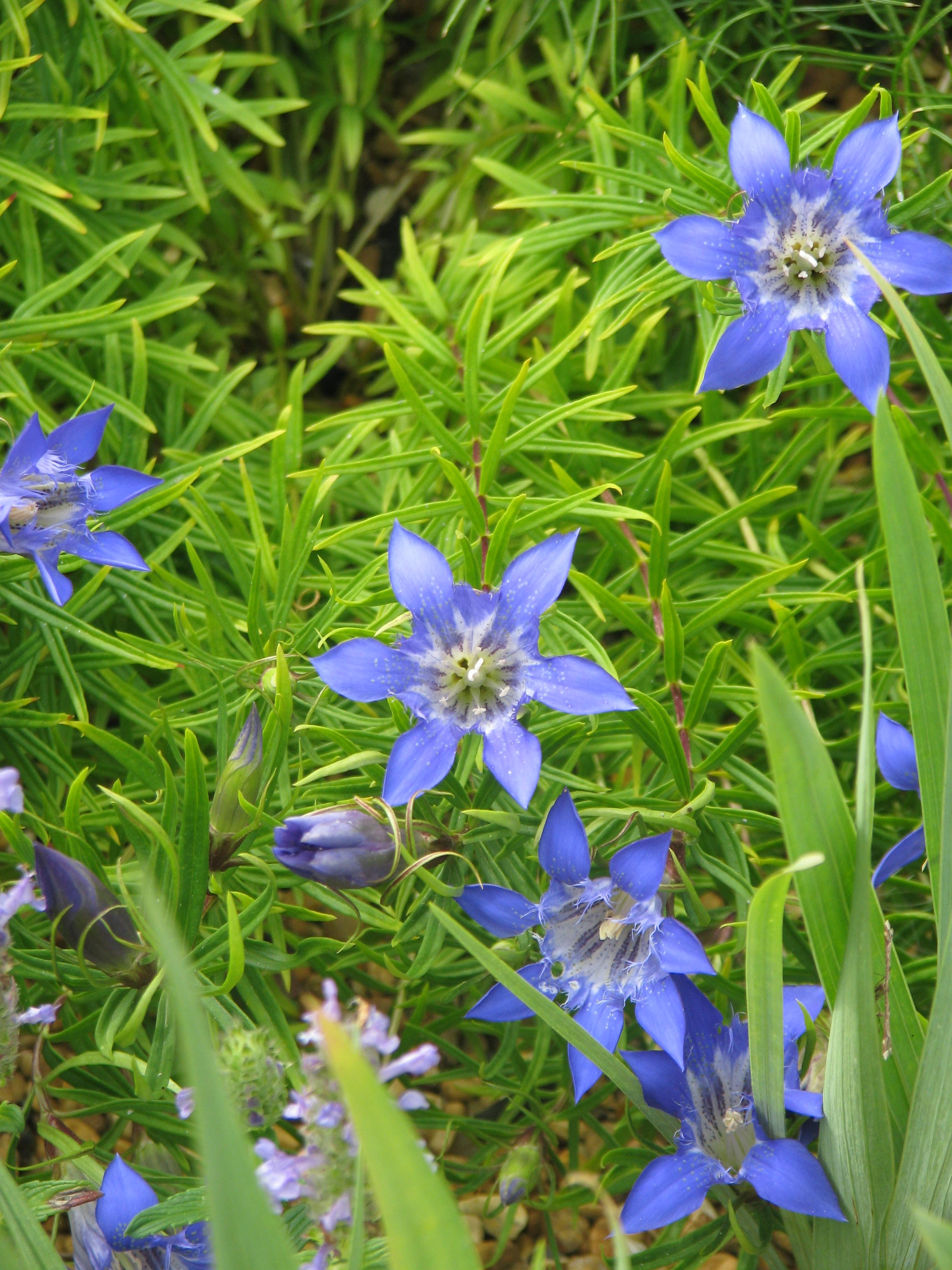

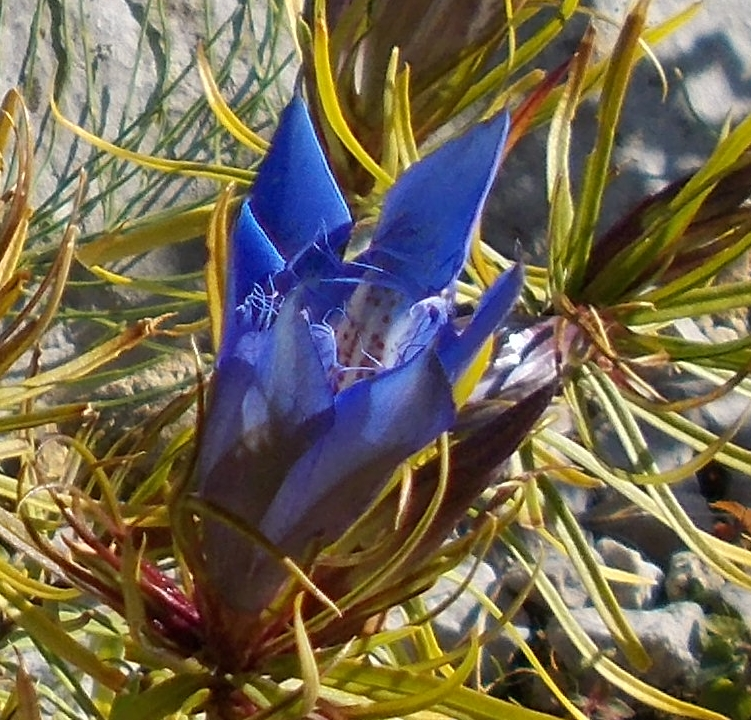
Viote Alpine Botanical Garden

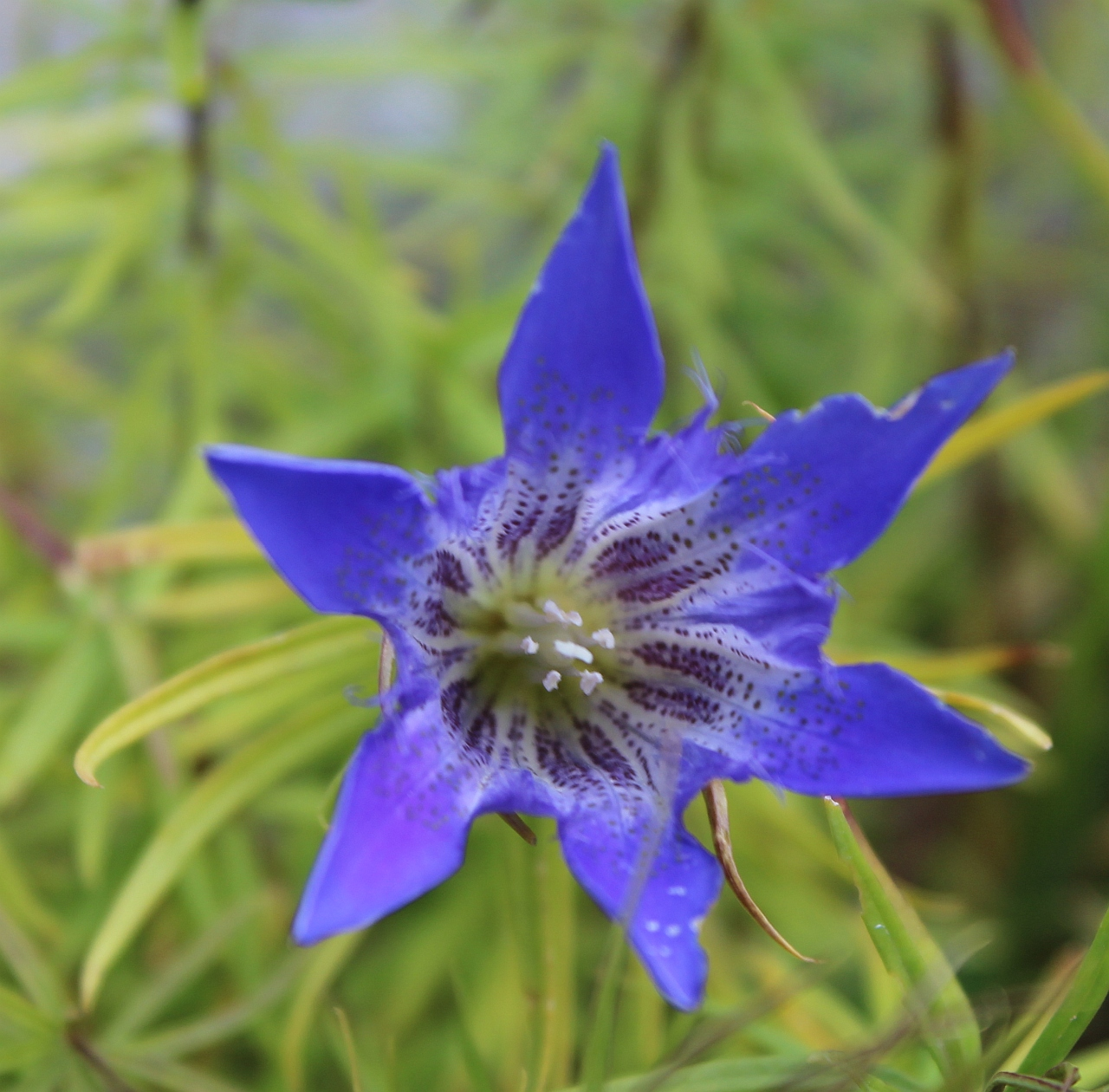
