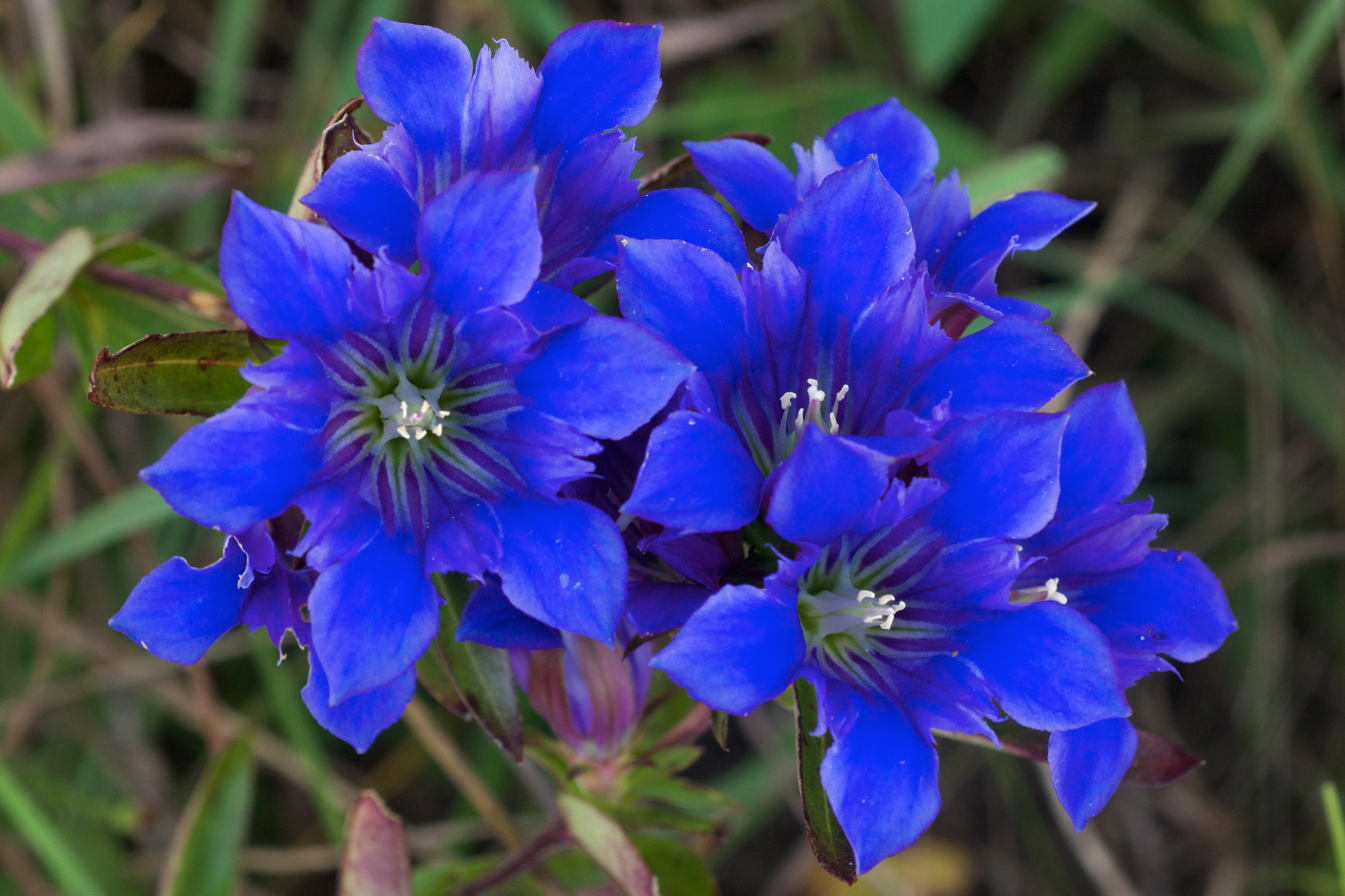

Scientific classification
- Kingdom: Plantae
- Clade: Tracheophytes
- Clade: Angiosperms
- Clade: Eudicots
- Clade: Asterids
- Order: Gentianales
- Family: Gentianaceae
- Genus: Gentiana
- Species: G. puberulenta

Binomial name
- Gentiana puberulenta J.Pringle

= Gentiana puberulenta =

Species of plant

Gentiana puberulenta, the downy gentian or prairie gentian. is a branchless perennial plant of the Gentianaceae family native to North America. It is about ¾–1½' tall, with bright blue to deep blue-violet bell-shaped, upright, five-lobed flowers measuring 1½ to 2¼ inches across when fully open. Flowers grow in clusters of 1–8 at the apex of the plant. Lanceolate, sessile, glossy leaves up to 3" long and 1¼" across are arranged oppositely along the central stem, except at the apex where they grow in whorls of 3–7. Gentiana puberulenta grows in dry upland prairies and woods and rocky open slopes.
