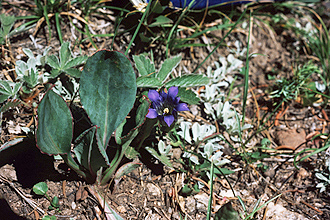

Conservation status
- Secure (NatureServe)

Scientific classification
- Kingdom: Plantae
- Clade: Tracheophytes
- Clade: Angiosperms
- Clade: Eudicots
- Clade: Asterids
- Order: Gentianales
- Family: Gentianaceae
- Genus: Gentiana
- Species: G. parryi

Binomial name
- Gentiana parryi Engelm.

Synonyms
- List: Dasystephana parryi (Engelm.) Rydb. (1906); Gentiana bracteosa Greene (1900); Gentiana parryi var. bracteosa A.Nelson (1909); Pneumonanthe bracteosa (Greene) Greene (1904); Pneumonanthe parryi (Engelm.) Greene (1904)

= Gentiana parryi =

Plant species in the gentian family

Gentiana parryi, or Parry's gentian, is a species of the genus Gentiana. It is a perennial forb/herb native to Wyoming, Utah, Colorado and New Mexico.
