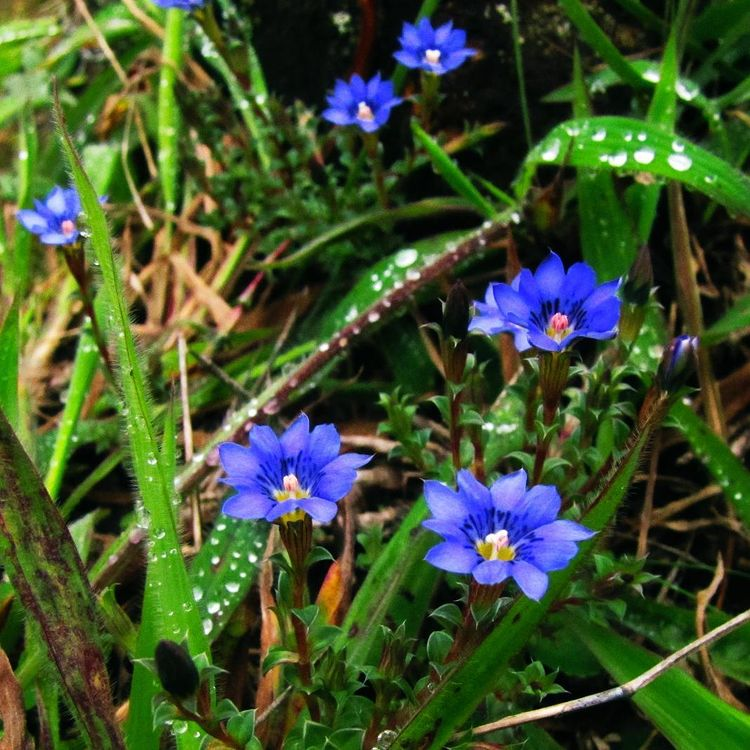

Scientific classification
- Kingdom: Plantae
- Clade: Tracheophytes
- Clade: Angiosperms
- Clade: Eudicots
- Clade: Asterids
- Order: Gentianales
- Family: Gentianaceae
- Genus: Gentiana
- Species: G. pedicellata

Binomial name
- Gentiana pedicellata (D.Don) Griseb.

= Gentiana pedicellata =

Species of plant

Gentiana pedicellata, the purple stalked gentian, is a plant that belongs to the genus Gentiana.

== Description ==
It grows to a maximum height of 8 cm (3.1 in) and bears small blue flowers at the end of lateral branches in January-June, in Indian climatic conditions.

Flowers are 6 to 8 mm (0.24 to 0.31 in) long, pale blue, with shallow-triangular petals, and shorter lobules between them. Leaves are lance-shaped, 5–20 mm long; the basal leaves, when present, are much larger and broader. Purple stalked gentian is found in the Himalayas, from Pakistan to Myanmar, the Nilgiri Mountains and China at altitudes of 750–3800 m. Its habitats include bogs, meadows, and roadside slopes.
