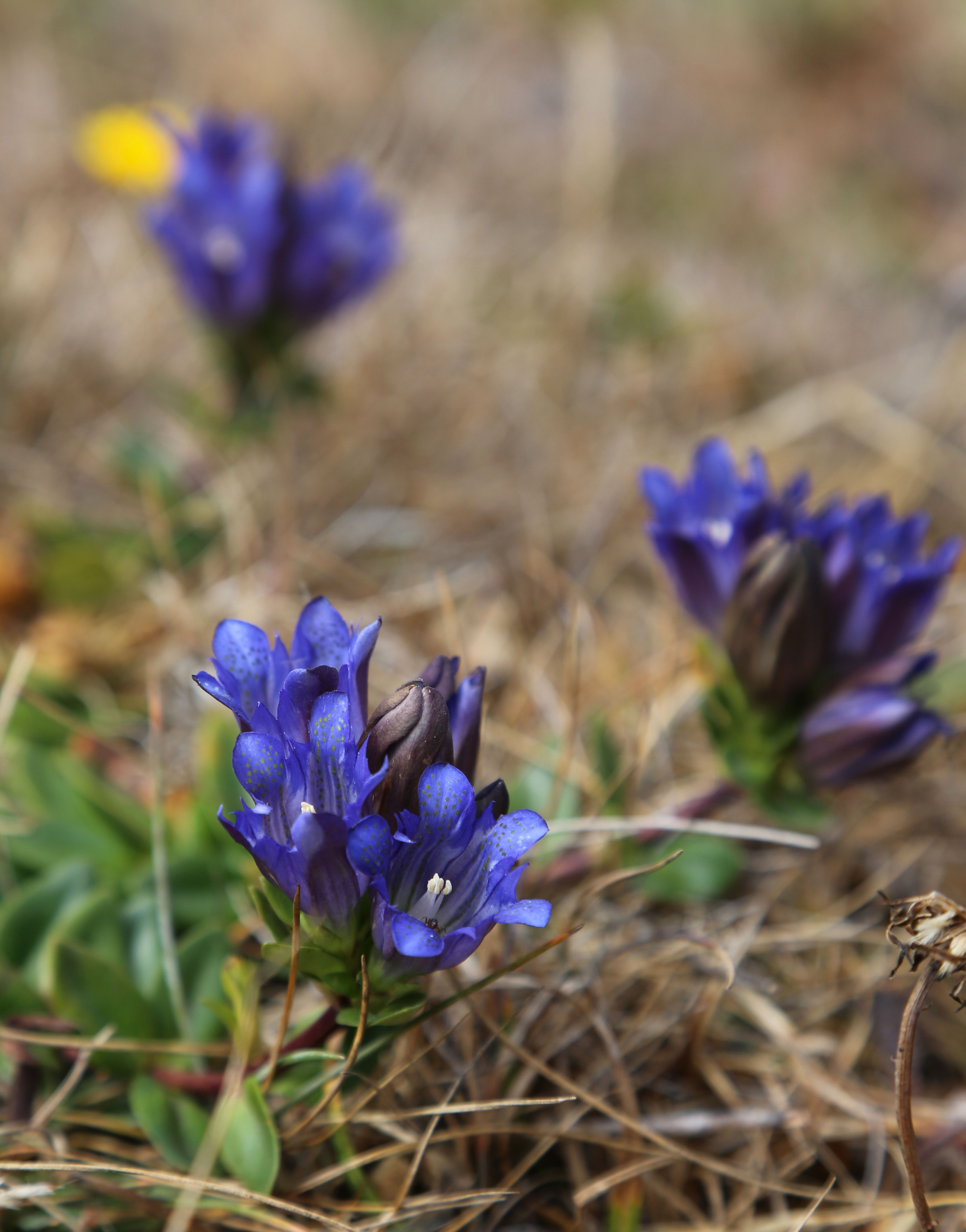

Conservation status
- Imperiled (NatureServe)

Scientific classification
- Kingdom: Plantae
- Clade: Tracheophytes
- Clade: Angiosperms
- Clade: Eudicots
- Clade: Asterids
- Order: Gentianales
- Family: Gentianaceae
- Genus: Gentiana
- Species: G. setigera

Binomial name
- Gentiana setigera A.Gray

Synonyms
- Gentiana bisetaea

= Gentiana setigera =

Species of plant

Gentiana setigera is a species of gentian known by the common name Mendocino gentian. It is native to southern Oregon and northern California where it grows in wet places in the California Coast Ranges. It grows in serpentine soils.

== Description ==
This is a low perennial herb with stems running along the ground and reaching up to about 40 centimeters in length. Leaves are spoon-shaped near the base and oval-shaped and paired further along the stem.

Flowers appear singly or in inflorescences of a few flowers. Each flower is bell-shaped and bright blue with a speckled white center. The four to five lobes of the corolla are diamond-shaped and between them are sinus appendages that end in thready projections. The fruit is a capsule containing winged seeds.
