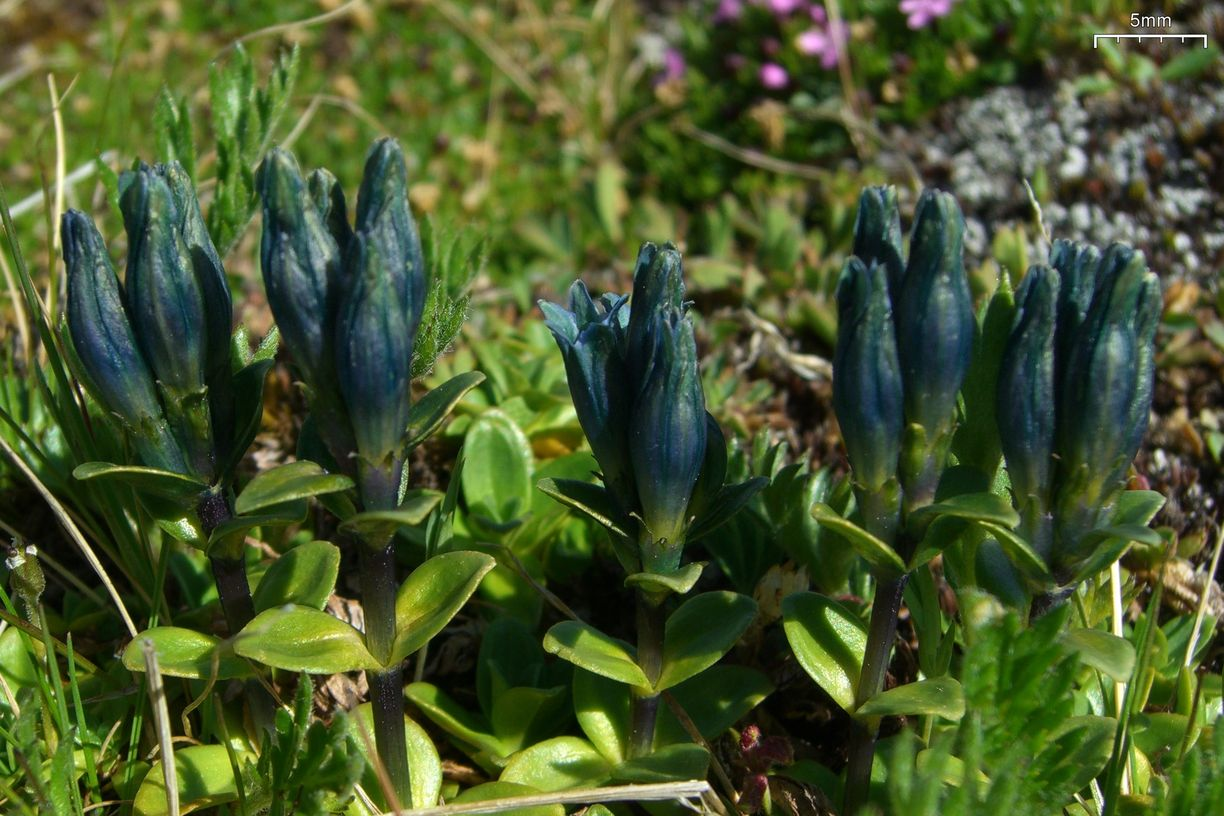

Conservation status
- Apparently Secure (NatureServe)

Scientific classification
- Kingdom: Plantae
- Clade: Tracheophytes
- Clade: Angiosperms
- Clade: Eudicots
- Clade: Asterids
- Order: Gentianales
- Family: Gentianaceae
- Genus: Gentiana
- Species: G. glauca

Binomial name
- Gentiana glauca Pall.

= Gentiana glauca =

Species of plant

Gentiana glauca is a species of flowering plant in the gentian family known by the common names pale gentian and glaucous gentian. It is native to eastern Asia and northwestern North America from Alaska and the Northwest Territories to Washington and Montana.

This perennial herb produces a basal rosette of oval leaves each 1–2 cm (0.39–0.79 in) long from a rhizome. Leaves on the stem are oppositely arranged, in pairs of 2–4, and 5–10 mm long. The stem grows to a maximum height near 15 cm (5.9 in).

The inflorescence is a cluster of three to five blue or blue-green flowers up to 2 cm (0.79 in) long. The inflorescence appears in small cymes of 2-5 flowers near the apex of the stem. The calyxes are 5–7 mm, with a narrow corolla. Reported pollinators include many bee species, such as Bombus appositus, Bombus fervidus, Bombus flavifrons, Bombus sylvicola, Bombus pensylvanicus, and Bombus kirbiellus.

The plant reproduces sexually by seed and spreads vegetatively by sprouting from its rhizome. Seeds are contained in tubular capsule, 1-celled, 2-valved fruits. Seeds weigh about 0.12 g with a length of 0.7–1.0 cm.

This plant grows on tundra and in a variety of other moist, treeless habitat types. It occurs in subalpine and alpine climates, with a growing season typically lasting from July to September. It occurs at elevations around 2,485 m (8,153 ft) in Montana and at least 1,500 m (4,900 ft) in Alaska.
