= Gentiana punctata =

Conservation status
- Least Concern (IUCN 3.1)

Scientific classification
- Kingdom: Plantae
- Clade: Tracheophytes
- Clade: Angiosperms
- Clade: Eudicots
- Clade: Asterids
- Order: Gentianales
- Family: Gentianaceae
- Genus: Gentiana
- Species: G. punctata

Binomial name
- Gentiana punctata L.

Species of plant

Gentiana punctata, the spotted gentian, is a least concern herbaceous species of flowering plant in the gentian family Gentianaceae. It grows in Central and Southeastern Europe at altitudes 1.500−2.600 meters. It is 20−60 cm tall.
