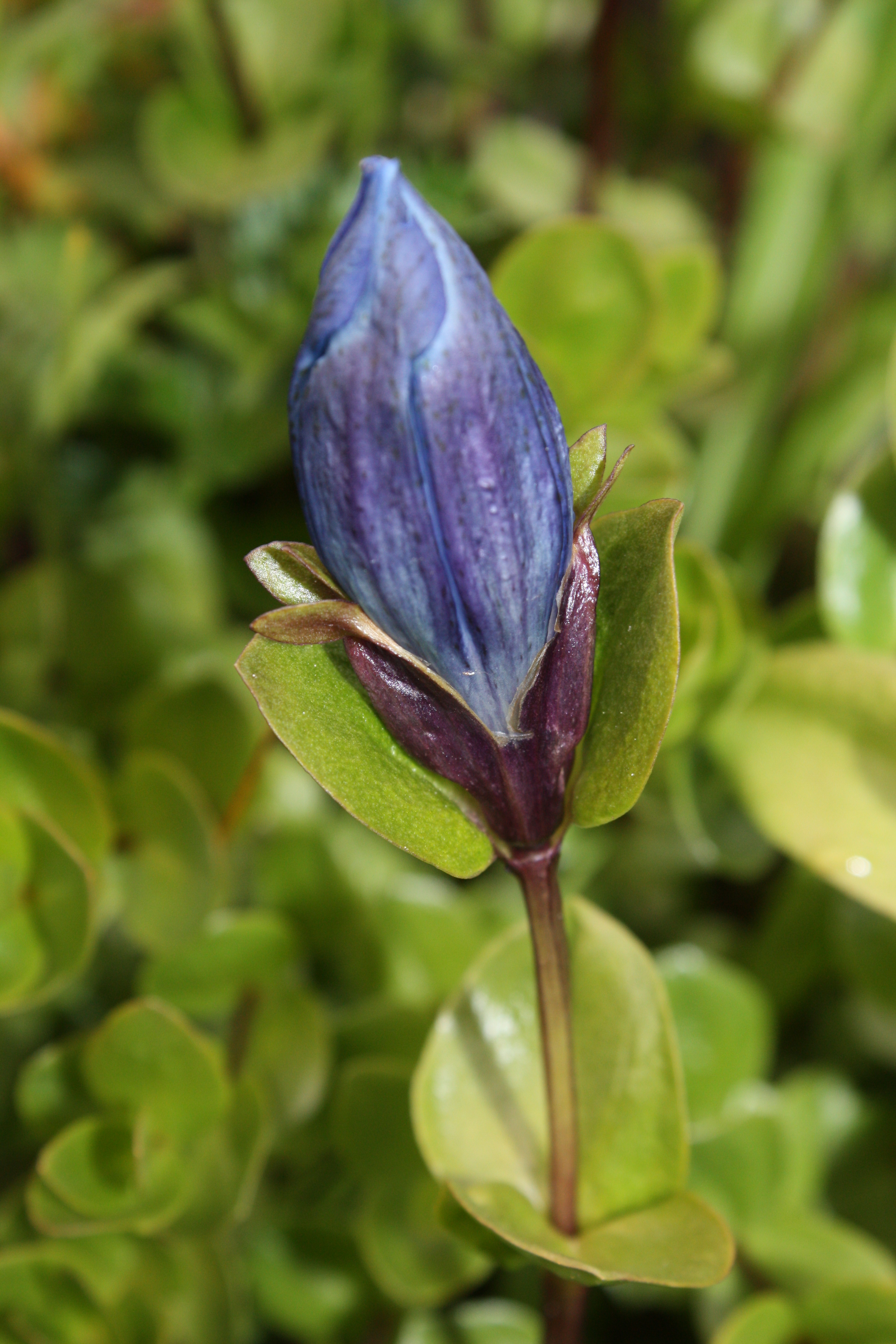

Scientific classification
- Kingdom: Plantae
- Clade: Tracheophytes
- Clade: Angiosperms
- Clade: Eudicots
- Clade: Asterids
- Order: Gentianales
- Family: Gentianaceae
- Genus: Gentiana
- Species: G. calycosa

Binomial name
- Gentiana calycosa Griseb.

Synonyms
- Dasystephana calycosa (Griseb.) Rydb.; Gentiana calycosa subsp. typica Maguire; Pneumonanthe calycosa (Griseb.) Greene; Dasystephana calycosa var. xantha (A.Nelson) A.Nelson; Dasystephana monticola (Rydb.) Rydb.; Dasystephana obtusiloba Rydb.; Gentiana calycosa f. alpina Herder; Gentiana calycosa var. asepala (Maguire) C.L.Hitchc.; Gentiana calycosa subsp. asepala Maguire; Gentiana calycosa var. monticola Rydb.; Gentiana calycosa var. obtusiloba (Rydb.) C.L.Hitchc.; Gentiana calycosa var. stricta Griseb.; Gentiana calycosa var. xantha A.Nelson; Gentiana cusickii Gand.; Gentiana gormanii Howell; Gentiana idahoensis Gand.; Gentiana myrsinites Gand.; Gentiana obtusiloba (Rydb.) Hultén; Gentiana saxicola English

= Gentiana calycosa =

Species of plant

Gentiana calycosa is a species of flowering plant in the family Gentianaceae. It is a herbaceous perennial gentian known by the common names explorer's gentian, Rainier pleated gentian, and mountain bog gentian.

== Description ==
The flower of Gentiana calycosa is a funnel-shaped cup opening into a five-petaled face 3 to 5 centimeters (1.2 to 2.0 in) wide, in shades of deep blue to purple. The plant has hardy, thick green leaves on the thin red stems from which the flowers are borne.

== Distribution and habitat ==
It is native to the mid-elevation mountains of the western United States and Canada from the Sierra Nevada of California to the Canadian Cascades. It grows in a variety of habitats, including rocky slopes, wet meadows, and seeps.

== Cultivation ==
Like other gentians, G. calycosa is an attractive mountain wildflower good for use in alpine gardens, but it may be difficult to grow, preferring rocky soils that are moist.
