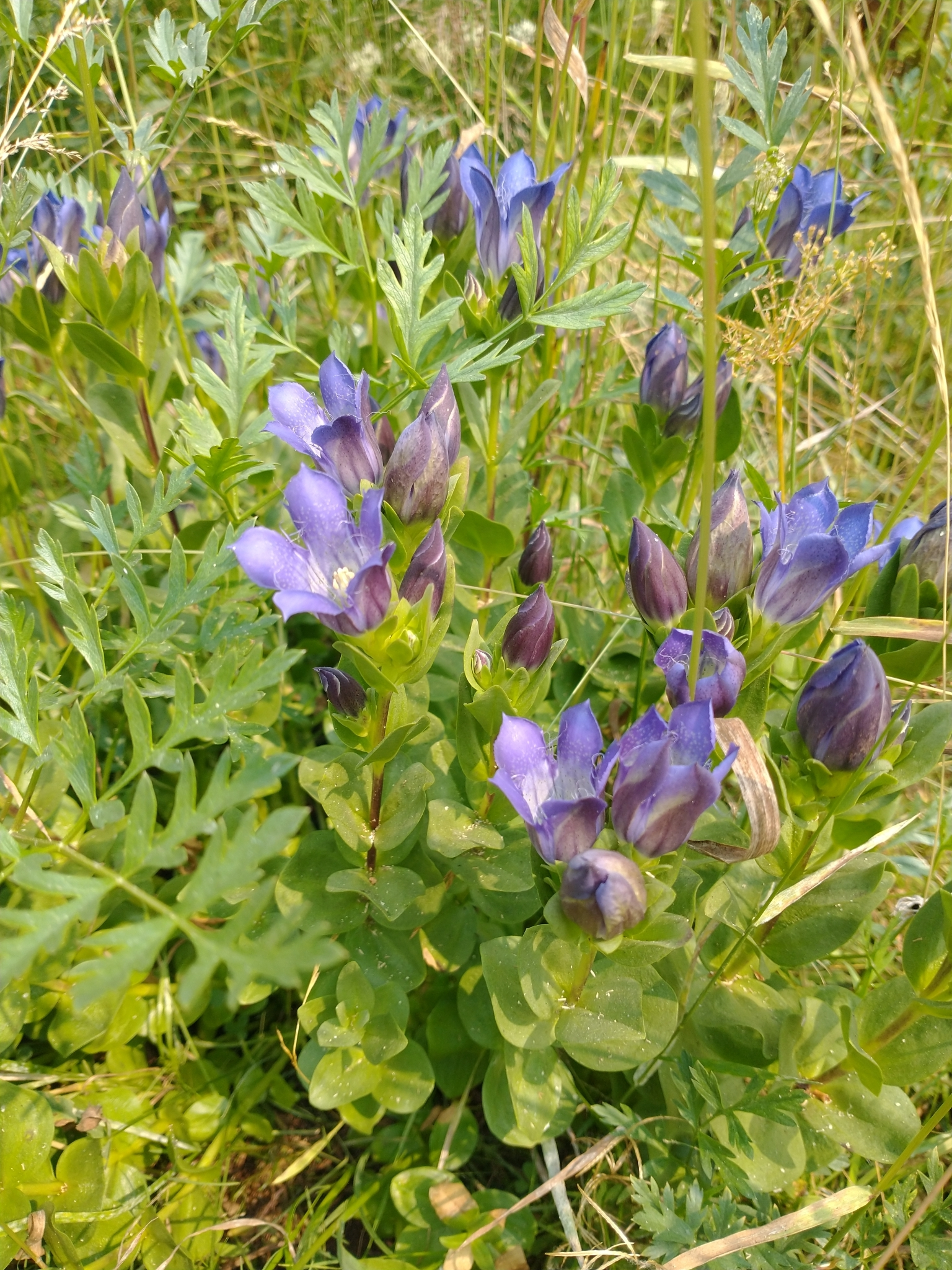

Conservation status
- Imperiled (NatureServe)

Scientific classification
- Kingdom: Plantae
- Clade: Tracheophytes
- Clade: Angiosperms
- Clade: Eudicots
- Clade: Asterids
- Order: Gentianales
- Family: Gentianaceae
- Genus: Gentiana
- Species: G. plurisetosa

Binomial name
- Gentiana plurisetosa C.T.Mason

= Gentiana plurisetosa =

Species of plant

Gentiana plurisetosa is a rare species of Gentiana, known by the common names Klamath gentian and bristly gentian.

It is native to southern Oregon and northern California, where it is an uncommon resident of wet mountain habitat.

This is a perennial herb growing two or more stems which may lie close to the ground or grow erect up to 40 centimetres. Leaves are distributed evenly along the stems and are generally round to oval-shaped and sometimes pointed, up to six centimeters long and half as wide.

Flowers are solitary or appear in bunched inflorescences of up to five. Each flower is bright deep blue, up to 5 centimetres long and 3 wide at the mouth, with frilly, thready corolla lobes. The fruit is a capsule containing winged seeds.
