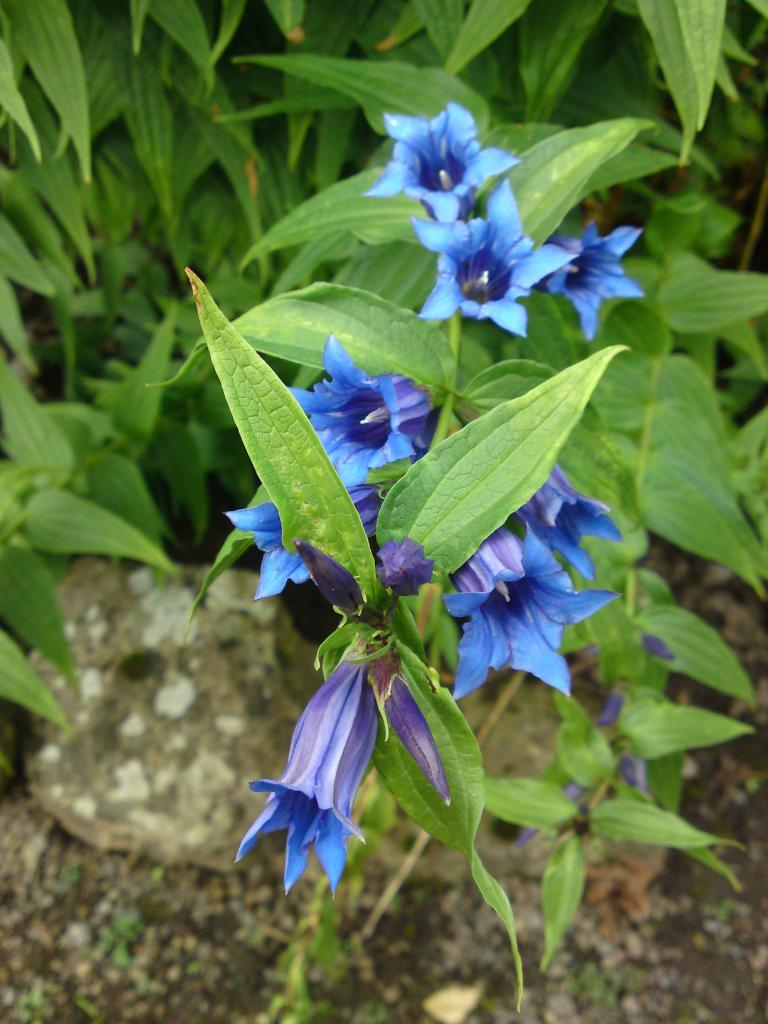

Scientific classification
- Kingdom: Plantae
- Clade: Tracheophytes
- Clade: Angiosperms
- Clade: Eudicots
- Clade: Asterids
- Order: Gentianales
- Family: Gentianaceae
- Genus: Gentiana
- Species: G. asclepiadea

Binomial name
- Gentiana asclepiadea L.

= Gentiana asclepiadea =

Species of plant

Gentiana asclepiadea, the willow gentian, is a species of flowering plant of the genus Gentiana in the family Gentianaceae, native to central and eastern Europe. It occurs primarily in mountain (montane) woodland, though it may be found in less wooded open pasture in some areas, perhaps persisting after woodland clearance.

One of the larger species within the genus, it produces pairs of leaves, sometimes whorled in threes or fours around particularly vigorous shoots on stems that generally arch elegantly outward from the base of the plant between 60–90 cm (2.0–3.0 ft) in length. Trumpet-shaped, deep blue flowers occur in late summer into autumn.

Like many members of the genus and the family Gentianaceae, the roots have a close association with certain fungi in a similar way to the Orchidaceae and Ericaceae, though completely unrelated to both of these families. This particular species is relatively easy to grow in most garden situations as long as it has plenty of organic material added to the soil.

Gentiana asclepiadea likes moist, rich, well-drained soil in full sun or partial shade. The plant can be divided after flowering, however it rarely needs this. Propagate by seed sown as soon as the seed is ripe into a cold frame. If sowing the seed indoors then cold treatment is needed.

This plant is susceptible to spider mites, slugs, snails and aphids.

Gentiana asclepiadea has gained the Royal Horticultural Society's Award of Garden Merit.
