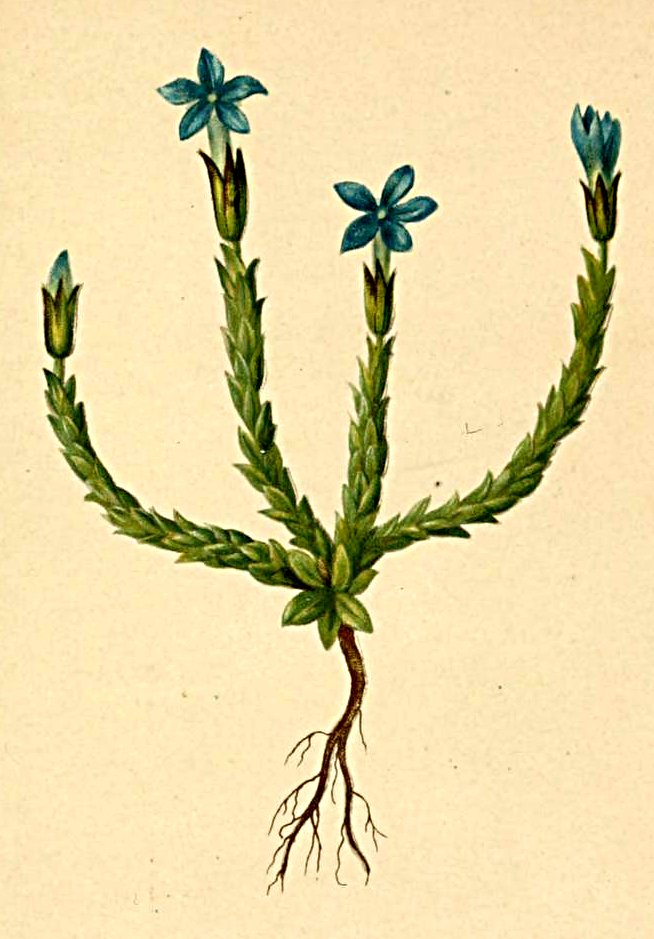

Conservation status
- Secure (NatureServe)

Scientific classification
- Kingdom: Plantae
- Clade: Tracheophytes
- Clade: Angiosperms
- Clade: Eudicots
- Clade: Asterids
- Order: Gentianales
- Family: Gentianaceae
- Genus: Gentiana
- Species: G. prostrata

Binomial name
- Gentiana prostrata Haenke

Varieties and subspecies
- Gentiana prostrata var. crenulatotruncata C.Marquand; Gentiana prostrata var. karelinii (Griseb.) Kusn.; Gentiana prostrata var. ludlowii (C.Marquand) T.N.Ho; Gentiana prostrata subsp. nutans (Bunge) Halda; Gentiana prostrata subsp. prostrata; Gentiana prostrata var. pudica (Maxim.) Kusn.

Synonyms
- List: Chondrophylla prostrata (Haenke) J.P.Anderson (1918); Ciminalis prostrata (Haenke) Á.Löve & D.Löve 1976); Ericoila prostrata (Haenke) Borkh. (1796); Gentiana prostrata var. typica Hauman (1918); Varasia prostrata (Haenke) Soják (1979)

= Gentiana prostrata =

Plant species in the gentian family

Gentiana prostrata, commonly known as pygmy gentian, moss gentian, or gentiane penchée, is a species of plant in the family Gentianaceae. It is widely distributed across Eurasia, North America, and South America.

== Distribution and habitat ==
In North America, G. prostrata can be found in western Canada (Alberta, British Columbia, the Northwest Territories, and Yukon) and the western United States (Alaska, California, Colorado, Idaho, Montana, Nevada, Oregon, Utah, and Wyoming). It occurs in bogs and moist meadows in subalpine and alpine areas.

== Description ==
Gentiana prostrata is a small annual or biennial herb. The stem may be erect or prostrate. The leaves are small, pointed, and oval in shape. Single blue flowers are borne at the end of erect stems, and close up when shaded or touched.
