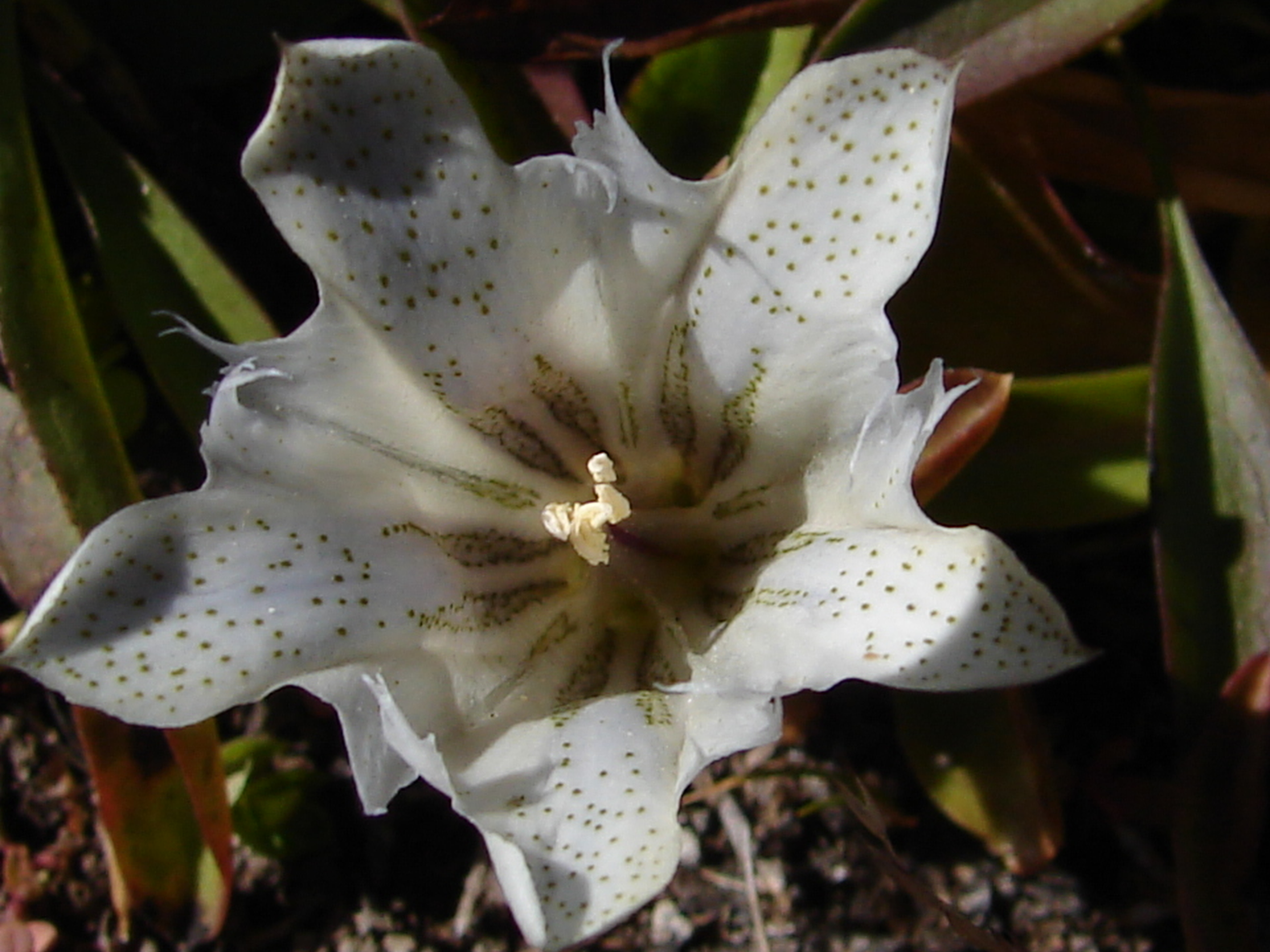

Scientific classification
- Kingdom: Plantae
- Clade: Tracheophytes
- Clade: Angiosperms
- Clade: Eudicots
- Clade: Asterids
- Order: Gentianales
- Family: Gentianaceae
- Genus: Gentiana
- Species: G. newberryi

Binomial name
- Gentiana newberryi Gray

= Gentiana newberryi =

Species of plant

Gentiana newberryi is a species of gentian known by the common names alpine gentian and Newberry's gentian. It is a perennial herb found in western North America.

== Distribution ==
The plant is native to California and Oregon. Its habitat is wet mountain meadows.

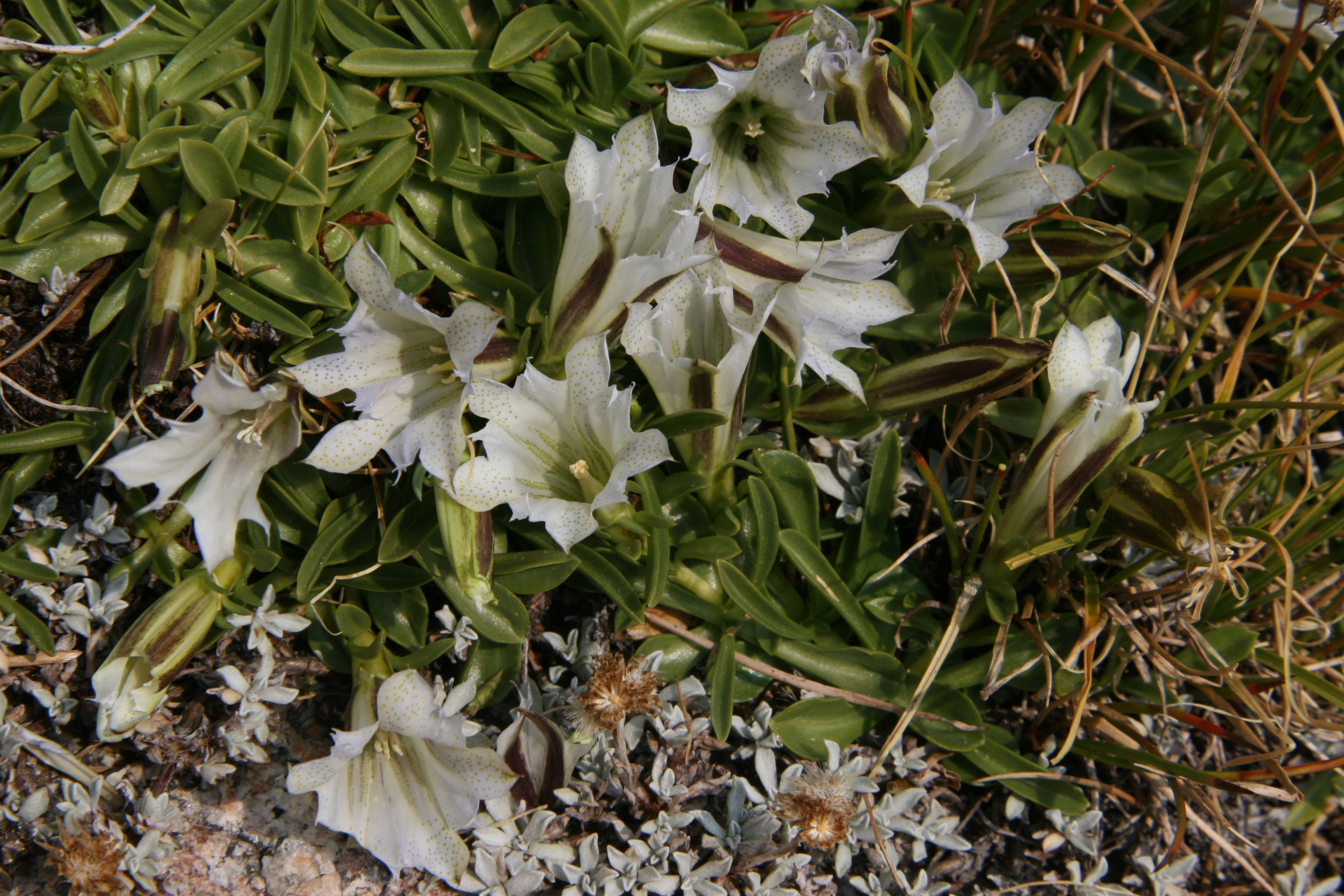
Gentiana newberryi var. Tiogana, in Yosemite National Park.

== Description ==
Gentiana newberryi is a small perennial herb growing short stems which lie against the ground or snake through the grass.

The curving leaves are lance-shaped to spoon-shaped. The foliage is green and may have purple coloration along the edges and tips.

Flowers are solitary or come in inflorescences of up to five. Each flower is trumpet-shaped and up to 5 or 6 centimeters long, and 3 centimeters wide at the mouth. The lobes of the flower corolla have rounded to slightly pointed tips. Between each of the five lobes is a sinus appendage which comes to a very sharp point and twists into a thread. The outer surface of the mainly white flower is sharply striped with light to deep blue. The inner surface may be lightly striped with greenish or yellowish coloration, and freckled with a similar color.

The fruit is a capsule containing winged seeds.
