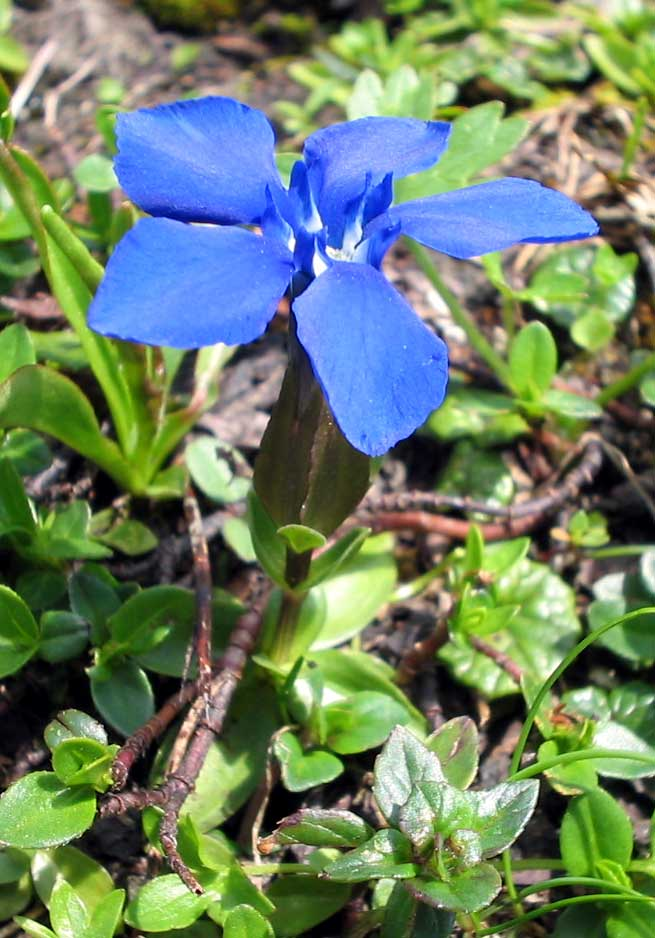
- Gentiana verna

Scientific classification
- Kingdom: Plantae
- Clade: Tracheophytes
- Clade: Angiosperms
- Clade: Eudicots
- Clade: Asterids
- Order: Gentianales
- Family: Gentianaceae
- Tribe: Gentianeae
- Subtribe: Gentianinae
- Genus: Gentiana; L.

Type species
- Gentiana lutea L.

Species
- See text

Synonyms
- List: Aloitis Raf.; Anthopogon Neck.; Asterias Borkh.; Bilamista Raf.; Calathiana Delarbre; Chaelothilus Neck.; Chiophila Raf.; Chondrophylla A.Nelson; Ciminalis Adans.; Coilantha Borkh.; Cruciata Gilib.; Cuttera Raf.; Dasistepha Raf.; Dasystephana Adans.; Dicardiotis Raf.; Diploma Raf.; Endotriche Steud.; Ericala Reneaulme ex Gray; Ericoila Reneaulme ex Borkh.; Favargera Á.Löve & D.Löve; Gaertneria Neck.; Gentianodes Á.Löve & D.Löve; Gentianusa Pohl; Hippion F.W.Schmidt; Holubia Á.Löve & D.Löve; Holubogentia Á.Löve & D.Löve; Kudoa Masam.; Kuepferella M.Laínz; Kurramiana Omer & Qaiser; Lexipyretum Dulac; Pneumonanthe Gled.; Psalina Raf.; Qaisera Omer; Rassia Neck.; Ricoila Reneaulme ex Raf.; Sebeokia Neck.; Selatium D.Don ex G.Don; Spiragyne Neck.; Thylacitis Reneaulme ex Adans.; Thyrophora Neck.; Tretorhiza Adans.; Tretorrhiza Reneaulme ex Delarbre; Varasia Phil.; Xolemia Raf.

= Gentiana =

Genus of flowering plants

Gentiana (/ˌdʒɛntʃiˈeɪnə/) is a genus of flowering plants belonging to the gentian family (Gentianaceae), the tribe Gentianeae, and the monophyletic subtribe Gentianinae. With over 300 species, it is considered a large genus. Gentians are notable for their mostly large trumpet-shaped flowers, which are often of an intense blue hue, though some are also bright yellow. The type species of the genus is Gentiana lutea.

The genus name is a tribute to Gentius, an Illyrian king who may have discovered tonic properties in gentians.

== Habitat ==
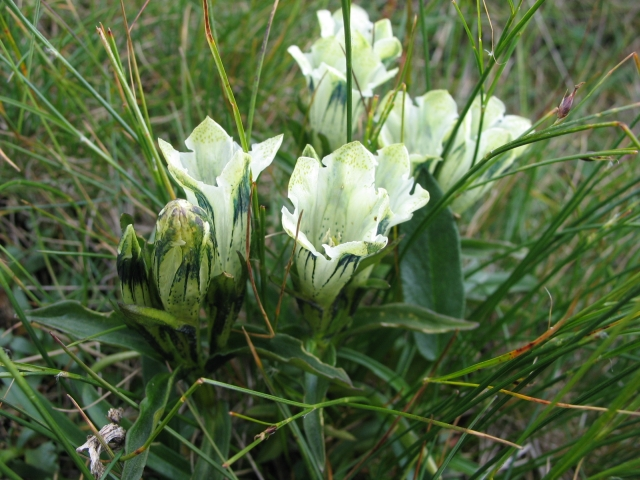
Gentiana frigida

Gentian is a cosmopolitan genus, occurring in alpine habitats in temperate regions of Asia, Europe and the Americas. Some species also occur in northwestern Africa, eastern Australia, and New Zealand. They are annual, biennial, and perennial plants. Some are evergreen, others are not.

Many gentians are difficult to grow outside their wild habitat, but several species are available in cultivation. Gentians are fully hardy and can grow in full sun or partial shade. They grow in well-drained, neutral-to-acid soils rich in humus. They are popular in rock gardens.

== Uses ==
Gentian is used in the manufacture of distilled beverages such as apéritifs, liqueurs, and tonics. Gentiana lutea is used to produce Gentian liqueur in the Alps and in the Auvergne.

Gentian root is a common beverage flavouring for bitters, and is used in the soft drink Moxie. The French apéritif Suze is made with gentian. Americano apéritifs contain gentian root for bitter flavoring. It is an ingredient in the Italian liqueur Aperol. It is also used as the main flavor in the German after-dinner digestif called Underberg, and the main ingredient in Angostura bitters and Peychaud's Bitters.

The principal bitter component of gentian root is gentiopicrin (also called gentiopicroside), a glycoside. A 2007 paper by a Japanese group identified 23 compounds in fresh gentian root. Gentiopicrin was absent from the fresh root, so it possibly developed during drying and storage of the root.

Gentian has had limited use in perfumery, most notably as a glycerine soap (Crabtree & Evelyn) and a perfume (Corday's Possession, 1937).

The young plant and old leaves of at least one species, Gentiana scabra, are edible when cooked and have historically been used as a famine food when other food sources were scarce.

=== Pharmacological uses ===
Great yellow gentian (Gentiana lutea) is used in herbal medicine for digestive problems, fever, hypertension, muscle spasms, parasitic worms, wounds, cancer, sinusitis, and malaria, although studies have shown minimal efficacy beyond that of a placebo with regard to the treatment of anxiety and ADHD in children. Gentian has been shown to manage dyspepsia by eliciting cephalic responses that increase vascular resistance and reduce the workload of the heart during digestion.

Gentiana punctata leaves and roots have been used in traditional Austrian medicine internally and externally as liqueur or tea for disorders of the gastrointestinal tract, skin, locomotor system, liver, and bile, and for pediatric problems, fever, flu, rheumatism, and gout.

Gentiana purpurea, Gentiana punctata, and Gentiana pannonica are used to produce gentian schnapps, traditionally used as a digestive aid. In Ayurvedic medicine the endangered Indian gentian Gentiana kurroo has been used as a medical herb, but has been replaced with the Himalayan plant Picrorhiza kurroa, or Picrorhiza scrophulariiflora from traditional Chinese medicine.

=== Symbolism ===
Coat of arms of the German-speaking Community of Belgium

The emblem of the Minamoto clan

The gentian flower was used as the emblem of the Minamoto clan, one of the four great clans that dominated Japanese politics during the Heian period and went on to establish the first Shogunate in the aftermath of the Genpei War. It is the official flower (called Enzian) of the German-speaking community of Belgium.

== Species ==
=== General ===
Gentians have oppositely arranged leaves, sometimes in a basal rosette. The trumpet-shaped flowers are usually deep blue or azure but can be white, cream, yellow, or red. Many species are polymorphic concerning flower color, bearing flowers of different colors. Blue-flowered species predominate in the Northern Hemisphere, with red-flowered species dominant in the Andes, where bird pollination is probably more often favored by natural selection. White-flowered species are scattered throughout the range of the genus but dominate in New Zealand. Most flowers are pentamerous, with five lobes in the corolla and five sepals. A few species have four to seven flower parts. The corolla has folds called plicae between the lobes. The style is short or absent. The ovary is mostly sessile and has nectary glands.

=== List of accepted species ===
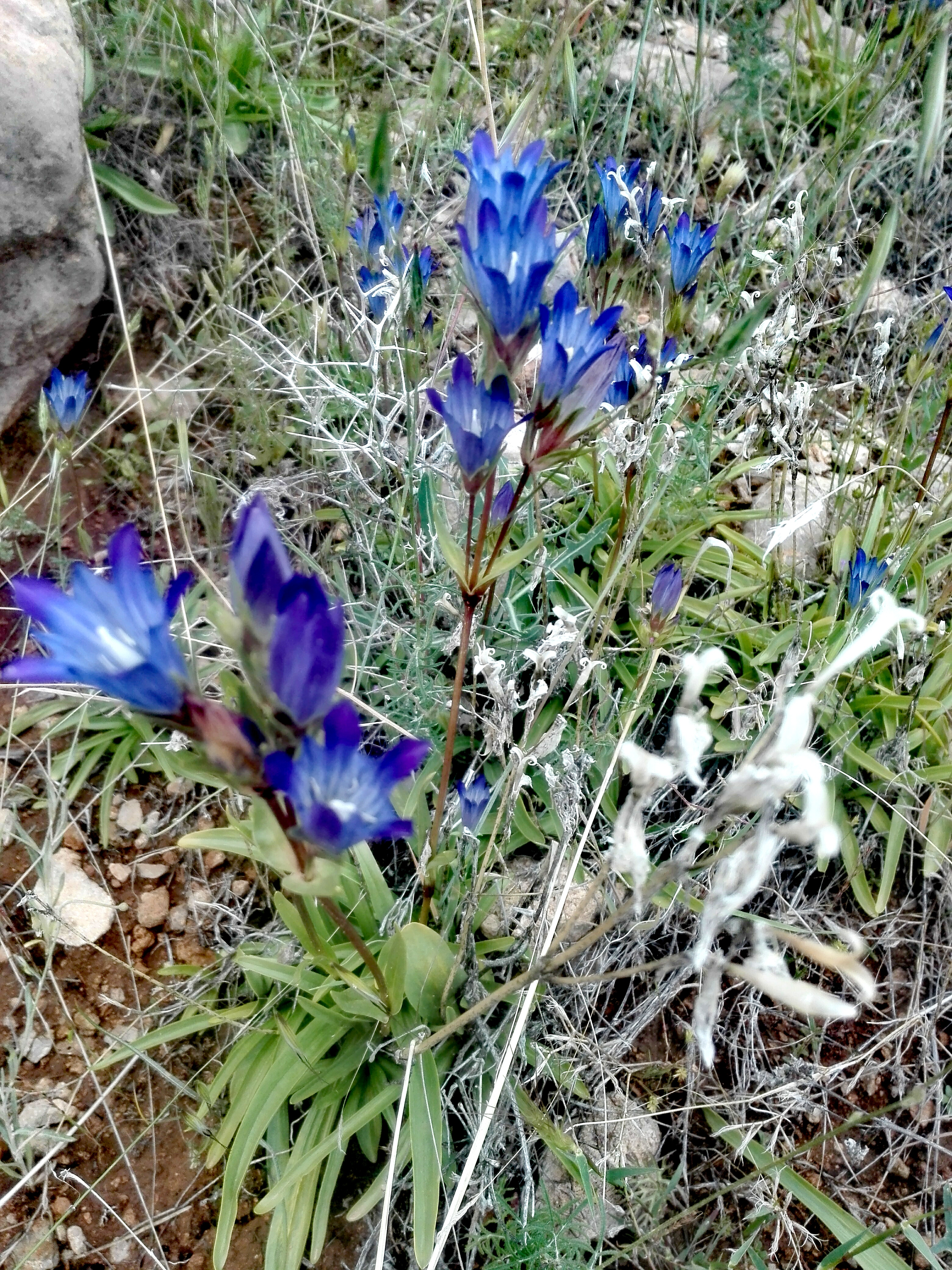
Gentiana olivieri - Fars province of Iran

The following species are recognised in the genus Gentiana:

- Gentiana acaulis L. – stemless gentian
- Gentiana affinis Griseb. – pleated gentian
- Gentiana alba Muhl. ex J.McNab – pleated gentian
- Gentiana albescens (Franch.) Franch. ex Kusn.
- Gentiana albicalyx Burkill
- Gentiana algida Pall. – whitish gentian
- Gentiana alii (Omer & Qaiser) T.N.Ho
- Gentiana alpina Vill. – alpine gentian
- Gentiana alsinoides Franch.
- Gentiana altigena Harry Sm.
- Gentiana altorum Harry Sm. ex C.Marquand
- Gentiana × ambigua Hayek
- Gentiana amplicrater Burkill
- Gentiana andrewsii Griseb. – closed bottle gentian
- Gentiana angustifolia Vill.
- Gentiana anisostemon C.Marquand
- Gentiana aperta Maxim.
- Gentiana apiata N.E.Br.
- Gentiana aquatica L.
- Gentiana arenicola Kerr
- Gentiana arethusae Burkill
- Gentiana argentea (Royle ex D.Don) Royle ex D.Don
- Gentiana arisanensis Hayata
- Gentiana aristata Maxim.
- Gentiana arunii D.Maity, S.K.Dey, J.Ghosh & Midday
- Gentiana asclepiadea L. – willow gentian
- Gentiana asterocalyx Diels
- Gentiana atlantica Litard. & Maire
- Gentiana atuntsiensis W.W.Sm.
- Gentiana austromontana J.S.Pringle & Sharp – Appalachian gentian
- Gentiana autumnalis L. – pinebarren gentian
- Gentiana baeuerlenii L.G.Adams - N.S.W
- Gentiana bambuseti T.Y.Hsieh, T.C.Hsu, S.M.Ku & C.I Peng
- Gentiana bavarica L. – Bavarian gentian
- Gentiana beamanii J.S.Pringle
- Gentiana bella Franch.
- Gentiana bicentenaria A.Estrada & A.Rojas
- Gentiana bicuspidata (G.Don) Briq.
- Gentiana × billingtonii Farw.
- Gentiana boissieri Schott & Kotschy ex Boiss.
- Gentiana bokorensis Hul
- Gentiana bolavenensis A.Nagah., Tagane & Soulad.
- Gentiana borneensis Hook.f.
- Gentiana boryi Boiss.
- Gentiana brachyphylla Vill.
- Gentiana bredboensis L.G.Adams - N.S.W
- Gentiana brentae Prosser & Bertolli
- Gentiana bryoides Burkill
- Gentiana burseri Lapeyr.
- Gentiana cachemirica Decne.
- Gentiana caelestis (C.Marquand) Harry Sm.
- Gentiana caeruleogrisea T.N.Ho
- Gentiana caliculata Lex.
- Gentiana calycosa Griseb. – Rainier pleated gentian
- Gentiana capitata Buch.-Ham. ex D.Don
- Gentiana carinata (D.Don ex G.Don) Griseb.
- Gentiana carinicostata Wernham
- Gentiana catesbaei Walter – Elliott's gentian
- Gentiana cephalantha Franch.
- Gentiana cephalodes Edgew.
- Gentiana × charpentieri E.Thomas ex Hegetschw.
- Gentiana chinensis Kusn.
- Gentiana choanantha C.Marquand
- Gentiana chungtienensis C.Marquand
- Gentiana clarkei Kusn.
- Gentiana clausa Raf. – bottled gentian
- Gentiana clusii Perr. & Songeon – trumpet gentian
- Gentiana confertifolia C.Marquand
- Gentiana coronata Royle
- Gentiana crassa Kurz
- Gentiana crassicaulis Duthie ex Burkill
- Gentiana crassula Harry Sm.
- Gentiana crassuloides Bureau & Franch.
- Gentiana cristata Harry Sm.
- Gentiana cruciata L. – cross gentian
- Gentiana cruttwellii Harry Sm.
- Gentiana cuneibarba Harry Sm.
- Gentiana × curtisii J.S.Pringle
- Gentiana dahurica Fisch.
- Gentiana davidi Franch.
- Gentiana decemfida Buch.-Ham. ex D.Don
- Gentiana decora Pollard – showy gentian
- Gentiana decumbens L.f.
- Gentiana delavayi Franch.
- Gentiana deltoidea Harry Sm.
- Gentiana dendrologi C.Marquand
- Gentiana densiflora T.N.Ho
- Gentiana depressa D.Don
- Gentiana × digenea Jakow.
- Gentiana divaricata T.N.Ho
- Gentiana diversifolia Merr.
- Gentiana douglasiana Bong. – swamp gentian
- Gentiana dschungarica Regel
- Gentiana dshimilensis K.Koch
- Gentiana duclouxii Franch.
- Gentiana durangensis Villarreal
- Gentiana ecaudata C.Marquand
- Gentiana elmeriana Halda
- Gentiana elwesii C.B.Clarke
- Gentiana emodi C.Marquand ex Sealy
- Gentiana ettingshausenii F.Muell.
- Gentiana exigua Harry Sm.
- Gentiana faucipilosa Harry Sm.
- Gentiana fieldiana J.S.Pringle
- Gentiana filistyla Balf.f. & Forrest
- Gentiana flavomaculata Hayata
- Gentiana flexicaulis Harry Sm.
- Gentiana formosa Harry Sm.
- Gentiana forrestii C.Marquand
- Gentiana franchetiana Kusn.
- Gentiana fremontii Torr. – moss gentian
- Gentiana frigida Haenke
- Gentiana froelichii Jan ex Rchb. – Karawanken gentian
- Gentiana futtereri Diels & Gilg
- Gentiana × gaudiniana E.Thomas ex W.D.J.Koch
- Gentiana gayi Griseb.
- Gentiana gelida M.Bieb.
- Gentiana georgei Diels
- Gentiana gilvostriata C.Marquand
- Gentiana glauca Pall. – pale gentian
- Gentiana grandiflora Laxm.
- Gentiana × grandilacustris J.S.Pringle
- Gentiana grata Harry Sm.
- Gentiana × grisebachiana Rouy
- Gentiana grumii Kusn.
- Gentiana gyirongensis T.N.Ho
- Gentiana handeliana Harry Sm.
- Gentiana haraldi-smithii Halda
- Gentiana harrowiana Diels
- Gentiana haynaldii Kanitz
- Gentiana heleonastes Harry Sm.
- Gentiana helophila Balf.f. & Forrest
- Gentiana hesseliana Hosseus
- Gentiana hexaphylla Maxim. ex Kusn.
- Gentiana himalayensis T.N.Ho
- Gentiana hirsuta Ma & E.W.Ma ex T.N.Ho
- Gentiana hohoxiliensis S.K.Wu & R.F.Huang
- Gentiana hooperi J.S.Pringle
- Gentiana hsinganica J.H.Yu
- Gentiana hugelii Griseb.
- Gentiana huxleyi Kusn.
- Gentiana × hybrida Schleich. ex DC.
- Gentiana intricata C.Marquand
- Gentiana jamesii Hemsl.
- Gentiana jarmilae Halda
- Gentiana jingdongensis T.N.Ho
- Gentiana jouyana Hul
- Gentiana kaohsiungensis Chih H.Chen & J.C.Wang
- Gentiana kauffmanniana Regel & Schmalh.
- Gentiana khammouanensis Hul
- Gentiana kirilowii Turcz.
- Gentiana kurroo Royle
- Gentiana kurumbae Anilkumar & Udayan
- Gentiana lacerulata Harry Sm.
- Gentiana laciniata Kit. ex Kanitz
- Gentiana × laengstii Hausm.
- Gentiana laevigata M.Martens & Galeotti
- Gentiana lagodechiana (Kusn.) Grossh.
- Gentiana langbianensis A.Chev. ex S.Hul
- Gentiana laotica Soulad., Tagane & Yahara
- Gentiana lateriflora Hemsl.
- Gentiana latidens (House) J.S.Pringle & Weakley
- Gentiana lawrencei Burkill
- Gentiana laxiflora T.N.Ho
- Gentiana leroyana Hul
- Gentiana leucomelaena Maxim.
- Gentiana lhassica Burkill
- Gentiana liangshanensis Z.Y.Zhu
- Gentiana licentii Harry Sm.
- Gentiana ligustica R.Vilm. & Chopinet
- Gentiana linearis Froel. – narrowleaf gentian
- Gentiana lineolata Franch.
- Gentiana linoides Franch.
- Gentiana loerzingii Ridl.
- Gentiana longicollis G.L.Nesom
- Gentiana loureiroi (G.Don) Griseb.
- Gentiana lowryi Hul
- Gentiana lutea L.
- Gentiana lycopodioides Stapf
- Gentiana macgregoryi Hemsl.
- Gentiana macrophylla Pall. – bigleaf gentian
- Gentiana maeulchanensis Franch.
- Gentiana mairei H.Lév.
- Gentiana makinoi Kusn.
- Gentiana manshurica Kitag.
- Gentiana × marcailhouana Rouy
- Gentiana × marceli-jouseaui Halda
- Gentiana × media Arv.-Touv.
- Gentiana meiantha (C.B.Clarke) Harry Sm.
- Gentiana melandriifolia Franch.
- Gentiana membranulifera T.N.Ho
- Gentiana micans C.B.Clarke
- Gentiana micantiformis Burkill
- Gentiana micrantha Aitch. ex Hemsl.
- Gentiana microdonta Franch.
- Gentiana microphyta Franch.
- Gentiana mirandae Paray
- Gentiana moniliformis C.Marquand
- Gentiana muscicola C.Marquand
- Gentiana myrioclada Franch.
- Gentiana namlaensis C.Marquand
- Gentiana nanobella C.Marquand
- Gentiana nerterifolia P.Royen
- Gentiana newberryi A.Gray – Newberry's gentian
- Gentiana nipponica Maxim.
- Gentiana nivalis L. – snow gentian
- Gentiana nubigena Edgew.
- Gentiana nudicaulis Kurz
- Gentiana nyalamensis T.N.Ho
- Gentiana obconica T.N.Ho
- Gentiana occidentalis Jakow. - Pyrenean trumpoet gentian
- Gentiana officinalis Harry Sm.
- Gentiana olgae Regel & Schmalh.
- Gentiana oligophylla Harry Sm.
- Gentiana olivieri Griseb.
- Gentiana oreocharis Halda & Jurášek
- Gentiana oreodoxa Harry Sm.
- Gentiana ornata (G.Don) Wall. ex Griseb.
- Gentiana ovatiloba Kusn.
- Gentiana pachyphylla Merr.
- Gentiana × pallidocyanea J.S.Pringle
- Gentiana pannonica Scop. – brown gentian
- Gentiana panthaica Prain & Burkill
- Gentiana papillosa Franch.
- Gentiana paradoxa Albov
- Gentiana parryae C.Marquand
- Gentiana parryi Engelm. – Parry's gentian
- Gentiana parvula Harry Sm.
- Gentiana pedata Harry Sm.
- Gentiana pedicellata (D.Don) Griseb.
- Gentiana perpusilla Brandegee
- Gentiana phyllocalyx C.B.Clarke
- Gentiana piasezkii Maxim.
- Gentiana picta Franch.
- Gentiana platypetala Griseb. – broadpetal gentian
- Gentiana plurisetosa C.T.Mason – bristly gentian
- Gentiana pneumonanthe L. – marsh gentian
- Gentiana praeclara C.Marquand
- Gentiana praticola Franch.
- Gentiana prattii Kusn.
- Gentiana pringlei M.Shabir, P.Agnihotri, J.K.Tiwari & T.Husain
- Gentiana producta T.N.Ho
- Gentiana prolata Balf.f.
- Gentiana prostrata Haenke – pygmy gentian
- Gentiana pseudosquarrosa Harry Sm.
- Gentiana puberulenta J.S.Pringle – downy gentian
- Gentiana pubigera C.Marquand
- Gentiana pulvinarum W.W.Sm.
- Gentiana pumila Jacq.
- Gentiana pumilio Standl. & Steyerm.
- Gentiana punctata L. – spotted gentian
- Gentiana purpurea L. – purple gentian
- Gentiana pyrenaica L.
- Gentiana qiujiangensis T.N.Ho
- Gentiana quadrifaria Blume
- Gentiana querceticola Halda & Jurášek
- Gentiana radiata C.Marquand
- Gentiana radicans Harry Sm.
- Gentiana ranae M.Shabir & M.D.Dwivedi
- Gentiana recurvata C.B.Clarke
- Gentiana riparia Kar. & Kir.
- Gentiana robusta King ex Hook.f.
- Gentiana rostanii Reut. ex Verlot
- Gentiana rubicunda Franch.
- Gentiana rubricaulis Schwein. – closed gentian
- Gentiana sagarmathae Miyam. & H.Ohba
- Gentiana saginifolia Wernham
- Gentiana saginoides Burkill
- Gentiana saltuum C.Marquand
- Gentiana saponaria L. – harvestbells gentian
- Gentiana sasidharanii K.M.P.Kumar & Sunil
- Gentiana satsunanensis T.Yamaz.
- Gentiana scabra Bunge
- Gentiana scabrida Hayata
- Gentiana sceptrum Griseb. – king's scepter gentian
- Gentiana scytophylla T.N.Ho
- Gentiana sedifolia Kunth
- Gentiana septemfida Pall. – crested gentian
- Gentiana setigera A.Gray – Mendocino gentian
- Gentiana shaanxiensis T.N.Ho
- Gentiana sierrae Briq.
- Gentiana sikkimensis C.B.Clarke
- Gentiana sikokiana Maxim.
- Gentiana simulatrix C.Marquand
- Gentiana sino-ornata Balf.f. – showy Chinese gentian
- Gentiana siphonantha Maxim. ex Kusn.
- Gentiana sirensis J.S.Pringle
- Gentiana spathacea Kunth
- Gentiana spathulifolia Kusn.
- Gentiana spathulisepala T.N.Ho & S.W.Liu
- Gentiana springateana D.Maity
- Gentiana squarrosa Ledeb.
- Gentiana stellata Turrill
- Gentiana stellulata Harry Sm.
- Gentiana stipitata Edgew.
- Gentiana stragulata Balf.f. & Forrest
- Gentiana straminea Maxim.
- Gentiana suborbisepala C.Marquand
- Gentiana subpolytrichoides Grubov
- Gentiana subuliformis S.W.Liu
- Gentiana sumatrana Ridl.
- Gentiana susamyrensis Pachom.
- Gentiana susanneae Adr.Favre
- Gentiana sutchuenensis Franch.
- Gentiana szechenyii Kanitz
- Gentiana taiwanialbiflora S.S.Ying
- Gentiana taiwanica T.N.Ho
- Gentiana takushii T.Yamaz.
- Gentiana taliensis Balf.f. & Forrest
- Gentiana tarokoensis Chih H.Chen & J.C.Wang
- Gentiana tatsienensis Franch.
- Gentiana terglouensis Hacq. – Triglav gentian
- Gentiana ternifolia Franch.
- Gentiana tetraphylla Maxim. ex Kusn.
- Gentiana tetrasepala Biswas
- Gentiana tetrasticha C.Marquand
- Gentiana thunbergii (G.Don) Griseb.
- Gentiana tibetica King ex Hook.f.
- Gentiana timida Kerr
- Gentiana tongolensis Franch.
- Gentiana tonkinensis Hul
- Gentiana tornezyana Litard. & Maire
- Gentiana trichotoma Kusn.
- Gentiana tricolor Diels & Gilg
- Gentiana triflora Pall.
- Gentiana tubiflora (G.Don) Griseb.
- Gentiana ulmeri Merr.
- Gentiana uniflora Georgi
- Gentiana urnula Harry Sm.
- Gentiana utriculosa L. – bladder gentian
- Gentiana vandellioides Hemsl.
- Gentiana vandewateri Wernham
- Gentiana veitchiorum Hemsl.
- Gentiana venusta (G.Don) Wall. ex Griseb.
- Gentiana verna L. – spring gentian
- Gentiana vernayi C.Marquand
- Gentiana viatrix Harry Sm. ex C.Marquand
- Gentiana villosa L. – striped gentian
- Gentiana vodopjanovae (Zuev) Chepinoga
- Gentiana waltonii Burkill
- Gentiana walujewii Regel & Schmalh.
- Gentiana wangchukii E.Aitken & D.G.Long
- Gentiana wardii W.W.Sm.
- Gentiana wasenensis C.Marquand
- Gentiana wilsonii C.Marquand
- Gentiana winchuanensis T.N.Ho
- Gentiana wingecarribiensis L.G.Adams - N.S.W.
- Gentiana woodii J.S.Pringle
- Gentiana xanthonannos Harry Sm.
- Gentiana yakushimensis Makino
- Gentiana yokusai Burkill
- Gentiana yunnanensis Franch.
- Gentiana zekuensis T.N.Ho & S.W.Liu
- Gentiana zhenxiongensis L.H.Wu & Z.T.Wang
- Gentiana zollingeri Fawc.

=== Formerly placed here ===
The genus Gentianella was often included within Gentiana in the past.

In older classifications, several groups now said as separate genera were included within Gentiana. In addition to Gentianella, these included Gentianopsis. Morphological and molecular phylogenetic studies have supported their separations from Gentiana: Gentiana belongs to the subtribe Gentianinae, whereas Gentianella and Gentianopsis are placed in the subtribe Swertiinae. Species previously classified in Gentiana were therefore reassigned when these genera were recognized as different.

== Cultivation ==
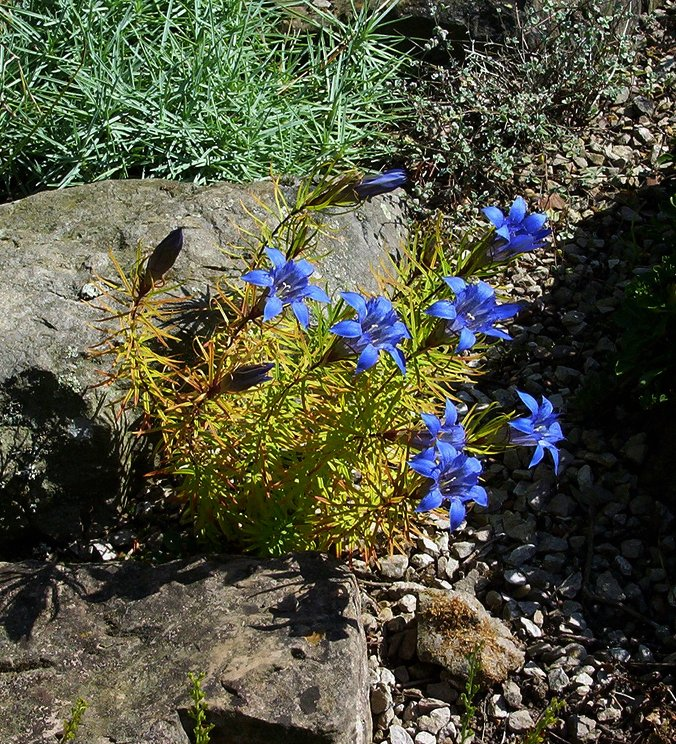
Gentiana paradoxa

Several gentian species may be found in cultivation, and are valued for the unusual intensity of their blue flowers. They have a reputation for being difficult to grow. All require similar conditions – moist, rich, free-draining soil with an acid to neutral pH. They include:

- G. acaulis
- G. asclepiadea
- G. paradoxa
- G. septemfida
- G. sino-ornata

In addition, the following cultivars, of mixed or uncertain parentage, have gained the Royal Horticultural Society's Award of Garden Merit:

- 'Blue Silk'
- 'Shot Silk'
- 'Strathmore'
