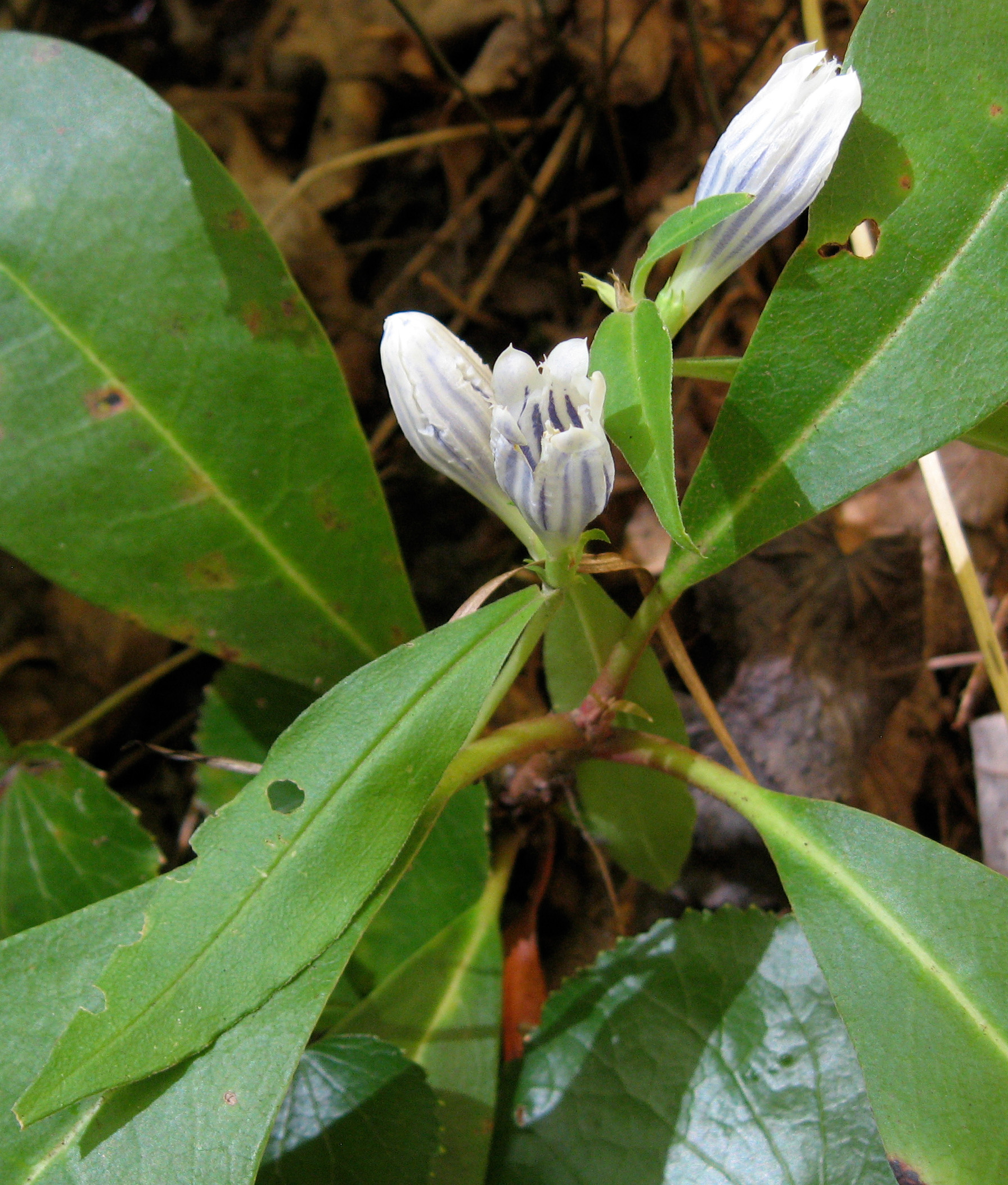

Scientific classification
- Kingdom: Plantae
- Clade: Tracheophytes
- Clade: Angiosperms
- Clade: Eudicots
- Clade: Asterids
- Order: Gentianales
- Family: Gentianaceae
- Genus: Gentiana
- Species: G. decora

Binomial name
- Gentiana decora Pollard

= Gentiana decora =

Species of plant

Gentiana decora, commonly called Appalachian gentian or showy gentian is a flowering plant in the gentian family. It is native to North America, where it is endemic to the Southern Appalachian Mountains. Its natural habitat is acidic oak woodlands, most often in somewhat dry conditions.

Its flowers are blue-white and produced late in the fall.
