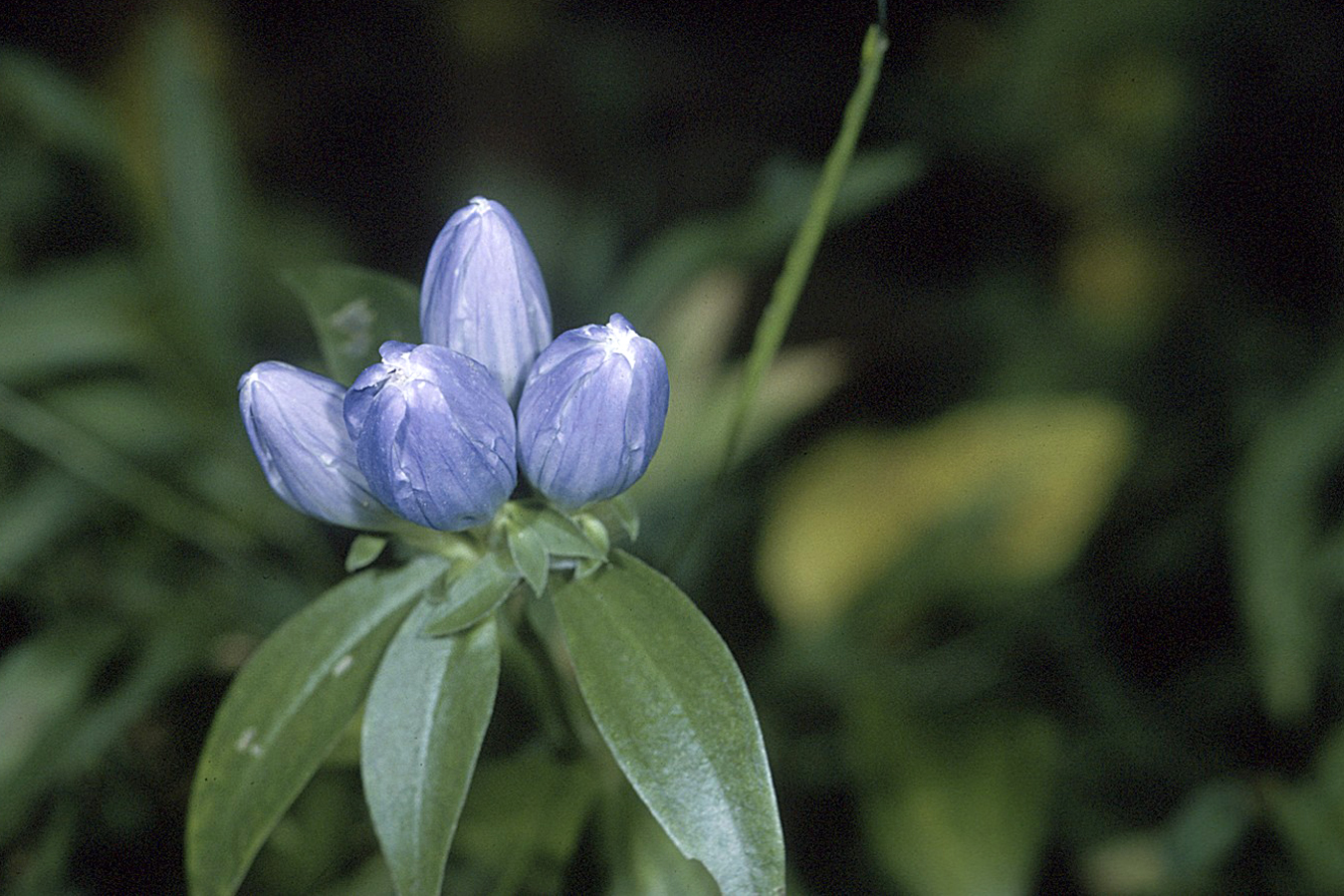

Scientific classification
- Kingdom: Plantae
- Clade: Tracheophytes
- Clade: Angiosperms
- Clade: Eudicots
- Clade: Asterids
- Order: Gentianales
- Family: Gentianaceae
- Genus: Gentiana
- Species: G. clausa

Binomial name
- Gentiana clausa Raf.

= Gentiana clausa =

Species of plant

Gentiana clausa, one of several plants with the common name "bottle gentian", is a 1'–2' tall flowering plant in the Gentianaceae family. It is native to Eastern North American moist meadows and woods at higher elevations, from Quebec in the north, through the Appalachian range to North Carolina and Tennessee in the south. It has paired, lanceolate leaves, usually on unbranched stalks, and blue blooms which remain closed or nearly so (thus the Latin specific name). Bumblebees are strong enough to push open the petals to suck nectar, thus pollinating the flower, just like for Gentiana andrewsii. Gentiana clausa flowers from late August to October.

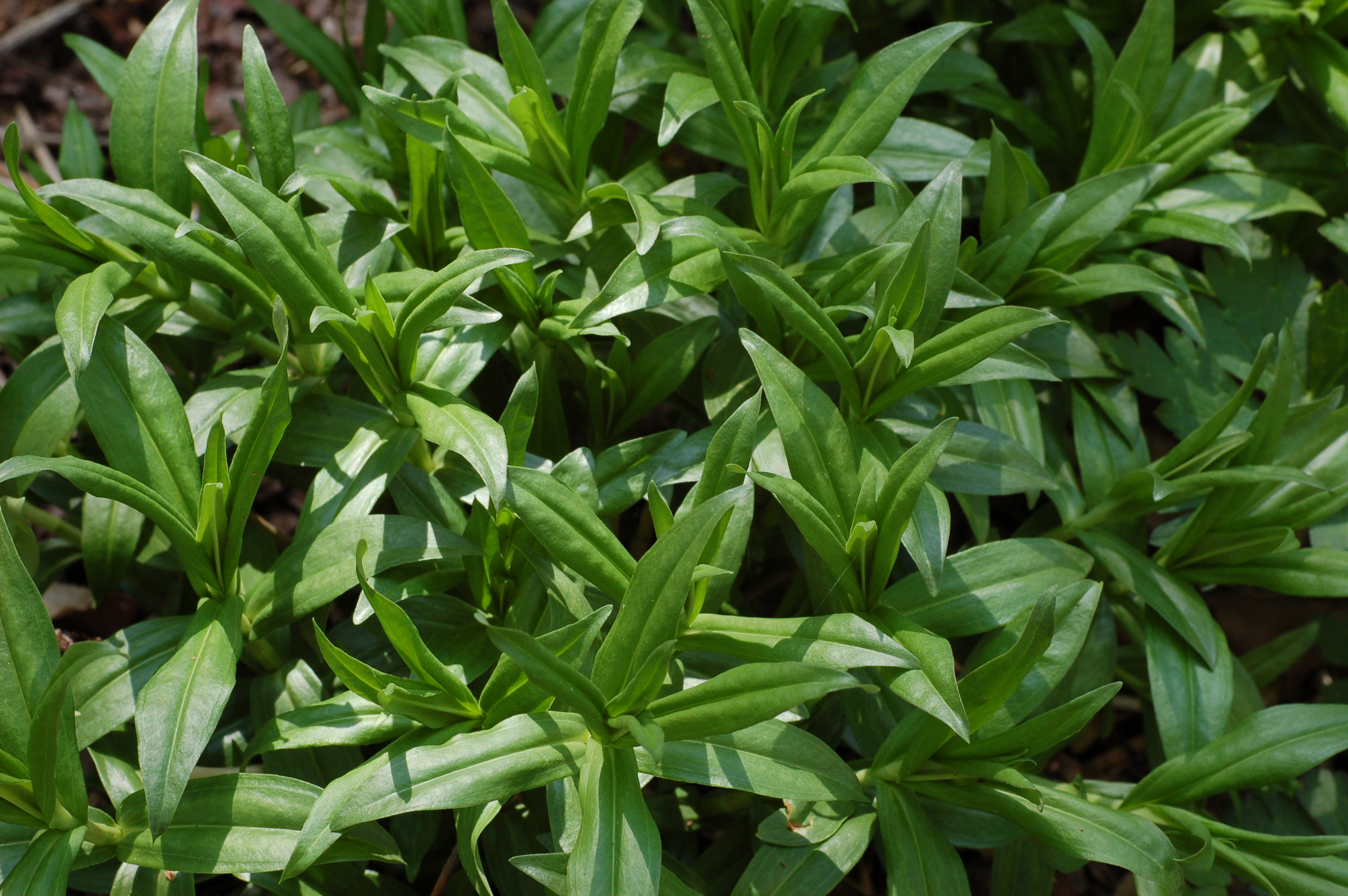
Gentiana clausa foliage
