= List of Gentianales of Montana =

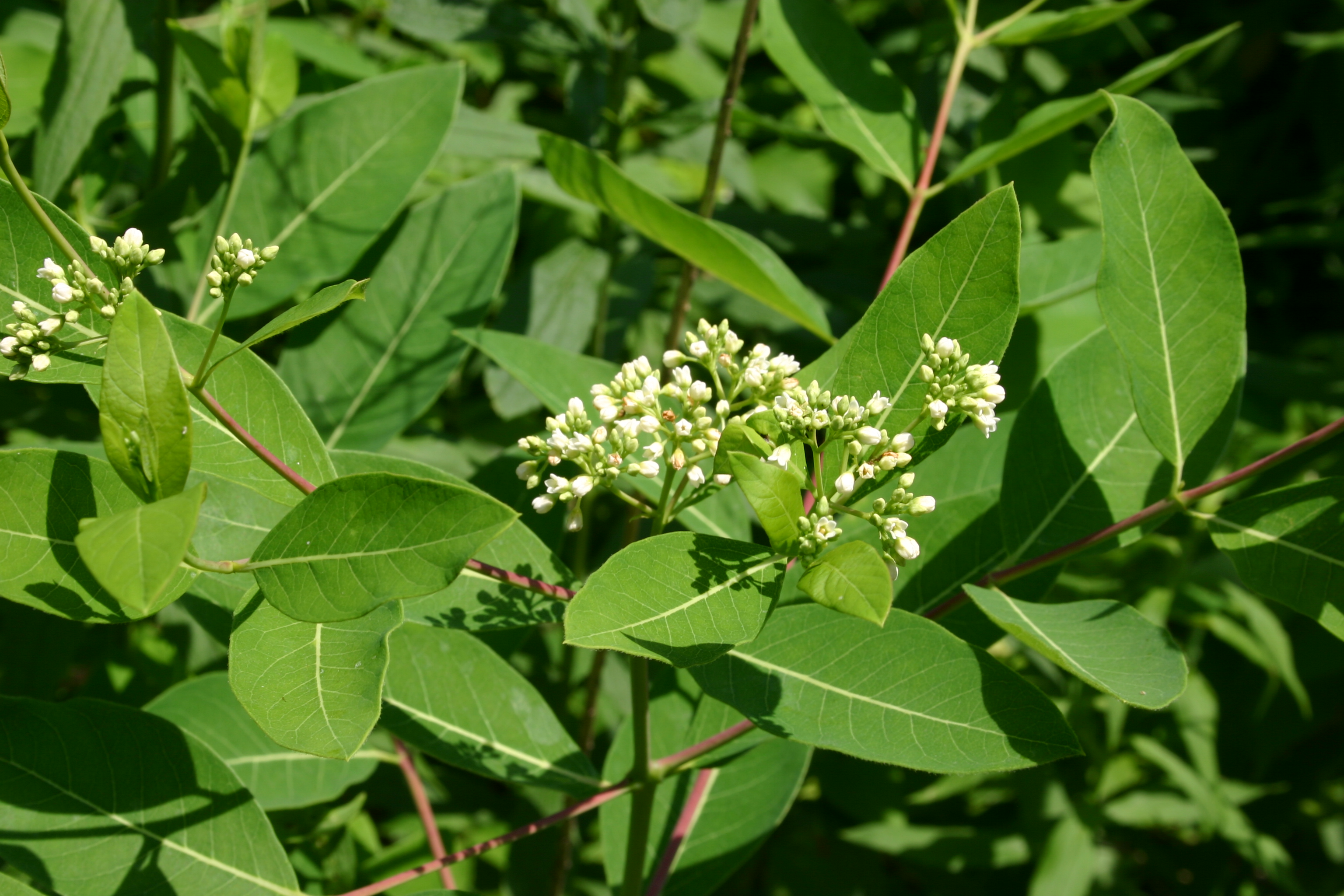
Clasping-leaf dogbane, Apocynum cannabinum

There are at least 28 members of the dogbane, gentian and milkweed order, Gentianales, found in Montana. Some of these species are exotics (not native to Montana) and some species have been designated as Species of Concern.

== Dogbanes ==
Family: Apocynaceae

- Apocynum androsaemifolium, spreading dogbane
- Apocynum cannabinum, clasping-leaf dogbane

== Gentians ==
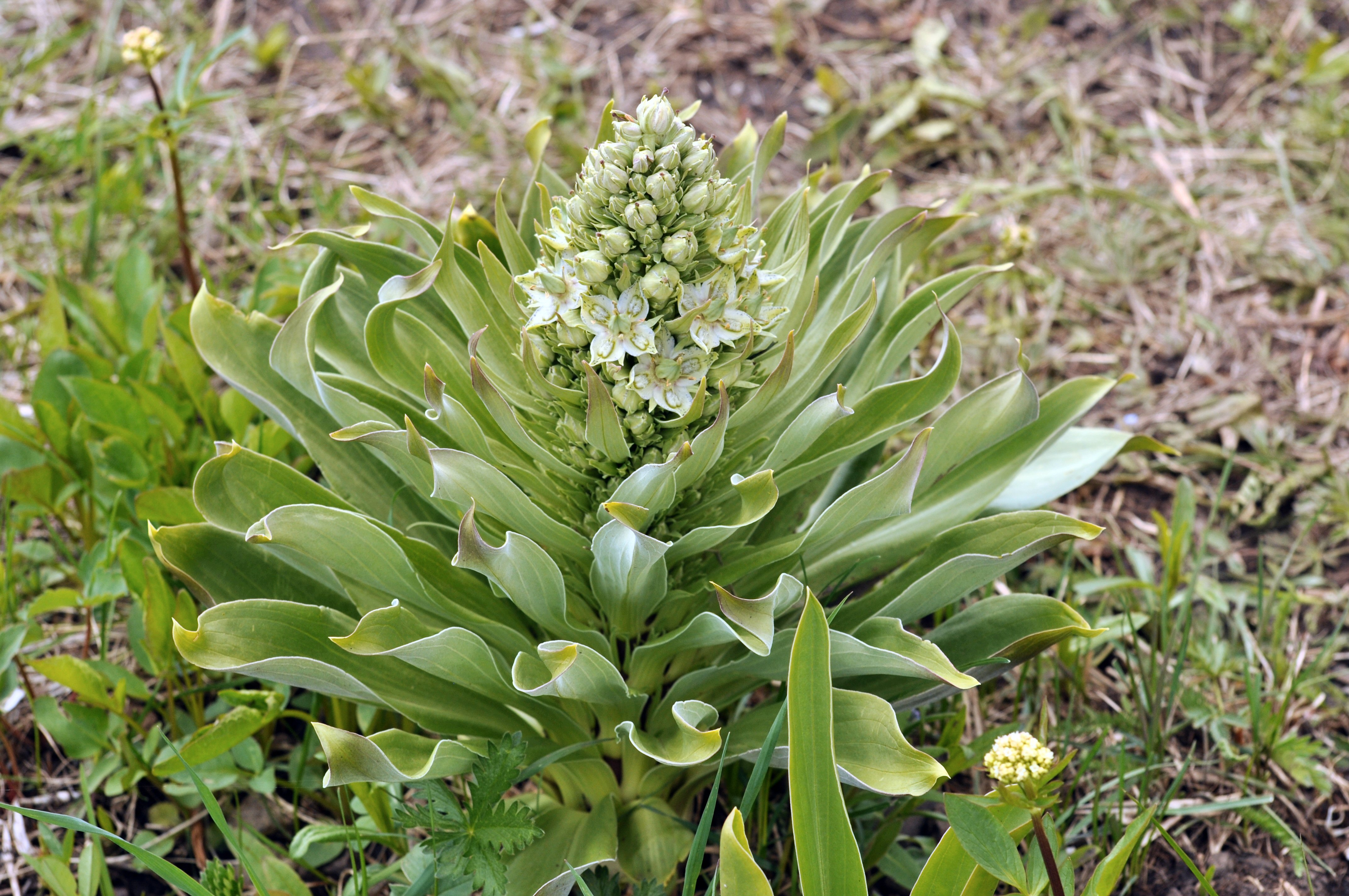
Green gentian, Frasera speciosa

Family: Gentianaceae

- Eustoma grandiflorum, showy prairie-gentian
- Frasera albicaulis, white-stem frasera
- Frasera speciosa, green gentian
- Gentiana affinis, prairie gentian
- Gentiana algida, whitish gentian
- Gentiana calycosa, explorer's gentian
- Gentiana fremontii, moss gentian
- Gentiana glauca, glaucous gentian
- Gentiana prostrata, pygmy gentian
- Gentianella amarella, northern gentian
- Gentianella propinqua, four-parted gentian
- Gentianella tenella, slender gentian
- Gentianopsis macounii, Macoun's gentian
- Gentianopsis simplex, hiker's gentian
- Gentianopsis thermalis, Rocky Mountain fringed gentian
- Halenia deflexa, spurred gentian
- Lomatogonium rotatum, marsh felwort
- Swertia perennis, felwort
- Zeltnera exaltata, western centaury

== Milkweeds ==
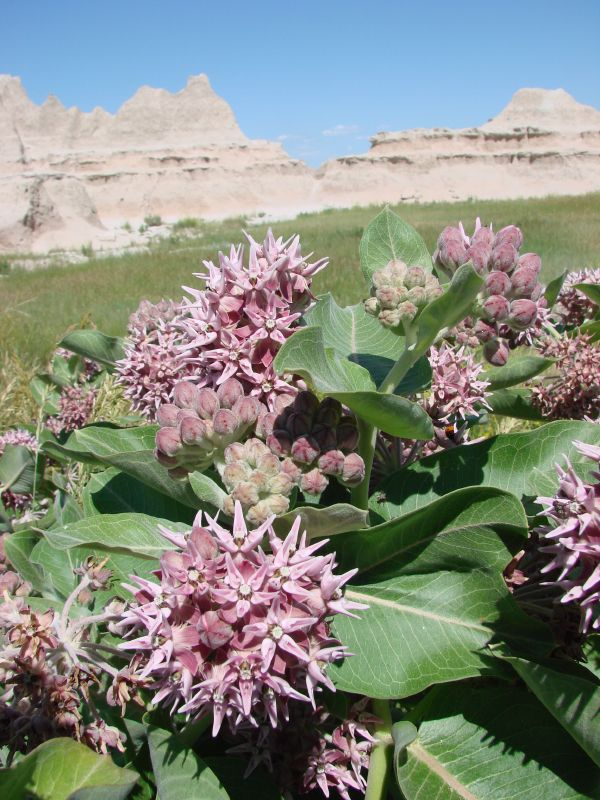
Showy milkweed, Asclepias speciosa

Family: Asclepiadaceae

- Asclepias incarnata, swamp milkweed
- Asclepias ovalifolia, ovalleaf milkweed
- Asclepias pumila, low milkweed
- Asclepias speciosa, showy milkweed
- Asclepias stenophylla, narrowleaf milkweed
- Asclepias verticillata, whorled milkweed
- Asclepias viridiflora, green milkweed

== See also ==
- List of dicotyledons of Montana
