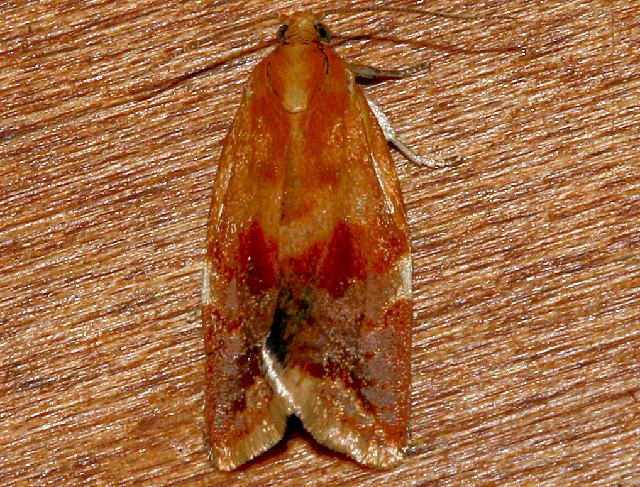

Scientific classification
- Kingdom: Animalia
- Phylum: Arthropoda
- Clade: Pancrustacea
- Class: Insecta
- Order: Lepidoptera
- Family: Tortricidae
- Genus: Clepsis
- Species: C. persicana

Binomial name
- Clepsis persicana (Fitch, 1856)

Synonyms
- Croesia persicana Fitch, 1856; Ditula blandana Clemens, 1864; Tortrix conigerana Zeller, 1875; Clepsis forbesi Obraztsov, 1962; Lozotaenia fragariana Packard, 1869

= Clepsis persicana =

Species of moth

Clepsis persicana, the white triangle tortrix or the green needleworm, is a species of moth of the family Tortricidae. It is found in North America, where it has been recorded from Alaska and British Columbia to Newfoundland and south to Virginia and west to California. The habitat consists of coniferous and mixed coniferous forests.

The larva is slender and very active, with yellow head and wide, indistinct greyish stripes on the body. In Ontario, larvae have been collected in late May and June. Measures to control green needleworms have not been needed. The length of the forewings is 8.5-10.5 mm for males and 10–11 mm for females. The forewings are orange basally, becoming darker and purplish towards the termen, which is pale. Adults are on wing from June to August in one generation per year.

The larvae have been recorded feeding on a wide range of deciduous and coniferous trees, including Acer (including Acer negundo), Osmorhiza, Solidago, Alnus (including Alnus viridis, Alnus incana), Betula (Betula papyrifera, Betula nana), Corylus, Cornus canadensis, Rhododendron canadense, Vaccinium, Frasera (including Frasera fastigiata), Ribes, Maianthemum canadense, Comptonia peregrina, Fraxinus, Abies (including Abies balsamea, Abies concolor, Abies lasiocarpa), Larix (Larix occidentalis), Picea (including Picea glauca, Picea engelmannii), Pinus (including Pinus banksiana), Pseudotsuga (including Pseudotsuga menziesii), Ceanothus, Malus pumila, Prunus (including Prunus virginiana, Prunus persica), Rosa, Rubus, Populus (including Populus tremuloides, Populus balsamifera), Salix and Ulmus. They web the leaves of their host plant and feed in the calyx. Young larvae lower themselves on a silk thread and search for abandoned shelters of other Tortricidae species. If no such shelter is found, the larvae will feed on cover plants on the ground. The species overwinters as a mid-instar larva. Pupation takes place under the bark of their host plant or in amongst fallen leaves at the base of a tree. The larvae have a yellowish-green or greyish-green body and a yellowish-brown head. They can be found from April to June.
