= Macrocarpaea dies-viridis =

Scientific classification
- Kingdom: Plantae
- Clade: Embryophytes
- Clade: Tracheophytes
- Clade: Spermatophytes
- Clade: Angiosperms
- Clade: Eudicots
- Clade: Asterids
- Order: Gentianales
- Family: Gentianaceae
- Genus: Macrocarpaea
- Species: M. dies-viridis

Binomial name
- Macrocarpaea dies-viridis J.R.Grant

Species of flowering plant

Macrocarpaea dies-viridis, commonly known as the Green Day moon gentian, is a species of flowering plant in the family Gentianaceae. It is a small tree with thin leaves, a funnel-shaped corolla, and capsule fruits. Each capsule has over 10,000 seeds.

Macrocarpaea dies-viridis is native to Ecuador. It was described in 2007 and named after the band Green Day.

== Taxonomy ==
Macrocarpaea dies-viridis was described in 2007, by Jason Randall Grant. The type material was collected from the Cordillera del Cóndor in 2006. It was described alongside Macrocarpaea luctans, Macrocarpaea lucubrans, and Macrocarpaea opulenta.

Within genus Macrocarpaea, the species is part of the section Choriophylla. It is closely related to M. jensii, M. lenae, M. pringleana, and M. sodiroana.

== Distribution ==
Macrocarpaea dies-viridis is native to the wet tropical biome of Ecuador's Zamora-Chinchipe Province.

== Description ==
Macrocarpaea dies-viridis is a shrub or small tree, that grows 1–4 metres (3.3–13.1 ft) high. The trunk is up to 3 centimetres (1.2 in) wide and hollow at the top. The bark is tan to greenish in colour, thin and papery in texture, and often covered with lichen and moss.

The leaves are papery and thin, ovate to ovate-elliptical, 33–41 millimetres (1.3–1.6 in) long, and 18–32 millimetres (0.71–1.26 in) wide. They are dark green and have smooth edges. The leaf stems are 44–51 centimetres (1.44–1.67 ft) long.

The inflorescence is an open thyrse with many branches. The inflorescence is over 40 centimetres (1.3 ft) long, and the branches are 5–30 centimetres (0.16–0.98 ft) long. Each branch has nine to twenty flowers, which grow on 14–25 millimetres (0.55–0.98 in) stems. The calyx is green, bell-shaped, 6–8 millimetres (0.24–0.31 in) long, and 6–7 millimetres (0.24–0.28 in) wide. The calyx lobes are ovate to rotund. The corolla is funnel-shaped and has not been described in detail, as the only collected flower was lost.

The fruits are ellipsoidal to linear, greenish-brown capsules. The capsules are 32–45 millimetres (1.3–1.8 in) long, and 6–8 millimetres (0.24–0.31 in) wide. They are smooth or have faint ribs. The seeds are 0.9–1.3 millimetres (0.035–0.051 in) long, 0.9–1 millimetre (0.035–0.039 in) wide. The seed coat is tannish.

Each capsule is estimated to contain 10,400 to 11,000 seeds, depending on the estimation method used. This results in each plant having about 520,000 to 550,000 seeds per year. Macrocarpaea dies-viridis was the first species of Macrocarpeae to have its seeds counted.

== Etymology ==
The specific epithet "dies-viridis" refers to the American punk-rock band Green Day, which the authors listened to during their 2006 expedition to Ecuador. The hyphen is to be maintained.
