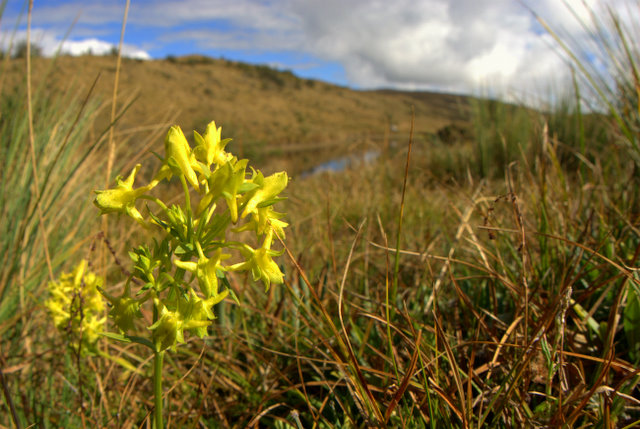

Scientific classification
- Kingdom: Plantae
- Clade: Tracheophytes
- Clade: Angiosperms
- Clade: Eudicots
- Clade: Asterids
- Order: Gentianales
- Family: Gentianaceae
- Tribe: Gentianeae
- Subtribe: Swertiinae
- Genus: Halenia; Borkh.

= Halenia =

Genus of plants

Halenia (spurred gentian) is a genus of plant in family Gentianaceae. It contains the following species (but this list may be incomplete):

- Halenia alleniana, Standl. ex Wilbur
- Halenia aquilegiella, Standl.
- Halenia brevicornis, (Kunth) G. Don
- Halenia corniculata, (L.) Cornaz
- Halenia crumiana, Wilbur
- Halenia decumbens, C.K. Allen
- Halenia deflexa, (Sm.) Griseb.
- Halenia elliptica, D. Don
- Halenia kalbreyeri, Gilg
- Halenia longicaulis, J.S. Pringle
- Halenia minima, C.K. Allen
- Halenia palmeri, A. Gray
- Halenia plantaginea, C.K. Allen
- Halenia pringlei, B.L. Rob. & Seaton
- Halenia pulchella, Gilg
- Halenia recurva, C.K. Allen
- Halenia rhyacophila, C.K. Allen
- Halenia rusbyi, Gilg
- Halenia schiedeana, Griseb.
- Halenia serpyllifolia, J.S. Pringle
- Halenia taruga-gasso, Gilg
- Halenia viridis, Gilg
- Halenia weddelliana, Gilg
