= Halenia serpyllifolia =

Conservation status
- Endangered (IUCN 3.1)

Scientific classification
- Kingdom: Plantae
- Clade: Tracheophytes
- Clade: Angiosperms
- Clade: Eudicots
- Clade: Asterids
- Order: Gentianales
- Family: Gentianaceae
- Genus: Halenia
- Species: H. serpyllifolia

Binomial name
- Halenia serpyllifolia J.S.Pringle

Species of plant

Halenia serpyllifolia is a species of flowering plant in the Gentianaceae family. It is endemic to Ecuador. Its natural habitat is subtropical or tropical high-elevation grassland.
