= Gasso =

Gasso and Gassó are surnames. Notable people with the name include:

- Blanca de Gassó y Ortiz (1846–1877), Spanish writer and poet
- DJ Gasso (born 1995), American softball coach
- Dominic Gasso (born 2003), American soccer player
- Leopolda Gassó y Vidal (1851–1885), Spanish writer and painter
- Patty Gasso (born 1962), American softball coach

== See also ==
- Halenia taruga-gasso, species of plant in the Gentianaceae family
