= Frasera gypsicola =

Conservation status
- Critically Imperiled (NatureServe)

Scientific classification
- Kingdom: Plantae
- Clade: Tracheophytes
- Clade: Angiosperms
- Clade: Eudicots
- Clade: Asterids
- Order: Gentianales
- Family: Gentianaceae
- Genus: Frasera
- Species: F. gypsicola

Binomial name
- Frasera gypsicola (Barneby) D.M.Post

Synonyms
- Swertia gypsicola

Species of plant

Frasera gypsicola is a species of flowering plant in the gentian family known by the common names Sunnyside green-gentian, Sunnyside elkweed, and Sunnyside frasera. It is native to southeastern Nevada and southwestern Utah in the United States.

This plant was first collected in Nye County, Nevada, near Sunnyside. It was described to science in 1942. Like other Frasera, it was previously included in genus Swertia, and some authors will retain it in that genus. In 1983 it was discovered in Utah for the first time; there are two extant occurrences in Utah as of 2017.

This plant grows in the Great Basin of the United States. It is found in the White River Valley in Nevada and in Millard County, Utah. The habitat is calcareous rock barrens and saline washes. When the plant received its name it was thought that the substrate contained high amounts of gypsum, but analysis shows that there are only small amounts, if any. Associated plants include Artemisia pygmaea, Artemisia tridentata, Chrysothamnus sp. and Sarcobatus vermiculatus, Elymus cinereus, Elymus elymoides, Sporobolus airoides, Stipa hymenoides, Comandra umbellata, Eriogonum shockleyi, Hymenopappus filifolius, Lepidium nanum, Phlox tumulosa, and Physaria sp.

== Description ==
This perennial herb has a mound of basal grasslike leaves and stems up to 20 centimeters tall. The flowers are white with a green base and purple mottling. Flowering occurs in June and July. It is easily told from Frasera albomarginata, which may grow with it.

== Conservation ==
Frasera gypsicola is listed as a critically endangered and fully protected species by the State of Nevada.

Threats to this plant include habitat destruction and degradation caused by cattle and vehicles.
