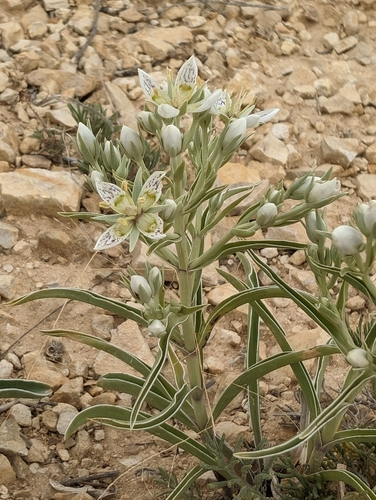

Conservation status
- Imperiled (NatureServe)

Scientific classification
- Kingdom: Plantae
- Clade: Embryophytes
- Clade: Tracheophytes
- Clade: Spermatophytes
- Clade: Angiosperms
- Clade: Eudicots
- Clade: Asterids
- Order: Gentianales
- Family: Gentianaceae
- Genus: Frasera
- Species: F. coloradensis

Binomial name
- Frasera coloradensis (C.M.Rogers) D.M.Post,

Synonyms
- Swertia coloradensis C.M.Rogers (1949)

= Frasera coloradensis =

Plant species in the gentian family

Frasera coloradensis is a species of flowering plant in the gentian family known by the common name Colorado green gentian. It is endemic to Colorado in the United States, where it is limited to the southeastern corner of the state.

== Description ==
Frasera coloradensis is a small plant, usually growing to between 10 and 25 centimeters tall when flowering. Before flowering plants grow for many years as a low clump of basal leaves, ones that sprout directly from the base of the plant at ground level. The leaves are thick, with linear-oblanceolate shape, like a reversed spearhead with the thicker portion past the midpoint, but very narrow like a blade of grass. The edges of the leaves are white and their length is about 8–10 centimeters while just 1 cm wide, but may occasionally be as short as 4 cm. They may be smooth or have very small hairs. The plant grows from a thick and woody taproot.

When a plant is ready to bloom it grows many branched stems with leaves attached to opposite sides. These cauline leaves are shorter, 4–8 centimeters long and just 6–9 millimeters wide. Other species in the Frasera genus tend to have stems that stand up straight while those of Frasera coloradensis lean away from each other. The inflorescences are branched panicles with many greenish-white flowers with purple dots, each with four petals 8-10 mm long.

It is generally monocarpic, living for a few years, producing flowers just once, then dying. In their native habitat they bloom from mid-June to mid-July. The seeds develop in July.

== Taxonomy ==
Frasera coloradensis was scientifically described by Claude Marvin Rogers in 1949 with the name Swertia coloradensis. He found the plants in 1947 while doing work on his doctoral thesis. The type specimen was found on a rocky slope in Las Animas County, Colorado near the border of Baca County. It was given its present name by Douglas Manners Post in 1958.

=== Names ===
In English Frasera coloradensis is commonly called Colorado green gentian or the shortened Colorado gentian. It is also occasionally called Colorado frasera.

== Range and habitat ==
This plant occurs in Baca, Bent, Las Animas, and Prowers Counties in southeastern Colorado. Its well established range is a strip 97 kilometers (60 mi) long and 40 kilometers (25 mi) wide. It is mostly limited to the Greenhorn Limestone, a geological formation appearing as limestone outcrops. It may also occur on Graneros shale and Dakota sandstone. The habitat is shortgrass prairie. It may occur with Juniperus monosperma and Haplopappus engelmannii. It grows at elevations of 1200 to 1700 meters.

Threats to this species include overgrazing, herbicides, and habitat loss and degradation.
