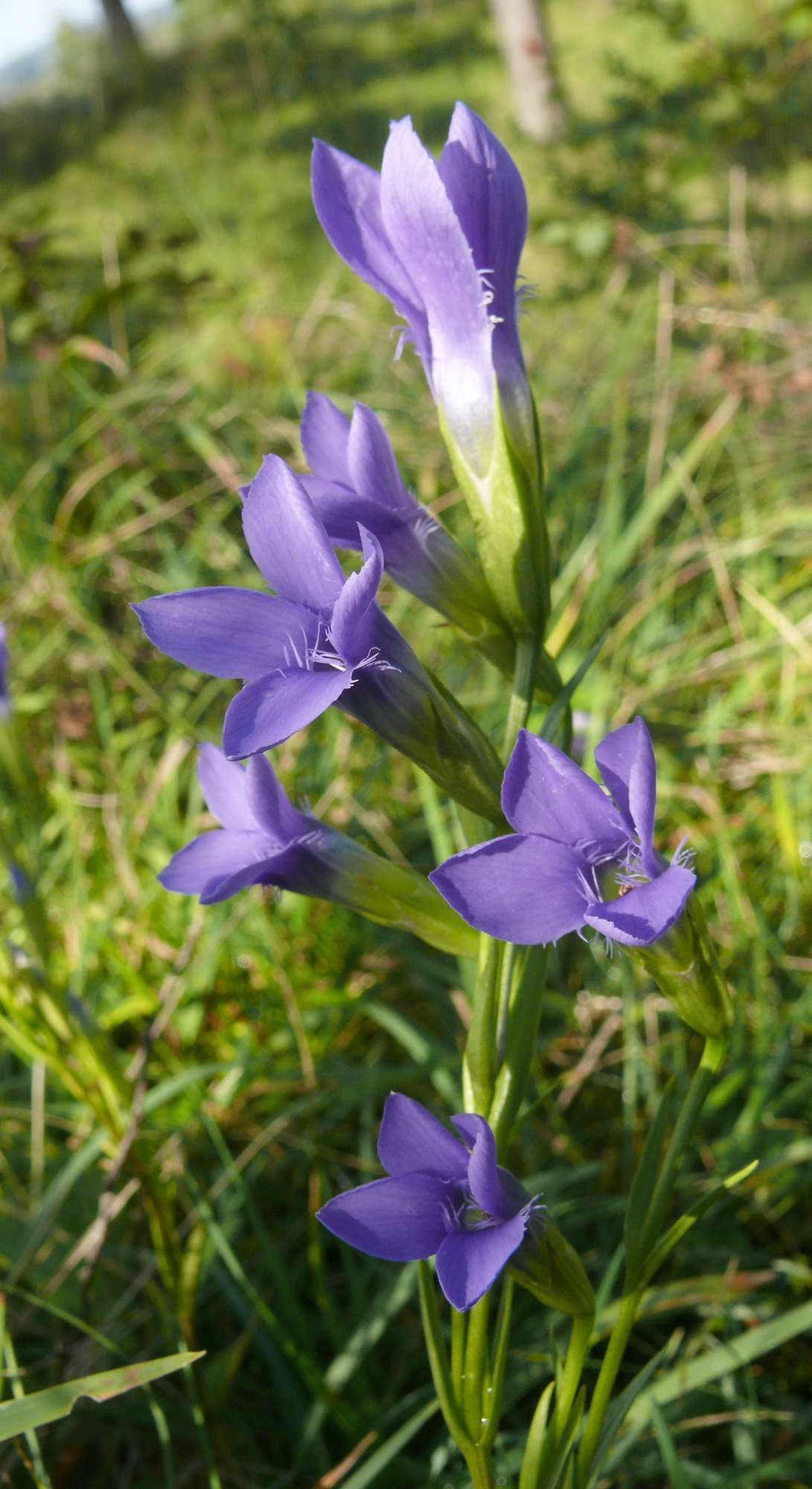
- Gentianopsis ciliata

Scientific classification
- Kingdom: Plantae
- Clade: Tracheophytes
- Clade: Angiosperms
- Clade: Eudicots
- Clade: Asterids
- Order: Gentianales
- Family: Gentianaceae
- Tribe: Gentianeae
- Subtribe: Swertiinae
- Genus: Gentianopsis; Ma

Species
- About 15; see text

Synonyms
- Anthopogon Neck. ex Raf.; Crossopetalum Roth; Denckea Raf.; Lehmanna Casseb. & Theob.

= Gentianopsis =

Genus of plants

Gentianopsis is a genus of flowering plants in the gentian family known commonly as fringed gentians. These are similar to the gentians of genus Gentiana. Most have flowers which are blue to purple in color. They may be annual or perennial. They are native to Eurasia and temperate North America.

== Species ==
The following species are recognised in the genus Gentianopsis:

- Gentianopsis barbata (Froel.) Ma
- Gentianopsis barbellata (Engelm.) Iltis - perennial fringed gentian
- Gentianopsis ciliata (L.) Ma - fringe-flowered gentian
- Gentianopsis contorta (Royle) Ma
- Gentianopsis crinita (Froel.) Ma - greater fringed gentian
- Gentianopsis detonsa (Rottb.) Ma - windmill fringed gentian
- Gentianopsis doluchanovii (Grossh.) Tzvelev
- Gentianopsis grandis Ma
- Gentianopsis holopetala (A.Gray) Iltis - Sierra fringed gentian
- Gentianopsis komarovii (Grossh.) Toyok.
- Gentianopsis lanceolata (Benth.) Iltis
- Gentianopsis lutea (Burkill) Ma
- Gentianopsis macounii (Holm) Iltis - Macoun's fringed gentian
- Gentianopsis macrantha (D.Don ex G.Don) Iltis - grand fringed gentian
- Gentianopsis nesophila (Holm) Iltis
- Gentianopsis paludosa (Hook.f.) Ma
- Gentianopsis simplex (A.Gray) Iltis - oneflower fringed gentian
- Gentianopsis thermalis (Kuntze) Iltis - Rocky Mountain fringed gentian
- Gentianopsis victorinii (Fernald) Iltis
- Gentianopsis virgata (Raf.) Holub - lesser fringed gentian
- Gentianopsis yabei (Takeda & H.Hara) Ma
