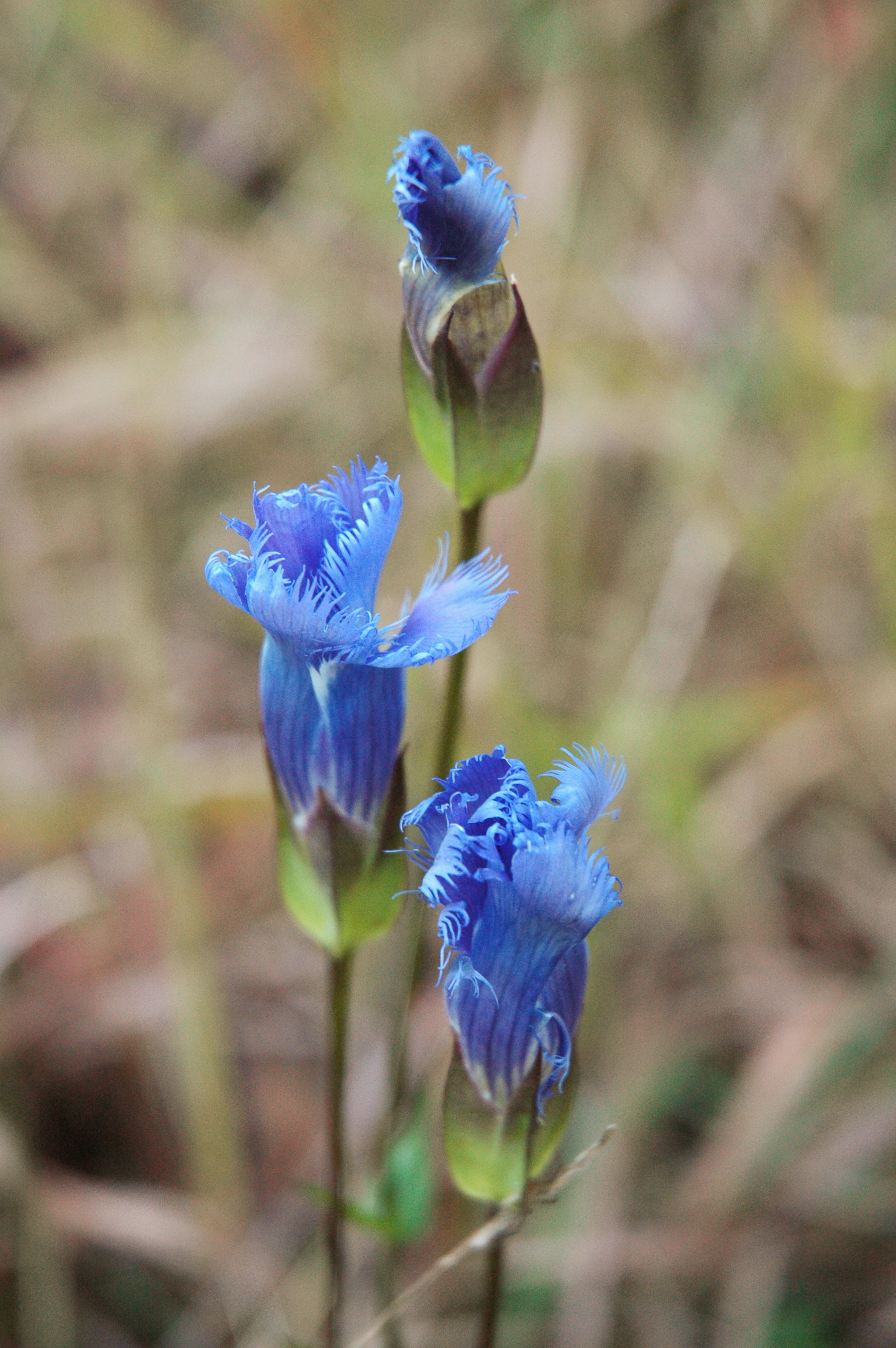

Scientific classification
- Kingdom: Plantae
- Clade: Tracheophytes
- Clade: Angiosperms
- Clade: Eudicots
- Clade: Asterids
- Order: Gentianales
- Family: Gentianaceae
- Genus: Gentianopsis
- Species: G. crinita

Binomial name
- Gentianopsis crinita (Froel.) Ma

= Gentianopsis crinita =

Species of plant

Gentianopsis crinita (sometimes called greater fringed gentian or blue gentian) is a biennial herbaceous species, native to eastern USA and eastern Canada. The flowers of fringed gentian open on sunny days, but generally remain closed on cloudy days. Individual plants live for only one or two years; the plant is noted as having become relatively rare. It grows in moist, limey woods, meadows, and stream banks.

In autumn, solitary, iridescent blue flowers develop on naked peduncles approximately 2 to 10 cm (3/4 to 4 in) in height. Each finely fringed petal is 3.5 to 6 cm (1 3/8 to 2 3/8 in) in length. The outermost flower parts are two pairs of green sepals, strongly winged and flared on the basal margins, the outer pair much larger than the inner.

It is closely related to Gentianopsis virgata (Raf.) Holub, which is sometimes lumped within a broadly transcribed G. crinita.

According to ancient Roman naturalist Pliny, King Gentius of Illyria found that the roots were useful as an emetic, cathartic, and tonic. From him, the plant's name is derived.
