= Frasera neglecta =

Scientific classification
- Kingdom: Plantae
- Clade: Tracheophytes
- Clade: Angiosperms
- Clade: Eudicots
- Clade: Asterids
- Order: Gentianales
- Family: Gentianaceae
- Genus: Frasera
- Species: F. neglecta

Binomial name
- Frasera neglecta H.M.Hall

Synonyms
- Swertia neglecta

Species of plant

Frasera neglecta (syn. Swertia neglecta) is a species of flowering plant in the gentian family known by the common name pine green gentian.

The plant is endemic to California, where it is known from the Western Transverse Ranges in the Greater Los Angeles region, and the Southern California Coast Ranges.

It grows in chaparral, oak woodlands, and other habitats.

== Description ==
Frasera neglecta is a perennial herb producing one or more erect stems from a rosetted base, reaching up to roughly half a meter tall. The leaves are linear or lance-shaped and green with white margins; the largest leaves at the base of the plant can reach 20 centimeters in length.

The inflorescence is a dense panicle atop the stem, sometimes interrupted into a series of clusters of flowers. Each flower has a calyx of four pointed sepals and a corolla of four pointed lobes each up to 1.5 centimeters long. The corolla is greenish white with purple streaks. There are four stamens tipped with large anthers and a central ovary.
