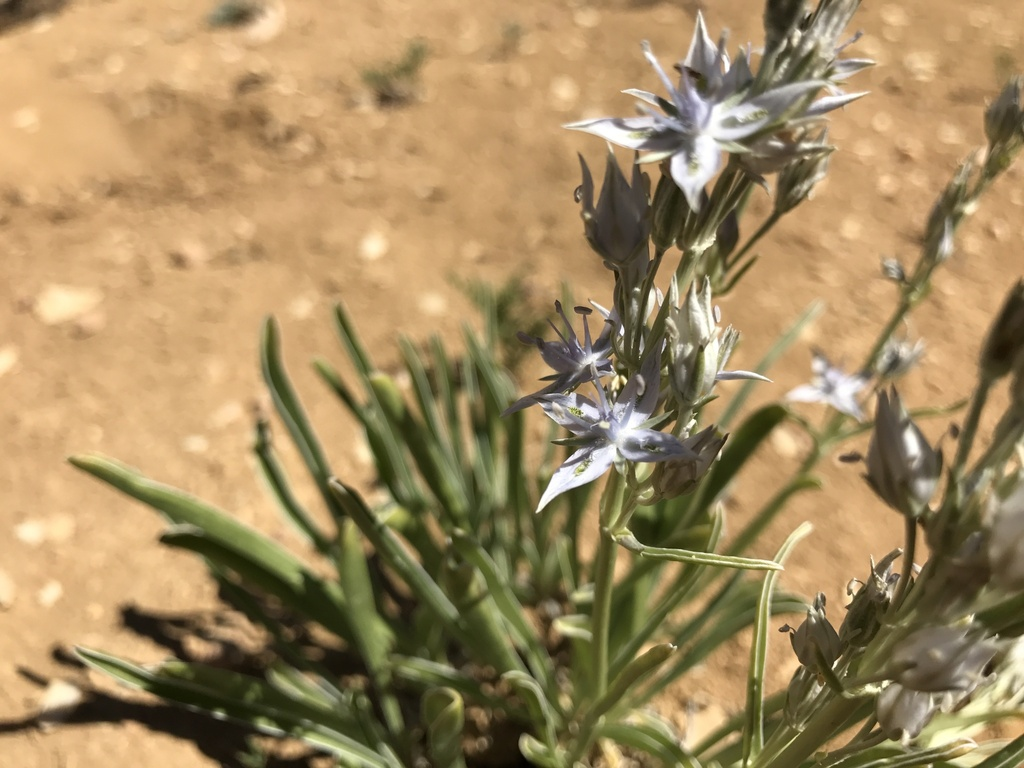
- Frasera ackermaniae in bloom

Conservation status
- Critically Imperiled (NatureServe)

Scientific classification
- Kingdom: Plantae
- Clade: Tracheophytes
- Clade: Angiosperms
- Clade: Eudicots
- Clade: Asterids
- Order: Gentianales
- Family: Gentianaceae
- Genus: Frasera
- Species: F. ackermaniae

Binomial name
- Frasera ackermaniae C.C.Newb. & Goodrich

Synonyms
- Frasera ackermanae C.C.Newb. & Goodrich, original spelling; Swertia ackermanae (C.C.Newb. & Goodrich) S.L.Welsh

= Frasera ackermaniae =

Rare species of flowering plant

Frasera ackermaniae, commonly known as Ackerman green gentian, is a rare species of flowering plant in the family Gentianaceae. It is a small perennial herb endemic to a very limited area of Uintah County, Utah. It is known only from semibarren clay hillsides in the Brush Creek drainage of the Uinta Basin.

NatureServe classifies Frasera ackermaniae as G1, or critically imperiled, globally. A count conducted in 2011 estimated approximately 9,000 plants. The principal threat is recreational off-road vehicle use.
