= Frasera tubulosa =

Scientific classification
- Kingdom: Plantae
- Clade: Tracheophytes
- Clade: Angiosperms
- Clade: Eudicots
- Clade: Asterids
- Order: Gentianales
- Family: Gentianaceae
- Genus: Frasera
- Species: F. tubulosa

Binomial name
- Frasera tubulosa Coville

Synonyms
- Swertia tubulosa

Species of plant

Frasera tubulosa (syn. Swertia tubulosa) is a species of flowering plant in the gentian family known by the common name Kern frasera.

== Distribution ==
The gentian is endemic to California, where it is known only from the southern Sierra Nevada, primarily within the Sequoia National Forest and Sequoia National Park.

The plant grows in open mountain areas, and in foothill chaparral and woodlands habitats.

== Description ==
Frasera tubulosa Frasera tubulosa is a perennial herb growing just a few centimeters tall to about a meter in maximum height. The pointed, lance-shaped basal leaves are up to 9 centimeters long. They are green with white margins, and they tend to have downcurved tips. Smaller leaves are arranged in whorls higher on the stem.

The inflorescence is an open panicle of flowers atop the stem. Each flower has a calyx of four pointed sepals and a bell-shaped corolla of four pointed lobes each roughly a centimeter long. The corolla is white or blue-tinged with light blue veining. There are four stamens tipped with large anthers and a central ovary.
