= Macrocarpaea thamnoides =

Conservation status
- Vulnerable (IUCN 2.3)

Scientific classification
- Kingdom: Plantae
- Clade: Tracheophytes
- Clade: Angiosperms
- Clade: Eudicots
- Clade: Asterids
- Order: Gentianales
- Family: Gentianaceae
- Genus: Macrocarpaea
- Species: M. thamnoides

Binomial name
- Macrocarpaea thamnoides (Griseb.) Gilg

Synonyms
- Helia thamnoides (Griseb.) Kuntze; Lisianthius thamnoides Griseb.; Helia hartii (Krug & Urb.) Kuntze; Macrocarpaea hartii Krug & Urb.

Species of plant

Macrocarpaea thamnoides is a species of plant in the family Gentianaceae. It is endemic to Jamaica. It is threatened by habitat loss.
