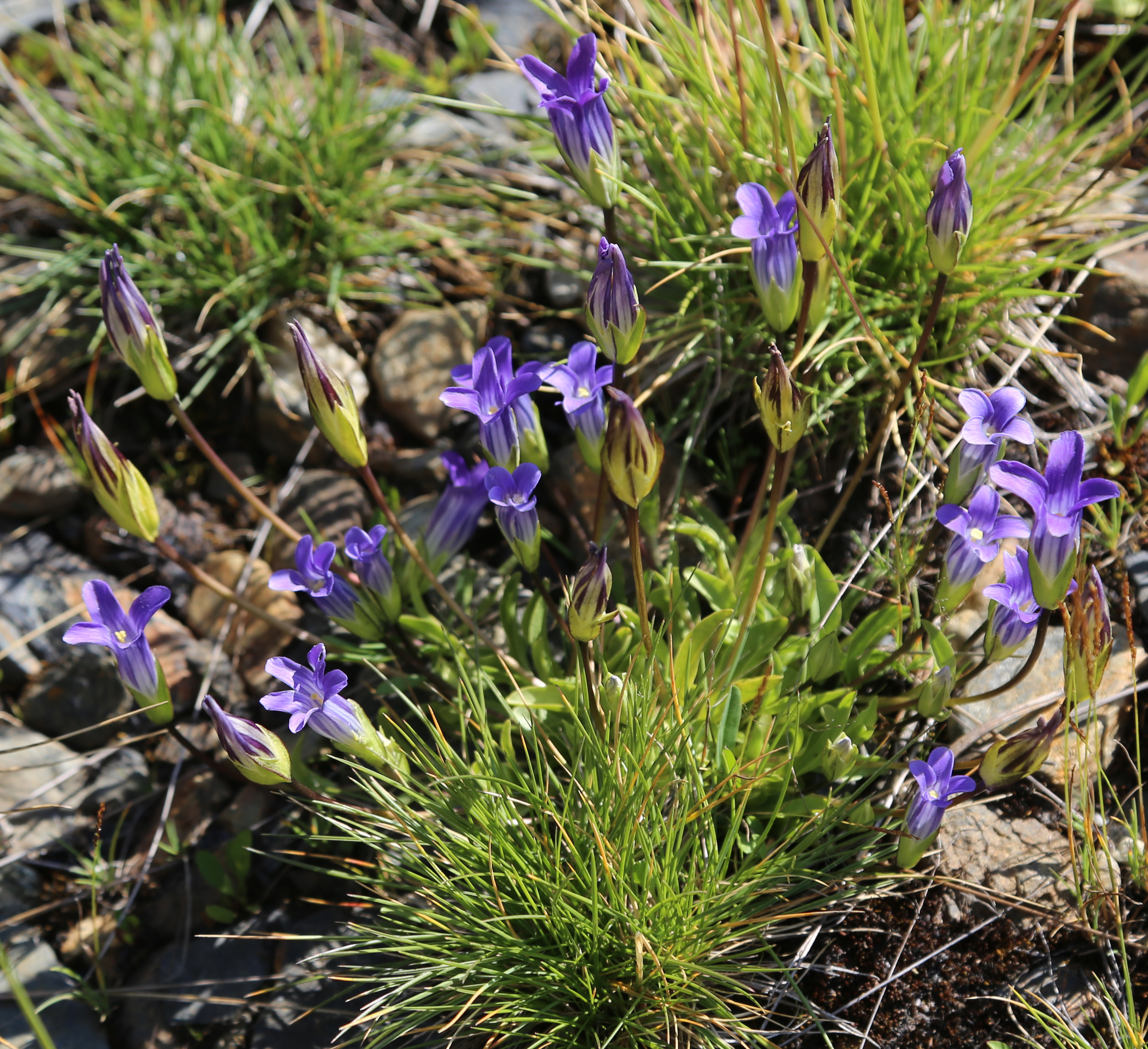

Scientific classification
- Kingdom: Plantae
- Clade: Tracheophytes
- Clade: Angiosperms
- Clade: Eudicots
- Clade: Asterids
- Order: Gentianales
- Family: Gentianaceae
- Genus: Gentianopsis
- Species: G. holopetala

Binomial name
- Gentianopsis holopetala (Gray) H.H.Iltis

Synonyms
- Gentiana holopetala

= Gentianopsis holopetala =

Species of plant

Gentianopsis holopetala is a species of flowering plant in the gentian family known by the common names Sierra fringed gentian or just "Sierra gentian"'. It is native to the Sierra Nevada and adjacent mountains in California and Nevada, in wet meadows from 6000 to 11,000 ft in elevation. This is an annual or perennial herb, growing stems which may be anywhere from a few centimeters long to nearly half a meter, and may lay along the ground or grow erect. Its small oval or spoon-shaped leaves are mostly basal but may grow sparsely further along the stem.

Each flower grows at the end of a long peduncle, which may be longer than the actual stem. The flower is trumpet shaped and up to 5 centimeters long. It narrows at the mouth and opens into a corolla, with 4 lobes each about half as long as the tube. The flower is any shade of purple or blue, and has longitudinal striping of varied shades of purple to nearly white (see image detail at left). The throat inside the trumpet may be white. The 4 green sepals are pointed, with a dark stipe. The fruit is a capsule containing several bumpy seeds.

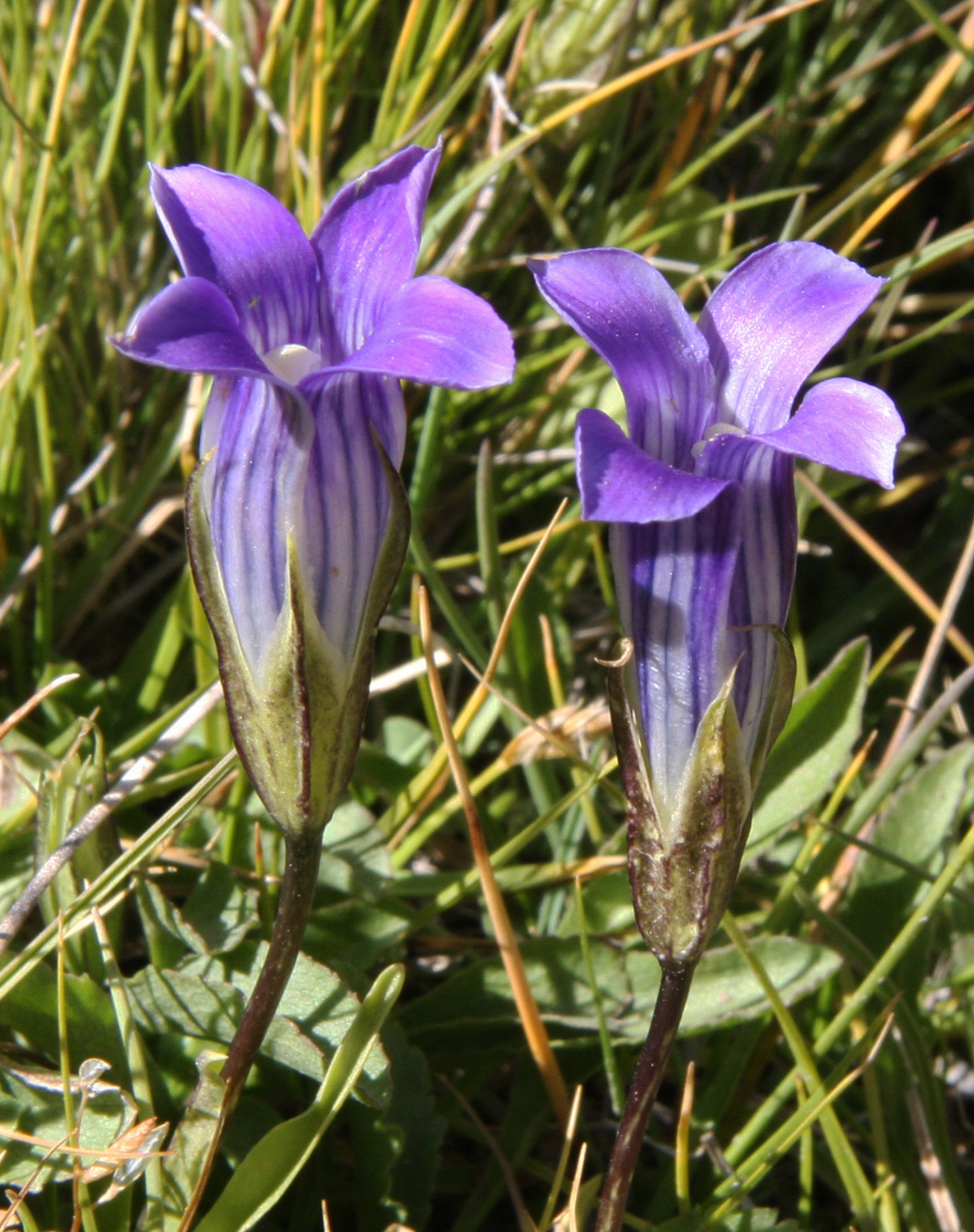
Gentianopsis holopetala flower detail
