= Halenia pulchella =

Conservation status
- Least Concern (IUCN 3.1)

Scientific classification
- Kingdom: Plantae
- Clade: Tracheophytes
- Clade: Angiosperms
- Clade: Eudicots
- Clade: Asterids
- Order: Gentianales
- Family: Gentianaceae
- Genus: Halenia
- Species: H. pulchella

Binomial name
- Halenia pulchella Gilg

Synonyms
- Halenia taruga-gasso var. laxiflora Cuatrec.

Species of plant

Halenia pulchella is a species of flowering plant in the family Gentianaceae. It is endemic to Ecuador. Its natural habitat is subtropical or tropical high-altitude grassland.
