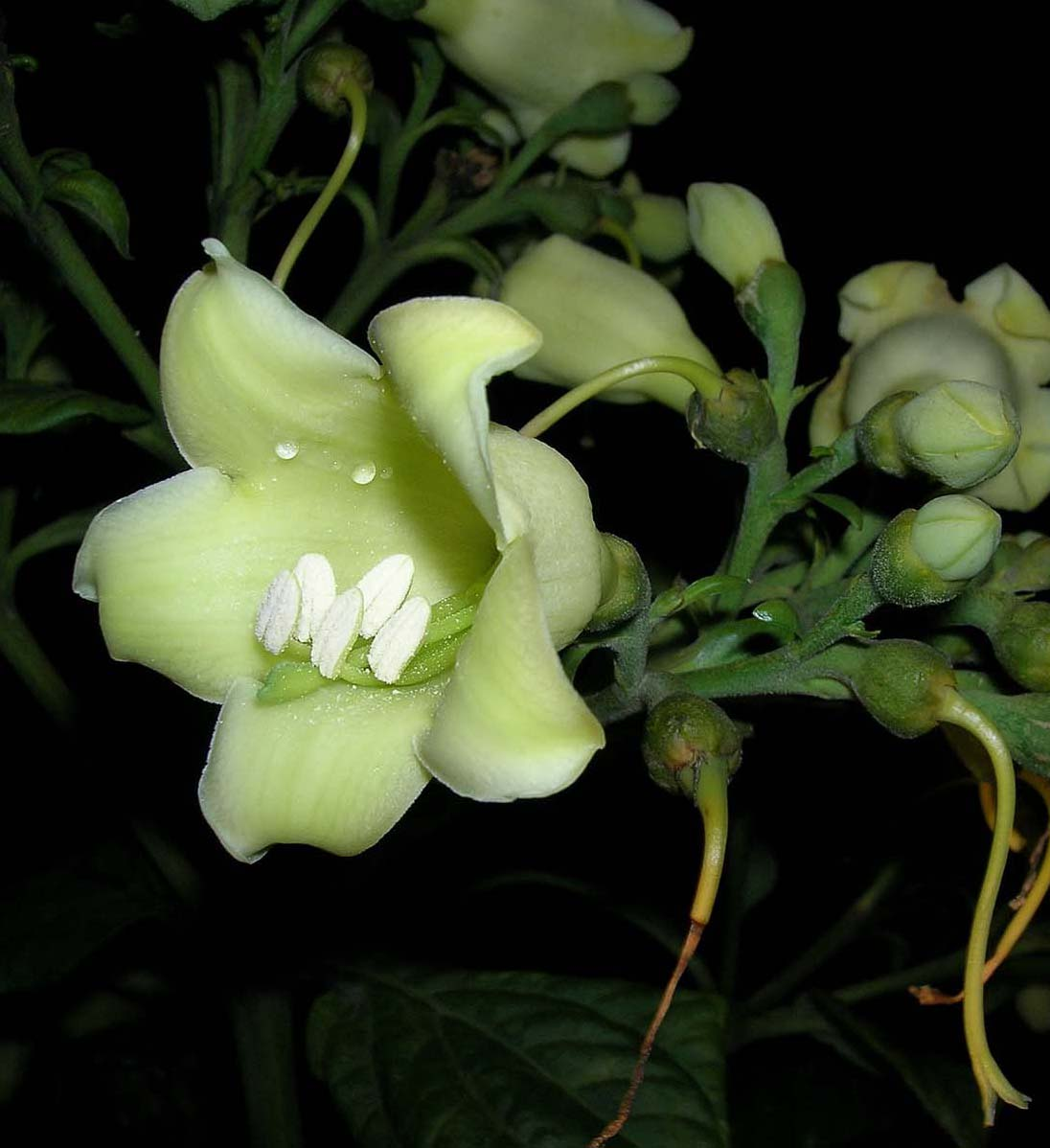
- A single M. apparata flower

Scientific classification
- Kingdom: Plantae
- Clade: Tracheophytes
- Clade: Angiosperms
- Clade: Eudicots
- Clade: Asterids
- Order: Gentianales
- Family: Gentianaceae
- Tribe: Helieae
- Genus: Macrocarpaea (Griseb.) Gilg

Species
- See species list below.

Synonyms
- Rusbyanthus Gilg

= Macrocarpaea =

Genus of flowering plants

Macrocarpaea apparata inflorescence

The genus Macrocarpaea, with 105 species and two hybrids of 0.5 m herbs, shrubs, epiphytes and small trees to 10 m tall, is the largest genus of the tribe Helieae of the gentian family (Gentianaceae). Species of Macrocarpaea have diurnal and nocturnal pollinators, visited during the day by hummingbirds, insects and butterflies, and at night by bats, moths and many different kinds of insects. The common name for the genus is 'Moon-gentian'. No species are known in cultivation.

== Characteristics ==
Species of this genus have white, cream, yellow to green flowers. Most have a large, open campanulate to funnel-form corolla adapted to nocturnal bat pollination. This genus is one of the few of the gentian family that have species with hairs on their leaves.

== Distribution ==
Macrocarpaea has a relatively broad distribution in mountainous regions of the Neotropics, the tropical parts of the New World in Mesoamerica and South America. The gentian tribe Helieae, to which Macrocarpaea belongs, is restricted to the Neotropics. The overall distribution pattern of Macrocarpaea is typical of many Neotropical taxa. The genus is found in five major geographic regions: the Andes [ranging from Venezuela, Colombia, Ecuador, Peru, to Bolivia] (85 species), southern Mesoamerica [Costa Rica and Panama] (6 species), the Greater Antilles of the Caribbean [Cuba, Dominican Republic, Jamaica] (3 species), the Pantepui of the Guayana Shield [Venezuela, and adjacent regions in Brazil and Guyana] (6 species), and southeastern Brazil (5 species).

== Highlighted species ==
Macrocarpaea dies-viridis "Named for the American punk rock music group Green Day, whose music we listened to, especially while driving to localities throughout Ecuador during out 2006 expedition". Published in Harvard Papers in Botany 11(2): 132. 2007. The common name for the plant is "the Green Day moon-gentian".

Macrocarpaea apparata Named for the verb to apparate, made popular in the book Harry Potter and the Chamber of Secrets by J.K. Rowling (1998) "When we first found this new species, we could only find sterile individuals. After looking all afternoon, and only just before dusk, we finally found several flowering plants that seem to have 'apparated' in front of us, appearing out of nowhere." Published in Harvard Papers in Botany 8(1): 66. 2003. The common name is the "Apparating moon-gentian". See photos to the right.

Macrocarpaea pringleana Named to honour Dr. James Pringle, Plant Taxonomist at Canada's Royal Botanical Gardens in Hamilton and Burlington, Ontario. Dr. Pringle has contributed extensively over a very long and distinguished career to both the systematics of the Gentian family and to floras of South America. Published in Harvard Papers in Botany 9(1): 11–49.

== Species ==
- Macrocarpaea affinis Ewan
- Macrocarpaea angelliae J.R. Grant & Struwe
- Macrocarpaea angustifolia J.S. Pringle
- Macrocarpaea apparata J.R. Grant & Struwe
- Macrocarpaea arborescens Gilg
- Macrocarpaea auriculata Weaver & J.R. Grant
- Macrocarpaea autanae Weaver
- Macrocarpaea ayangannae J.R. Grant, Struwe & Boggan
- Macrocarpaea bangiana Gilg
- Macrocarpaea berryi J.R. Grant
- Macrocarpaea betancuriana J.R. Grant
- Macrocarpaea biremis J.R. Grant
- Macrocarpaea bracteata Ewan
- Macrocarpaea browallioides (Ewan) A. Robyns & Nilsson
- Macrocarpaea bubops J.R. Grant & Struwe
- Macrocarpaea callejasii J.R. Grant
- Macrocarpaea calophylla Gilg
- Macrocarpaea canoëfolia J.R. Grant
- Macrocarpaea chthonotropa J.R. Grant
- Macrocarpaea cinchonifolia (Gilg) Weaver
- Macrocarpaea claireae J.R. Grant
- Macrocarpaea cochabambensis Gilg-Ben.
- Macrocarpaea densiflora (Benth) Ewan
- Macrocarpaea dillonii J.R. Grant
- Macrocarpaea dies-viridis J.R. Grant
- Macrocarpaea domingensis Urb. & Ekman
- Macrocarpaea duquei Gilg-Ben.
- Macrocarpaea elix J.R. Grant
- Macrocarpaea ericii J.R. Grant
- Macrocarpaea ewaniana Weaver & J.R. Grant
- Macrocarpaea fortisiana J.R. Grant
- Macrocarpaea gattaca J.R. Grant
- Macrocarpaea gaudialis J.R. Grant
- Macrocarpaea glabra (L.f.) Gilg
- Macrocarpaea glaziovii Gilg
- Macrocarpaea gondoloides J.R. Grant
- Macrocarpaea gracilis Weaver & J.R. Grant
- Macrocarpaea gran-pajatena J.R. Grant
- Macrocarpaea gravabilis J.R. Grant
- Macrocarpaea gulosa J.R. Grant
- Macrocarpaea harlingii J.S. Pringle
- Macrocarpaea hilarula J.R. Grant
- Macrocarpaea illecebrosa J.R. Grant
- Macrocarpaea innarrabilis J.R. Grant
- Macrocarpaea jactans J.R. Grant
- Macrocarpaea jalca J.R. Grant
- Macrocarpaea jensii J.R. Grant & Struwe
- Macrocarpaea jocularis J.R. Grant
- Macrocarpaea kayakifolia J.R. Grant
- Macrocarpaea kuelap J.R. Grant
- Macrocarpaea kuepferiana J.R. Grant
- Macrocarpaea lacrossiformis J.R. Grant
- Macrocarpaea laudabilis J.R. Grant
- Macrocarpaea lenae J.R. Grant
- Macrocarpaea loranthoides (Griseb.) Maas
- Macrocarpaea luctans J.R. Grant
- Macrocarpaea lucubrans J.R. Grant
- Macrocarpaea luna-gentiana J.R. Grant & Struwe
- Macrocarpaea luteynii J.R. Grant & Struwe
- Macrocarpaea luya J.R. Grant
- Macrocarpaea macrophylla (Kunth) Gilg
- Macrocarpaea maguirei Weaver & J.R. Grant
- Macrocarpaea marahuacae Struwe & V.A. Albert
- Macrocarpaea maryae J.R. Grant
- Macrocarpaea micrantha Gilg
- Macrocarpaea neblinae Maguire & Steyermark
- Macrocarpaea neillii J.R. Grant
- Macrocarpaea nicotianifolia Weaver & J.R. Grant
- Macrocarpaea noctiluca J.R. Grant & Struwe
- Macrocarpaea normae J.R. Grant
- Macrocarpaea obnubilata J.R. Grant
- Macrocarpaea obtusifolia (Griseb.) Gilg
- Macrocarpaea opulenta J.R. Grant
- Macrocarpaea ostentans J.R. Grant
- Macrocarpaea pachyphylla Gilg
- Macrocarpaea pachystyla Gilg
- Macrocarpaea pajonalis J.R. Grant
- Macrocarpaea papillosa Weaver & J.R. Grant
- Macrocarpaea pinetorum Alain
- Macrocarpaea piresii Maguire
- Macrocarpaea pringleana J.R. Grant
- Macrocarpaea quechua J.R. Grant
- Macrocarpaea quizhpei J.R. Grant
- Macrocarpaea revoluta (Ruiz & Pavon) Gilg
- Macrocarpaea robin-fosteri J.R. Grant
- Macrocarpaea rubra Malme
- Macrocarpaea rugosa Steyerm.
- Macrocarpaea schultesii Weaver & J.R. Grant
- Macrocarpaea silverstonei J.R. Grant
- Macrocarpaea sodiroana Gilg
- Macrocarpaea stenophylla Gilg
- Macrocarpaea subcaudata Ewan
- Macrocarpaea subsessilis Weaver & J.R. Grant
- Macrocarpaea tabula-fluctivagifolia J.R. Grant
- Macrocarpaea tahuantinsuyuana J.R. Grant
- Macrocarpaea thamnoides (Griseb.) Gilg
- Macrocarpaea umerulus J.R. Grant
- Macrocarpaea valerii Standl.
- Macrocarpaea viscosa (Ruiz & Pavon) Gilg
- Macrocarpaea voluptuosa J.R. Grant
- Macrocarpaea wallnoeferi J.R. Grant
- Macrocarpaea weaveri J.R. Grant
- Macrocarpaea weigendiorum J.R. Grant
- Macrocarpaea wurdackii Weaver & J.R. Grant
- Macrocarpaea xerantifulva J.R. Grant
- Macrocarpaea ypsilocaule J.R. Grant
- Macrocarpaea zophoflora Weaver & J.R. Grant

== Catalogue of hybrids ==
- Macrocarpaea x acuminata J.R. Grant (M. subcaudata x M. valerii)
- Macrocarpaea x mattii J.R. Grant (M. noctiluca x M. subsessilis)
