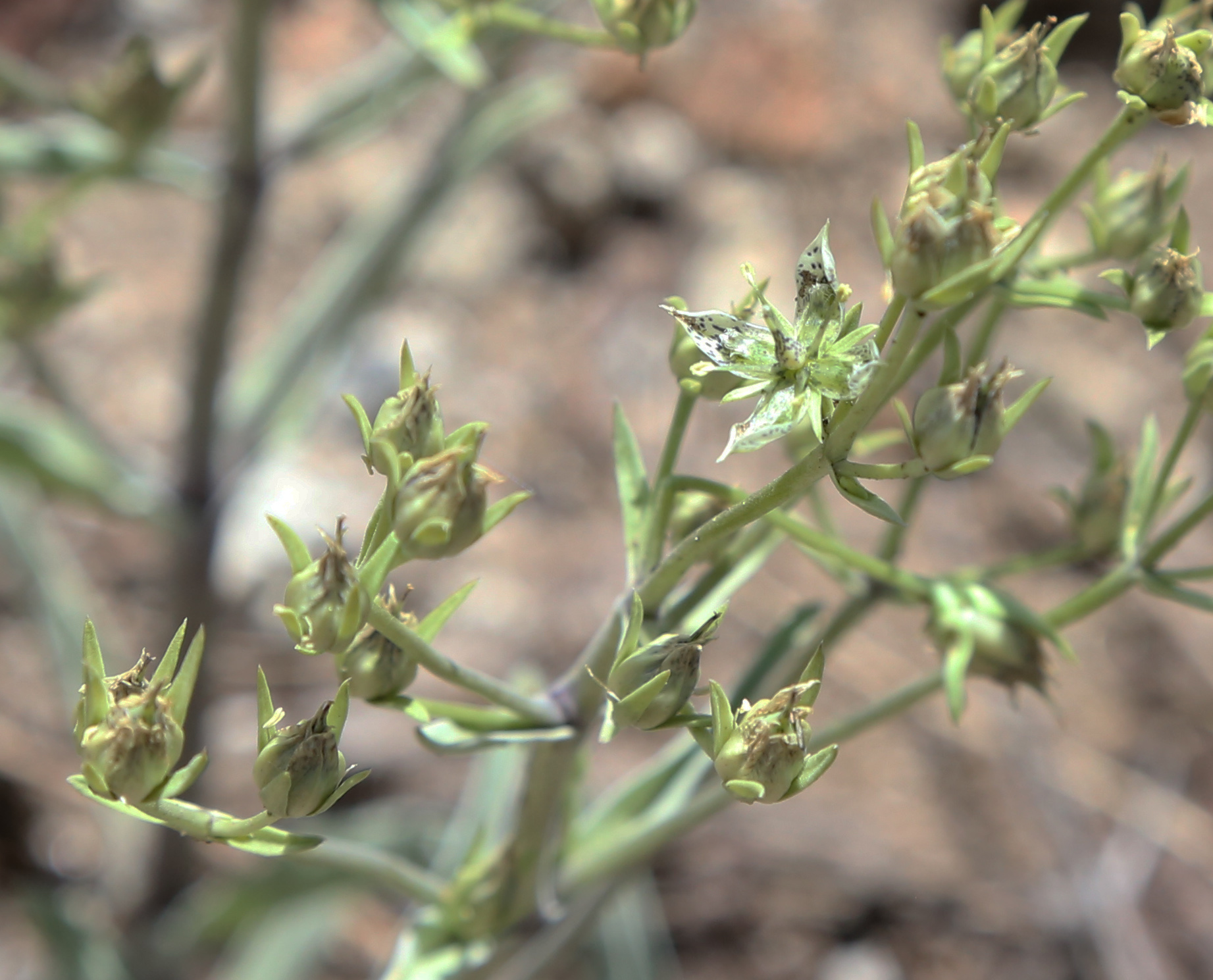

Scientific classification
- Kingdom: Plantae
- Clade: Tracheophytes
- Clade: Angiosperms
- Clade: Eudicots
- Clade: Asterids
- Order: Gentianales
- Family: Gentianaceae
- Genus: Frasera
- Species: F. puberulenta

Binomial name
- Frasera puberulenta Davidson

Synonyms
- Swertia puberulenta

= Frasera puberulenta =

Species of plant

Frasera puberulenta (syn. Swertia puberulenta) is a species of flowering plant in the gentian family known by the common name Inyo frasera.

It is native to the High Sierra Nevada of California, as well as the Inyo Mountains and White Mountains of eastern California, where its distribution extends just over the border into Nevada. It grows in dry mountain woodlands.

== Description ==
Frasera puberulenta is a perennial herb producing several lightly hairy stems 10 to 30 centimeters long. The leaves are green with white margins and have fuzzy hairs on the undersides.

The inflorescence is an open panicle of flowers atop the stem. Each flower has a calyx of four pointed sepals and a corolla of four pointed lobes each roughly a centimeter long. The corolla is greenish with purple dots, and each lobe has a fringe of hairs near the base. There are four stamens tipped with large anthers and a central ovary.
