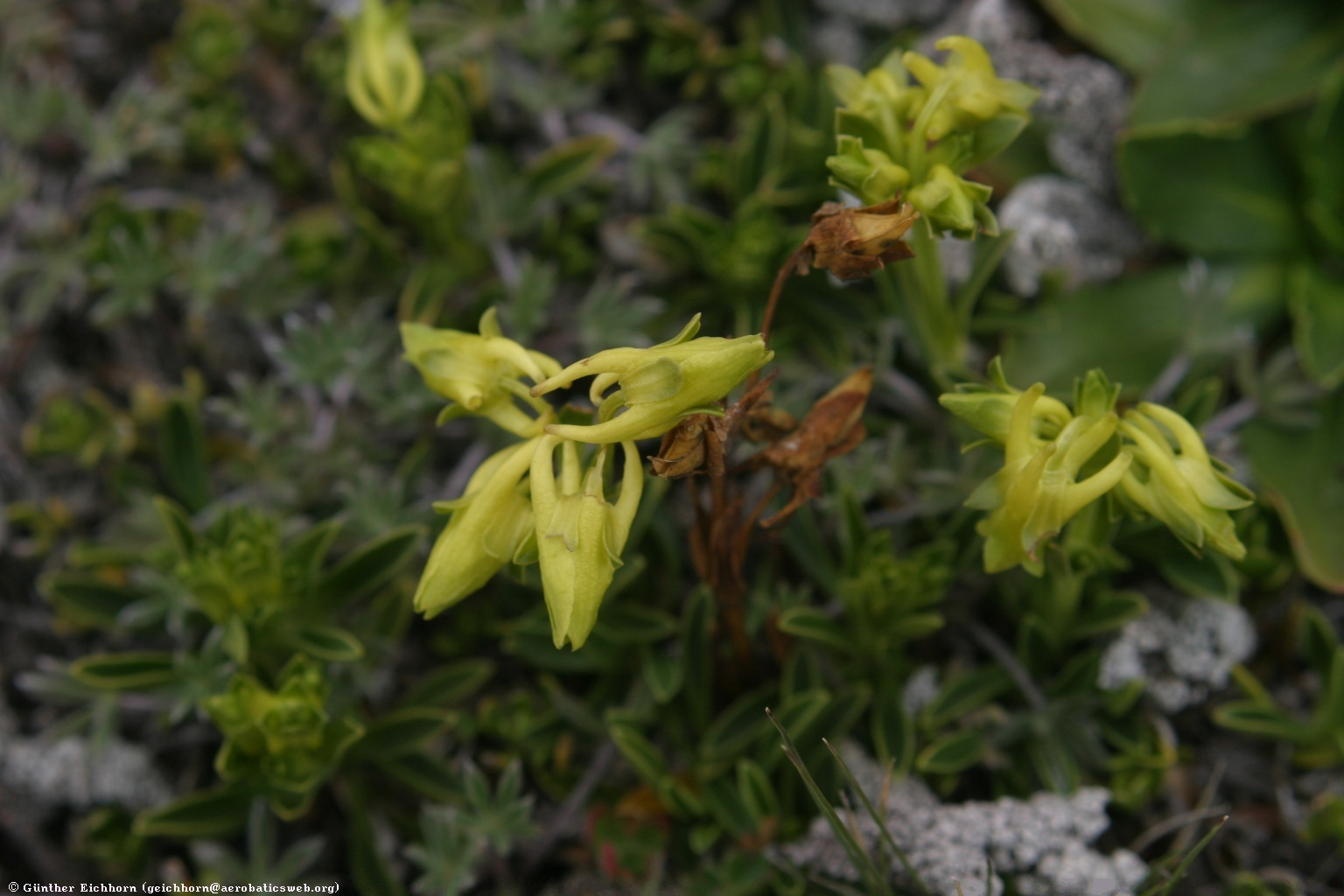
- Halenia weddelliana on Cotopaxi, Ecuador

Scientific classification
- Kingdom: Plantae
- Clade: Tracheophytes
- Clade: Angiosperms
- Clade: Eudicots
- Clade: Asterids
- Order: Gentianales
- Family: Gentianaceae
- Genus: Halenia
- Species: H. weddelliana

Binomial name
- Halenia weddelliana Gilg

Synonyms
- Halenia antigonorrhoica Gilg; Halenia hoppii Reimers; Halenia hypericoides Griseb.; Halenia meyeri-johannis Gilg; Halenia phyllophora C.K.Allen; Tetragonanthus hypericoides Kuntze

= Halenia weddelliana =

Species of plant

Halenia weddelliana is a species of flowering plant in the family Gentianaceae. Its natural habitat is subtropical or tropical high-altitude grassland.

== Distribution ==
Colombia, Ecuador, Peru, Bolivia.
