= Macrocarpaea harlingii =

Conservation status
- Vulnerable (IUCN 3.1)

Scientific classification
- Kingdom: Plantae
- Clade: Tracheophytes
- Clade: Angiosperms
- Clade: Eudicots
- Clade: Asterids
- Order: Gentianales
- Family: Gentianaceae
- Genus: Macrocarpaea
- Species: M. harlingii

Binomial name
- Macrocarpaea harlingii J.S.Pringle

Species of plant

Macrocarpaea harlingii is a species of plant in the Gentianaceae family. It is endemic to Ecuador. Its natural habitat is subtropical or tropical moist montane forests.
