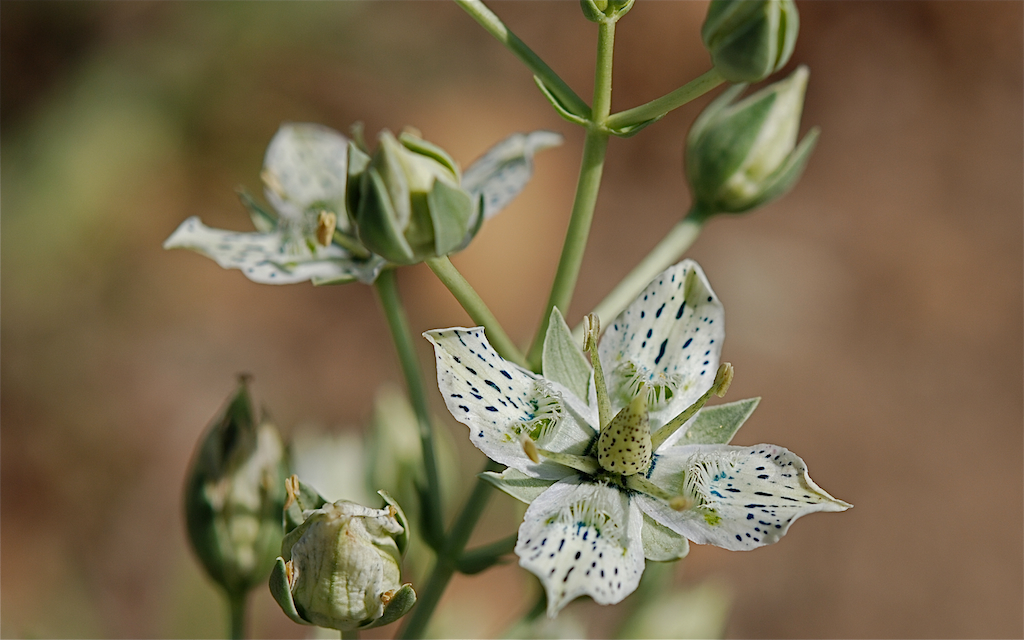

Conservation status
- Apparently Secure (NatureServe)

Scientific classification
- Kingdom: Plantae
- Clade: Tracheophytes
- Clade: Angiosperms
- Clade: Eudicots
- Clade: Asterids
- Order: Gentianales
- Family: Gentianaceae
- Genus: Frasera
- Species: F. parryi

Binomial name
- Frasera parryi Torr.

Synonyms
- Swertia parryi

= Frasera parryi =

Species of plant

Frasera parryi (syn. Swertia parryi) is a species of flowering plant in the gentian family known by the common name Coahuila frasera.

It is native to southern California and adjacent Baja California, and Arizona. It grows in oak woodland and chaparral habitats along the coast and inland.

== Description ==
Frasera parryi is a perennial herb that produces one or two erect stems growing up to 1.5 m in height.

The basal leaves are lance-shaped, strap-shaped, or somewhat oval and elongated with pointed tips, reaching up to 25 cm long. Leaves higher on the plant are widely lance-shaped to oval, smaller, and oppositely arranged. The leaves are green with white margins.

The inflorescence is an open panicle of flowers atop the stem. Each flower has a calyx of four pointed sepals and a corolla of four pointed lobes each 1 to 2 cm long. The corolla is greenish with purple speckles, and each lobe has a fringe of hairs near the base. There are four stamens tipped with large anthers and a central ovary.
