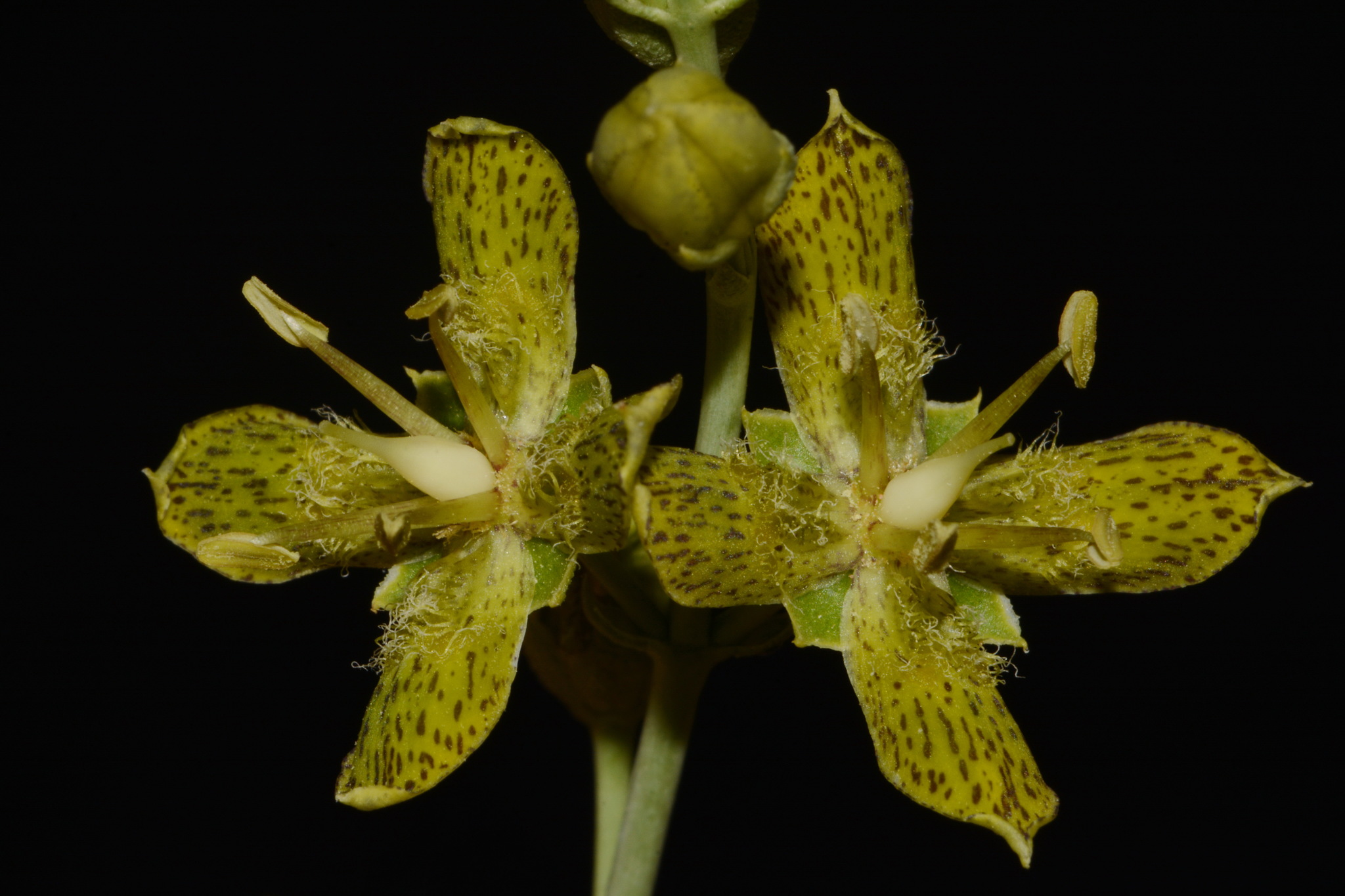
- Frasera paniculata close-up of flowers
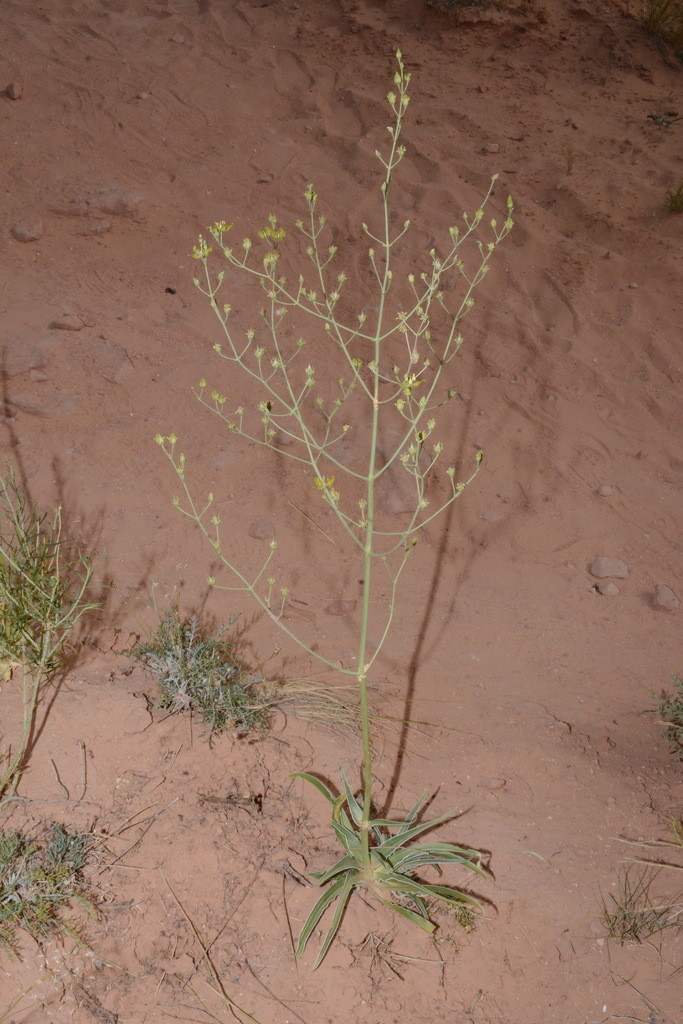
- Frasera paniculata (note the paniculate inflorescence)

Conservation status
- Apparently Secure (NatureServe)

Scientific classification
- Kingdom: Plantae
- Clade: Tracheophytes
- Clade: Angiosperms
- Clade: Eudicots
- Clade: Asterids
- Order: Gentianales
- Family: Gentianaceae
- Genus: Frasera
- Species: F. paniculata

Binomial name
- Frasera paniculata Torr.

Synonyms
- Swertia bigelowii Kuntze; Frasera utahensis M.E.Jones; Leucocraspedum utahense (M.E.Jones) Rydb.; Swertia utahensis (M.E.Jones) H.St.John

= Frasera paniculata =

Species of flowering plant

Frasera paniculata, commonly known as the tufted green gentian, tufted elkweed, or tufted frasera, is a species of flowering plant in the gentian family, Gentianaceae. It is a short-lived biennial or perennial herb native to the Four Corners region of the southwestern United States. Its range includes Arizona, Colorado, New Mexico, and Utah, where it grows in dry shrublands and pinyon–juniper woodlands.

NatureServe classifies Frasera paniculata as G4, or apparently secure, globally.
