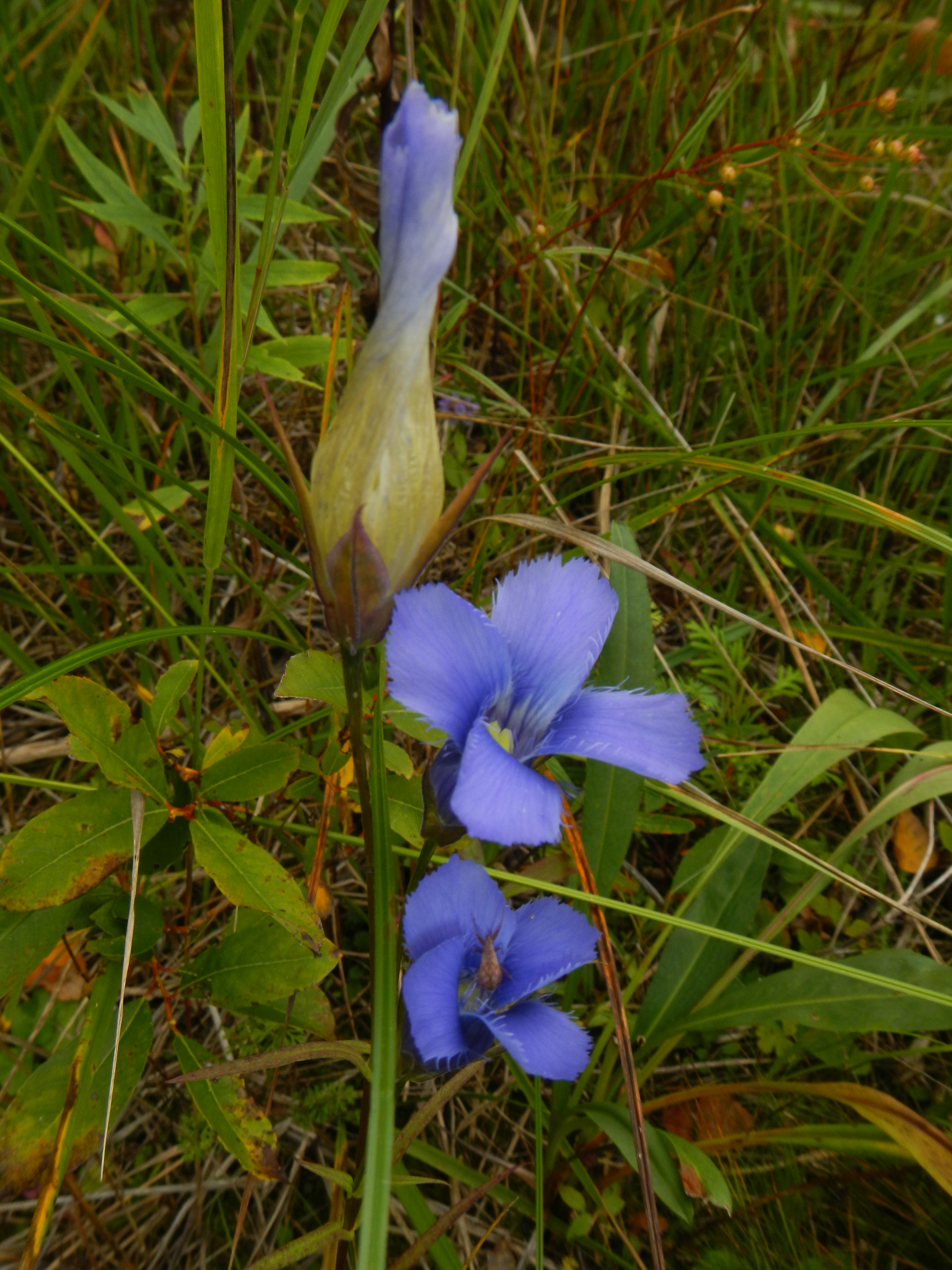

Conservation status
- Secure (NatureServe)

Scientific classification
- Kingdom: Plantae
- Clade: Tracheophytes
- Clade: Angiosperms
- Clade: Eudicots
- Clade: Asterids
- Order: Gentianales
- Family: Gentianaceae
- Genus: Gentianopsis
- Species: G. virgata

Binomial name
- Gentianopsis virgata (Raf.) Holub

Synonyms
- List: Anthopogon procerus (Holm) Rydb. (1931); Anthopogon virgatus Raf. (1837); Gentiana barbata var. browniana Hook. ex Macnab (1835); Gentiana crinita var. browniana (Hook. ex Macnab) B.Boivin (1966); Gentiana procera Holm (1901); Gentiana procera f. laevicalyx Fernald (1930); Gentianella crinita subsp. procera (Holm) J.M.Gillett (1957); Gentianella procera (Holm) Hiitonen (1950); Gentianopsis crinita subsp. procera (Holm) Á.Löve & D.Löve (1982); Gentianopsis procera (Holm) Ma (1951)

= Gentianopsis virgata =

Plant species in the gentian family

Gentianopsis virgata, commonly known as lesser fringed gentian, narrow-leaved fringed gentian, or smaller fringed gentian, is a biennial herbaceous species of plant, native to eastern USA and eastern Canada.

== Taxonomy ==
Broadly transcribed, Gentianopsis crinita (Froel.) Ma is an eastern North American species complex, containing a group of closely related taxa, including G. virgata. Further species were described in the past, but a lack of difference in nrDNA and morphology does not support their recognition. Three subspecies are currently recognized:

- Gentianopsis virgata (Raf.) Holub subsp. virgata
- Gentianopsis virgata subsp. victorinii (Fernald) Lammers
- Gentianopsis virgata subsp. macounii (Holm) J.S. Pringle
