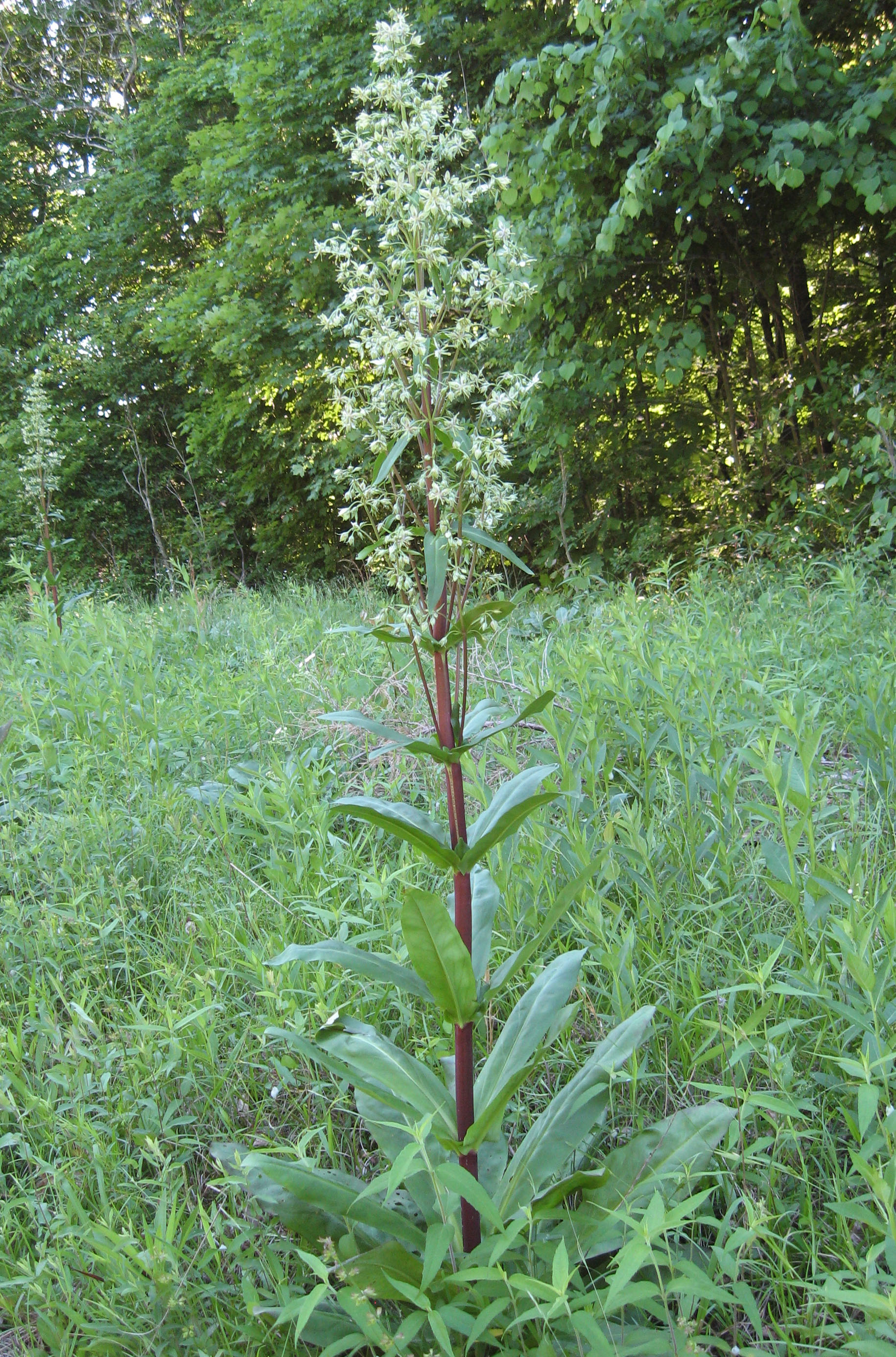

Conservation status
- Secure (NatureServe)

Scientific classification
- Kingdom: Plantae
- Clade: Tracheophytes
- Clade: Angiosperms
- Clade: Eudicots
- Clade: Asterids
- Order: Gentianales
- Family: Gentianaceae
- Genus: Frasera
- Species: F. caroliniensis

Binomial name
- Frasera caroliniensis Walter

Synonyms
- Swertia caroliniensis (Walter) Kuntze

= Frasera caroliniensis =

Species of plant

Frasera caroliniensis, commonly known as American columbo or yellow gentian, is a herbaceous perennial of the gentian family Gentianaceae found in the deciduous forest of Southern Ontario and throughout the eastern and southeastern United States. It was previously known as Swertia caroliniensis.

== Description ==
American columbo is a monocarpic perennial, meaning it flowers once after multiple seasons, and then dies. When it reaches the flowering stage, the 3 – 6 inch lanceolate leaves develop (usually in whorls of four) on a round elongated stem, and approximately 50 to 100 flowers will develop a panicle, with the fruits maturing soon after. The flowers that it produces are about 1 inch in diameter and folious (tall and "spike"-like), green to yellow with purple speckles. It is a perfect and complete flower, with four stamens and two carpels. The oblong-shaped seed capsule has a brownish color and is about 1/2 inch long. The entire plant can reach heights over 2 metres (7 ft). Though it is monocarpic, the plant may live for up to 30 years before flowering.

The roots of F. caroliniensis are a taproot system, with a thick and fleshy taproot, and in some Frasera species, this may be modified into a branched rhizome. The leaves of F. caroliensis are carried on stalks ("petiolate") and have a thick, waxy texture.

== Other names ==
It is also known as American calumba, American colombo, Radix colombo americanae, Frasera Walteri, Frasera canadensis, faux colomo, meadowpride, pyramid-flower, pyramid-plant, Indian lettuce, yellow gentian, and ground-century.

== Distribution and habitat ==
American columbo lives in dry upland areas, rocky woods, and areas with calcareous soil, though soil texture or other soil characteristics do not limit it. The species ranges from deciduous forest regions in southern Ontario, through southern Michigan, northern Indiana, southern Illinois, southern Missouri, southeast Oklahoma, southwestern Arkansas, and northern Louisiana.

== Human importance ==
Medicinal uses for American columbo have mostly been rebutted. However, it was a common belief in the early 19th century that the root of the plant might be externally used for gangrene. It was also claimed to be useful in treating jaundice, scurvy, gout, and rabies.

The dried root, which was official in the United States Pharmacopoeia from 1820 to 1880, is used as a simple tonic.

Frasera caroliniensis is chiefly known as an occasional substitute for calumba root, or Jateorhiza palmata, a native of Mozambique.

== Ecology ==
Several tree species are associated with F. caroliniensis, such as sweet-gum (Liquidambar styraciflua), tulip tree (Liriodendron tulipifera) and pignut hickory (Carya glabra). Even more vines and understory trees are associated with this species, such as eastern redbud (Cercis canadensis), strawberry bush (Euonymus americanus), Japanese honeysuckle (Lonicera japonica), Virginia creeper (Parthenocissus quinquefolia) and poison ivy (Toxicodendron radicans). Herbs associated with the species include the prostrate ticktrefoil (Desmodium rotundifolium), Christmas fern (Polystichum acrostichoides) and ebony spleenwort (Asplenium platyneuron). The canopy of trees that are associated with this species are important for its survival, though if the canopy becomes too dense the plant may not flower as well. When the plants do flower, they contain large nectaries, which aid in pollination.

== Conservation ==
This species is endangered in Ontario and nationally in Canada. The most extreme limiting factor for this species is invasive plants that are heavily infesting its habitat. This may be attributed to its long life cycle, which would not allow the species to adapt to rapid changes in the environment, and therefore not survive long enough to disperse its seeds. Also, this species has a "seed dormancy" (prevention of germination until optimal environmental conditions are present), that can only be broken in typical spring conditions. Furthermore, deforestation can be extremely destructive to the plants, as they rely on the canopy provided by the trees. Conservation practices to manage these issues include leaving surrounding trees within 4 square metres (43 sq ft), stimulating growth by cutting a small opening in the canopy, and draining overly flooded areas to provide clay-like soil.
