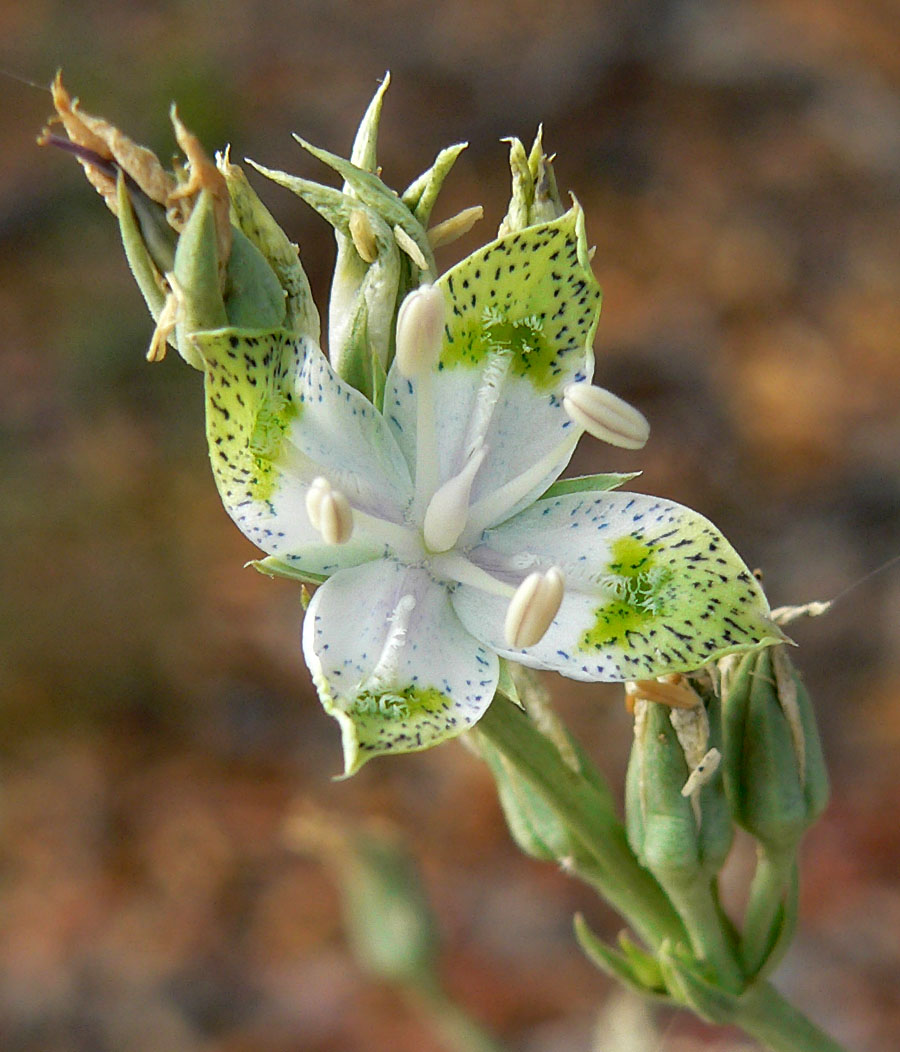

Conservation status
- Secure (NatureServe)

Scientific classification
- Kingdom: Plantae
- Clade: Tracheophytes
- Clade: Angiosperms
- Clade: Eudicots
- Clade: Asterids
- Order: Gentianales
- Family: Gentianaceae
- Genus: Frasera
- Species: F. albomarginata

Binomial name
- Frasera albomarginata S.Watson

Varieties
- Frasera albomarginata var. albomarginata; Frasera albomarginata var. purpusii Jeps.

Synonyms
- List: Leucocraspedum albomarginatum (S.Watson) Rydb. (1917); Swertia albomarginata (S.Watson) Kuntze (1891)

= Frasera albomarginata =

Plant species in the gentian family

Frasera albomarginata (syn. Swertia albomarginata) is a species of flowering plant in the gentian family known by the common name desert green gentian, or desert frasera.

It is native to the southwestern United States from easternmost California to Colorado and New Mexico, where it grows in open, dry areas, such as desert woodlands and grasslands.

== Description ==
Frasera albomarginata is a perennial herb producing one or more stems up to 30 to 60 centimeters tall. The leaves are green with distinct white margins. The basal leaves are lance-shaped, up to 9 centimeters long by one wide. Leaves higher on the plant are smaller and narrower and are borne in whorls or opposite pairs.

The inflorescence is an open panicle of flowers at the top of the stem. Each flower has a corolla of four pointed lobes which are greenish white, darker green at the tips, with purple speckles. There are four stamens tipped with large anthers and a central ovary. Flowers bloom April to August.
