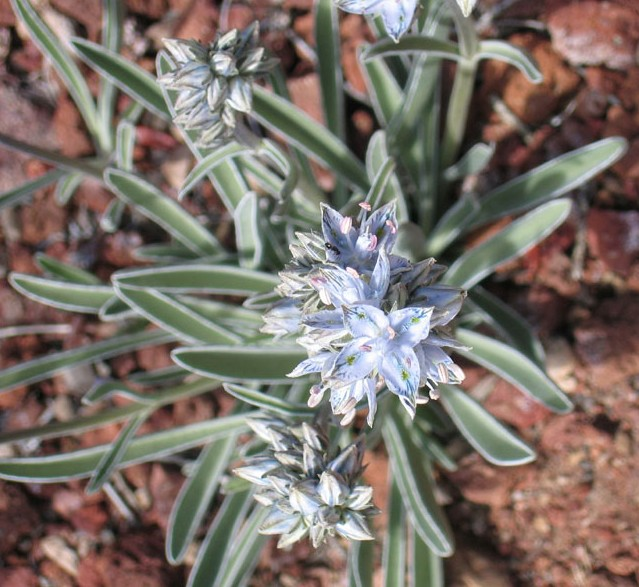

Scientific classification
- Kingdom: Plantae
- Clade: Tracheophytes
- Clade: Angiosperms
- Clade: Eudicots
- Clade: Asterids
- Order: Gentianales
- Family: Gentianaceae
- Genus: Frasera
- Species: F. albicaulis

Binomial name
- Frasera albicaulis Douglas ex Griseb.

Synonyms
- Frasera nitida var. albicaulis (Griseb.) Card; Leucocraspedum albicaule (Griseb.) Rydb.; Swertia albicaulis (Griseb.) Douglas ex Kuntze

= Frasera albicaulis =

Species of plant

Frasera albicaulis is a species of flowering plant in the family Gentianaceae. It is known by the common name whitestem frasera. It is native to the northwestern United States, where it grows in open areas in mountain habitat. It is a perennial herb growing from a woody base surrounded by rosettes of leaves, its stem growing 10 to 70 centimeters tall. The leaves are green with white margins. The basal leaves are lance-shaped, up to 30 centimeters long, and borne on petioles. Leaves higher on the stem are smaller and narrower and are oppositely arranged. The inflorescence is a dense panicle atop the stem, sometimes interrupted into a series of clusters of flowers. Each flower has a calyx of four pointed sepals and a corolla of four pointed lobes each one half to one centimeter long. The corolla is pale greenish white to light blue to purple, often dotted, streaked, or veined with darker blue. There are four stamens tipped with large anthers and a central ovary.
