= Halenia taruga-gasso =

Conservation status
- Near Threatened (IUCN 3.1)

Scientific classification
- Kingdom: Plantae
- Clade: Tracheophytes
- Clade: Angiosperms
- Clade: Eudicots
- Clade: Asterids
- Order: Gentianales
- Family: Gentianaceae
- Genus: Halenia
- Species: H. taruga-gasso

Binomial name
- Halenia taruga-gasso Gilg

Species of plant

Halenia taruga-gasso is a species of plant in the Gentianaceae family. It is endemic to Ecuador. Its natural habitat is subtropical or tropical high-altitude grassland.
