= Macrocarpaea lenae =

Scientific classification
- Kingdom: Plantae
- Clade: Tracheophytes
- Clade: Angiosperms
- Clade: Eudicots
- Clade: Asterids
- Order: Gentianales
- Family: Gentianaceae
- Genus: Macrocarpaea
- Species: M. lenae

Binomial name
- Macrocarpaea lenae J.R.Grant

Species of plant

Macrocarpaea lenae is a species of plant in the family Gentianaceae. Macrocarpaea lenae is found in Ecuador and grows primarily in wet tropical biomes.
