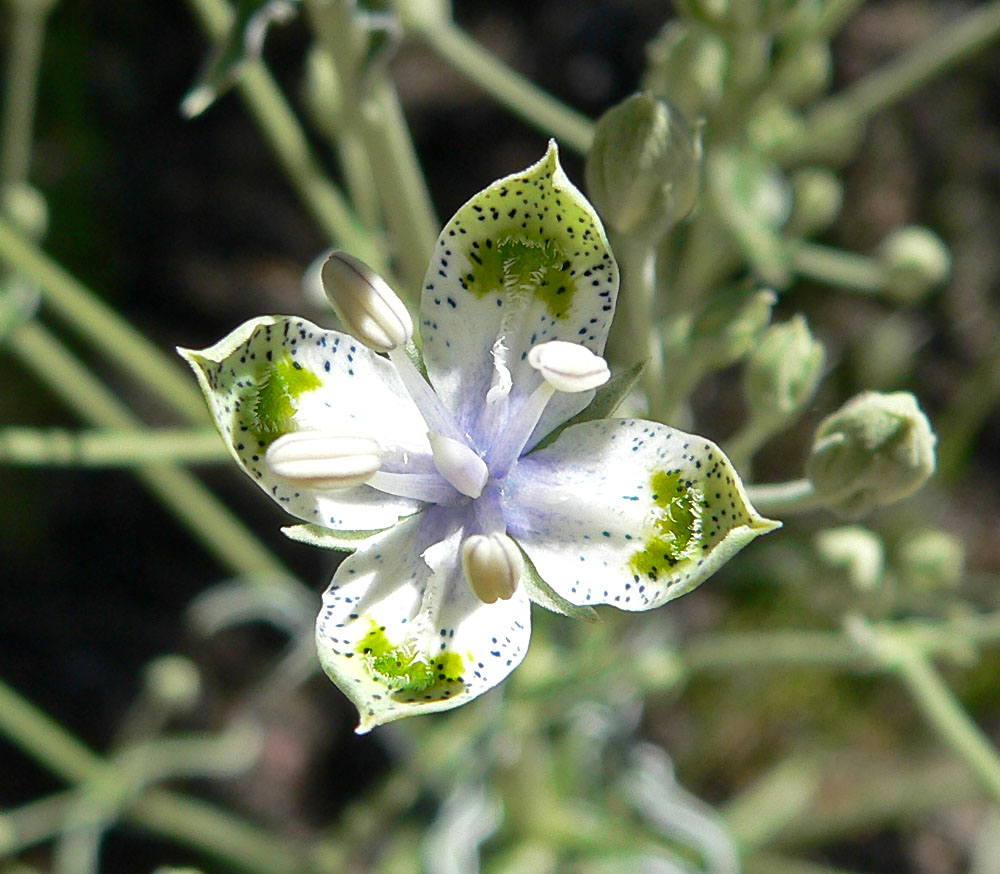
- Flower of Frasera albomarginata

Scientific classification
- Kingdom: Plantae
- Clade: Tracheophytes
- Clade: Angiosperms
- Clade: Eudicots
- Clade: Asterids
- Order: Gentianales
- Family: Gentianaceae
- Tribe: Gentianeae
- Subtribe: Swertiinae
- Genus: Frasera; Walter

Type species
- Frasera caroliniensis Walter

Species
- See text Sources: GRIN, ING,

= Frasera =

Genus of plants

Frasera, the green gentians, is a genus in the gentian family, native to North America and named for John Fraser, a Scottish botanist and colleague of Thomas Walter.

== Taxonomy ==
Historically, Frasera has sometimes been considered part of Swertia, but molecular analysis of a number of Frasera species has shown them to form a monophyletic clade separate from the rest of Swertia.

=== Species ===
- Frasera ackermaniae
- Frasera albicaulis
- Frasera albomarginata
- Frasera caroliniensis
- Frasera coloradensis
- Frasera fastigiata
- Frasera gypsicola
- Frasera montana
- Frasera neglecta
- Frasera puberulenta
- Frasera pahutensis
- Frasera paniculata
- Frasera parryi
- Frasera speciosa
- Frasera tubulosa
- Frasera umpquaensis
