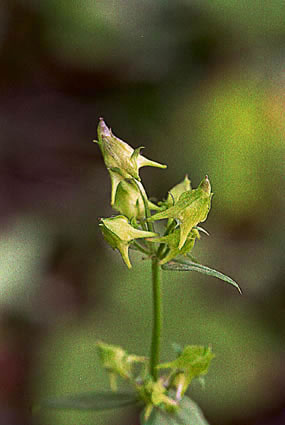
- Halenia deflexa at Isle Royale National Park, Michigan

Scientific classification
- Kingdom: Plantae
- Clade: Embryophytes
- Clade: Tracheophytes
- Clade: Spermatophytes
- Clade: Angiosperms
- Clade: Eudicots
- Clade: Asterids
- Order: Gentianales
- Family: Gentianaceae
- Genus: Halenia
- Species: H. deflexa

Binomial name
- Halenia deflexa (Sm.) Griseb.

= Halenia deflexa =

Species of flowering plant

Halenia deflexa, also known as green gentian or spurred gentian, is a plant in the gentian family (Gentianaceae). This species grows in wetlands and moist forests across much of the northern United States and Canada. Its common names refer to the prominent spurs on its mostly green flowers, a feature common to all species in the genus Halenia. These spurs bear nectar to attract insect pollinators, especially bumblebees, but the flowers are also self-compatible and frequently self-fertilize.

== Description ==
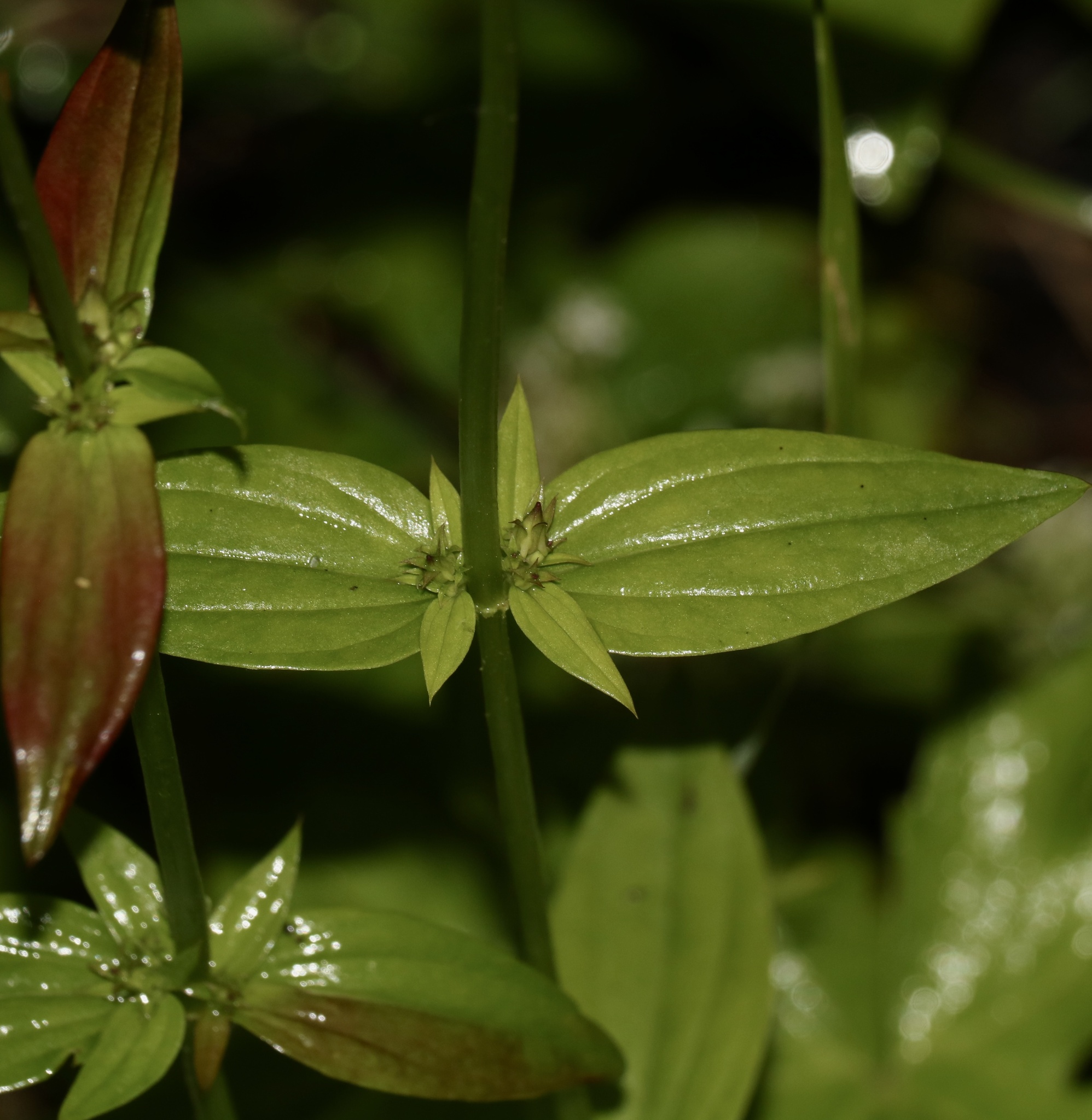
Cauline leaves of Halenia deflexa

Halenia deflexa plants have one erect stem, 0.2–9 dm (0.8–35.4 in) tall, which is typically unbranched but sometimes has a few short branches. The stems are hairless and have square cross-sections. Plants have both basal and cauline leaves. The basal leaves are spatulate or elliptic and are sometimes borne on short petioles, as are the lowermost cauline leaves. The cauline leaves are 1–7 cm (0.4–2.8 in) long and 5–30 mm (0.2–1.2 in) wide, and are elliptic near the base but gradually become narrow and lanceolate toward the end of the stem. The leaves are characteristically toothless, hairless, and glossy.

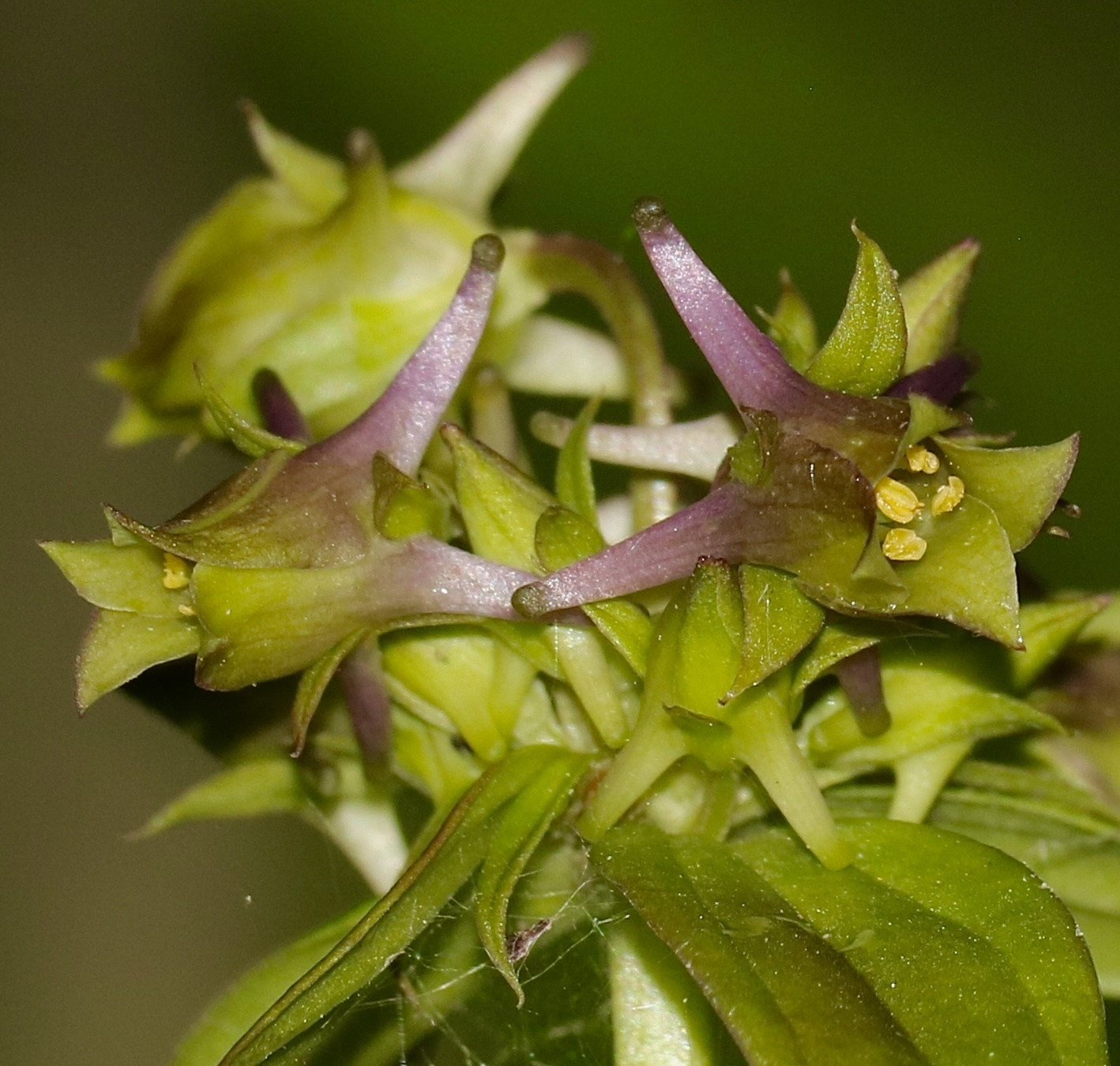
Halenia deflexa flowers in bloom

Flowering occurs from summer to early autumn. Each plant bears between 1 and 75 flowers, often arranged in several clusters of 2 to 9 flowers. At the end of the stem, the inflorescence forms a cyme, with a topmost flower blooming first, followed by the cluster of flowers below it; more clusters of flowers, called thyrses, are arranged at lower axils on the stem. Each flower is light green or purple and 8–15 mm (0.3–0.6 in) long with four petals. The petals are ovate and fused near their bases but flare outward at their tips. The base of each petal tapers to a narrow spur, 3–5 mm (0.1–0.2 in) long, extending back past the sepals and diverging at a 45° angle. These spurs, common to other species of Halenia, produce and hold nectar. The sepals are green and elliptic (adjoined between the spurs) and about half the length of the petals above the spur. Inside the tube formed by the fused petals, there are four stamens with yellow pollen.

The fruit of the plant is a capsule, conical in shape, which sticks out from the opening of the flower. The fruit is dry and, once ripe, splits open to release seeds. Halenia deflexa is diploid, with 22 total chromosomes.

== Ecology ==
Halenia deflexa flowers are self-compatible, meaning that they can fertilize themselves without the aid of pollinators. However, their nectar spurs also attract insect pollinators to help with outcrossing. The frequency of insect pollination decreases over the course of the flowering period, and late-season flowers mostly self-pollinate. Bumblebees, whose long probosces easily access nectar in the flower spurs, are the primary pollinators of H. deflexa. In the mornings, after the plants have refreshed the nectar supplies, hoverflies, which have shorter probosces, can also access the nectar; hoverflies account for approximately ten percent of insect pollination of H. deflexa.

Halenia deflexa is the host for at least two fungal pathogens. The leaf spot fungus Cercospora haleniae causes brown, circular spots with irregular edges on both sides of H. deflexa leaves. It has been reported in Manitoba (its type locality), Wisconsin, and Michigan and only grows on H. deflexa. A rust fungus, Puccinia haleniae, is also a specialist on H. deflexa and creates clusters of small, shiny black raised bumps on the stems and upper leaf surfaces of the host plant.

== Geographic distribution ==
Halenia deflexa grows in moist settings, often in calcareous soils, including in woods, swamps, and along the margins of bodies of water. It grows at elevations from sea level to 2000 m. Its geographic range includes much of Canada, from Atlantic Canada westward to British Columbia and the Northwest Territories, and the northern United States, from New England to Montana and Wyoming. Although the genus Halenia is species-rich, and the range of H. deflexa is broad, no other Halenia species occur sympatrically with H. deflexa.

== Taxonomy ==
J. E. Smith formally described Halenia deflexa as Swertia deflexa in 1816, although the plants were previously known to science and had been considered a North American population of the Eurasian species Swertia corniculata, now known as Halenia corniculata. August Grisebach transferred H. deflexa from Swertia to the genus Halenia in 1837, along with several other species.

In eastern Canada, some plants growing in exposed sites with rocky or sandy soils are smaller in stature, with shorter, thicker spurs, more densely-spaced leaves, and darker purple flowers. August Grisebach formally described these plants as Halenia brentoniana in 1839, and Asa Gray later reduced H. brentoniana to a variety of H. deflexa in 1878. Modern authorities do not recognize Halenia deflexa var. brentoniana, interpreting its morphological differences as responses to extreme environments rather than as taxonomically meaningful and noting many plants of intermediate character at less extreme sites in Canada.

== Conservation ==
Globally, Halenia deflexa is considered secure, although the species is rare or threatened in some parts of its range. The species is considered endangered in New York and Vermont, and it may be extirpated in Massachusetts. In Wyoming, North Dakota, Labrador, and Nova Scotia, H. deflexa is considered threatened or imperiled.
