= Gentianopsis simplex =

Scientific classification
- Kingdom: Plantae
- Clade: Tracheophytes
- Clade: Angiosperms
- Clade: Eudicots
- Clade: Asterids
- Order: Gentianales
- Family: Gentianaceae
- Genus: Gentianopsis
- Species: G. simplex

Binomial name
- Gentianopsis simplex (Gray) H.H.Iltis

Synonyms
- Gentiana simplex Gentianella simplex

Species of plant

Gentianopsis simplex is a species of flowering plant in the gentian family known by the common name oneflower fringed gentian. It is native to the western United States, where it is most common in moist mountain habitats. This is an annual herb with erect stems which may be only a few centimeters or up to 40 centimeters in height.

The leaves are lance-shaped to oval and located at the base and occasionally along the stem. Each flower is borne at the end of a peduncle which may be quite long. The flower is one to four centimeters long and light to deep bluish-purple with white staining, especially inside.

The flower is somewhat trumpet shaped, with a narrowing toward the mouth. The lobes are fringed along the edges and may be in a twisted or pinwheel arrangement. The fruit is a capsule containing ridged, pointed seeds.
