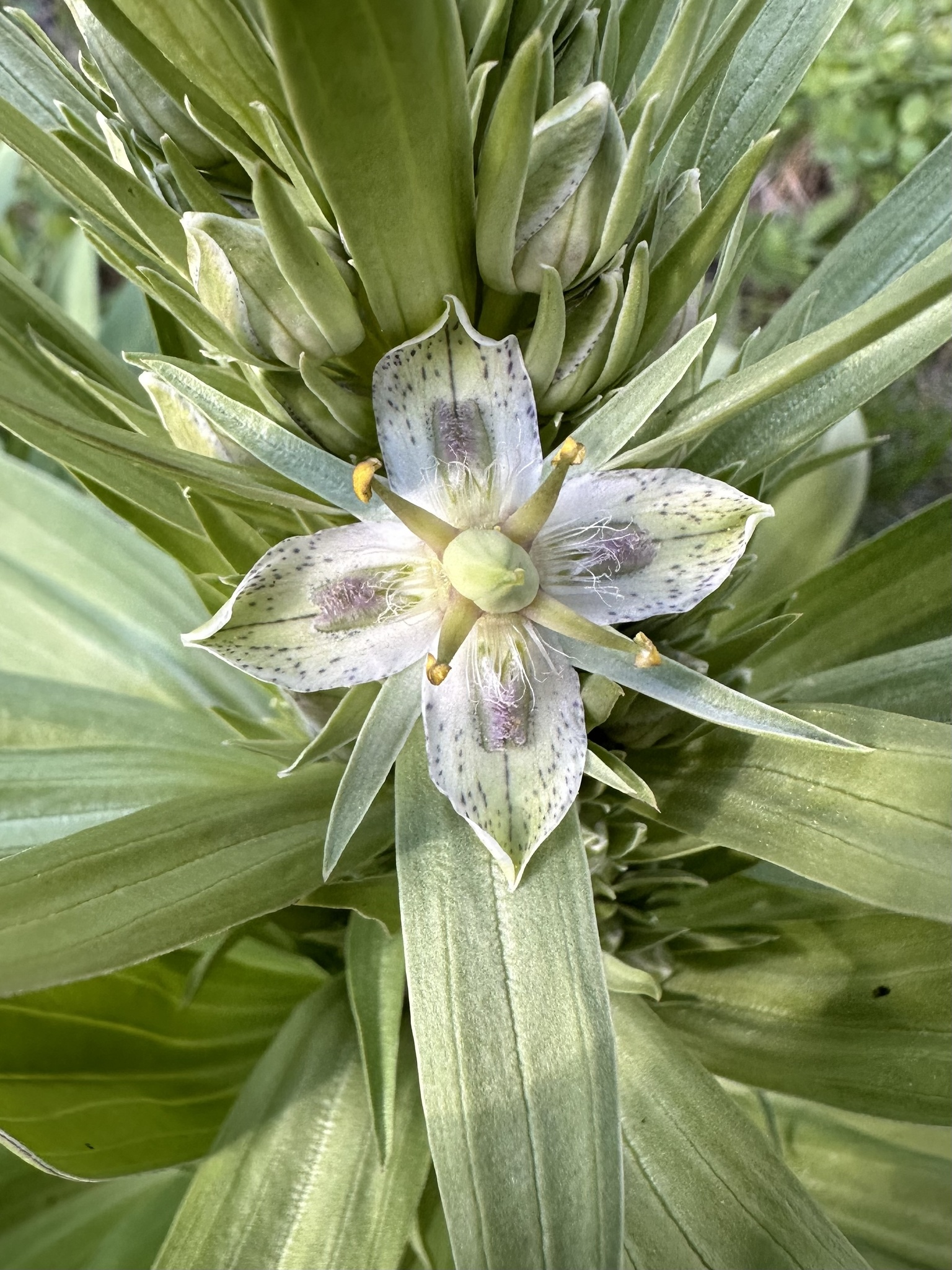
- Frasera speciosa flower photographed in the Whitman National Forest, Oregon

Conservation status
- Apparently Secure (NatureServe)

Scientific classification
- Kingdom: Plantae
- Clade: Tracheophytes
- Clade: Angiosperms
- Clade: Eudicots
- Clade: Asterids
- Order: Gentianales
- Family: Gentianaceae
- Genus: Frasera
- Species: F. speciosa

Binomial name
- Frasera speciosa Douglas ex Griseb. (1837)

Synonyms
- List: Frasera ampla Greene (1900); Frasera angustifolia (Rydb.) Rydb. (1906); Frasera macrophylla Greene (1900); Frasera scabra (M.E.Jones) Rydb. (1906); Frasera speciosa var. angustifolia Rydb. (1905); Frasera speciosa var. scabra M.E.Jones (1893); Frasera speciosa var. stenosepala Rydb. (1905); Frasera stenosepala (Rydb.) Rydb. (1906); Frasera venosa Greene (1900); Swertia radiata (Kellogg) Kuntze (1891); Swertia radiata var. macrophylla (Greene) H.St.John(1941); Swertia radiata var. maderensis Henrickson (1996); Tessaranthium angustifolium (Rydb.) Rydb. (1917); Tessaranthium macrophyllum (Greene) Rydb. (1917); Tessaranthium radiatum Kellogg (1863); Tessaranthium scabrum (M.E.Jones) Rydb. (1917); Tessaranthium speciosum (Douglas ex Griseb.) Rydb. (1917); Tessaranthium stenosepalum (Rydb.) Rydb. (1917); Tesseranthium radiatum Kellogg (1863)

= Frasera speciosa =

Species of flowering plant in the gentian family

Frasera speciosa is a species of flowering plant in the gentian family (Gentianaceae) known by the common names elkweed, monument plant, and green gentian. When blooming it grows a tall stalk with numerous flowers that have purple dotted green petals. Each plant can flower just once before it dies.

== Description ==
Frasera speciosa is a very large plant that flowers once before it dies (monocarpic), but may live for many years before flowering. Plants that are not yet ready to flower are made up of strap like leaves with short stalks in a low cluster (basal leaves). Though not as striking as the very tall flowering stalk, this stage of growth is quite unique in appearance and size in their range. The basal leaves are green with a waxy coating (glaucous) and 7–50 centimeters long and 1–15 centimeters wide. Their shape is like a spoon with a narrower base (spatulate) to being much longer than wide and with the widest portion near the tip (oblanceolate) with either a pointed or rounded tip.

Frasera speciosa has large dark colored fleshy roots that store starch for use when they bloom. The top of the root is a fleshy structure that may be branched so that a plant may have several rosettes.

Flowering is generally by plants with between 25 and 36 leaves in the previous season, but may occur in plants with twelves or more leaves. Mature plants have one, large, thick, flowering stem that has no branches. The flowering stem is also covered in leaves (cauline leaves) that start out large at the base and decrease in size towards the top. The stem leaves are arranged in three to six groups with bare stem in between (whorls) together with the flowers. At full size the flowering stem will be between a half meter and two meters tall. Flowering is synchronized among plants in an area, with widespread, picturesque blooms occurring periodically.

=== Flowers ===
The flowering stem is densely packed with blooms, the ones lower down on the stem will have small stems attaching them to the main stem (pedunculate) while the upper ones attach directly to the main stem (sessile). Each plant may produce as many as six-hundred blooms. The dish shaped flowers are found above the base of the leaves in each whorl. Frasera speciosa has flowers with four petals, silvery green or pale green in color with a variable amount of purple flecking or darker green spots, from almost none at all to nearly covering the petals. Each petal is 6–20 millimeters long and a narrow spear point shape with two nectar glands at the base. Between and behind each of the petal lobes are four very narrow and sharply pointed sepals, 9–25 millimeters long. Flowers do not have a noticeable fragrance.

Each fertilized flower produces an oblong fruit called a capsule that is 18–25 millimeters long. Each capsule contains approximately sixty seeds.

== Taxonomy ==
Frasera speciosa was described in an unpublished manuscript by the botanist David Douglas. Using the manuscript and specimens it was given a complete description by August Grisebach in 1837. He published this information in William Jackson Hooker's book Flora Boreali-Americana while giving Douglas credit for his work on the species, which is why it cited as "Douglas ex Griseb." in later botanical sources. As of 2024 this continues to be the generally accepted classification of this species. However, in some sources Hooker is credited with the description rather than Grisebach. No valid subspecies are recognized.

=== Names ===
The genus name, Frasera, was coined by Thomas Walter in 1788 in honor of the plant collector John Fraser. The species name, "speciosa", means "showy" in Latin. As a widespread and easily recognizable plant it has many common names. From the scientific name it is called "giant frasera". Related to its ecology it is called "elkweed", "deertongue", and "deers' ears". For its appearance it is called "green gentian", "monument plant", and "turret plant".

== Range and habitat ==
Frasera speciosa grows throughout the western United States and into northern Mexico. It grows in the mountains of the Pacific Coast states of California and Oregon, and also grows in Yakima County, Washington. In the interior states it can be found in much of Arizona, Nevada, and Utah. In the Rocky Mountains it grows in much of Idaho, western Montana, almost all of Wyoming, Colorado, and mostly in the northern parts of New Mexico. In the southern part of New Mexico it is only found in Grant County. It also grows in the Black Hills of South Dakota in three counties. The only part of Texas where it is recorded is Culberson County in the far west of the state. In Mexico it grows in four states, Coahuila, Nuevo León, Sonora, and Tamaulipas.

=== Conservation ===
NatureServe evaluated Frasera speciosa in 1986 and evaluated the species as apparently secure (G4) across its range. This means that at a global level it has fairly low risk of extinction due to an extensive range and/or many populations, but with some uncertainty about if there is any direction for population stability. They also found it to be secure (S5) at the state level in Montana and apparently secure (S4) in Wyoming. The only state where it was found to be vulnerable (S3) is Nevada. The rest of its extensive range has not been evaluated.

== Ecology ==
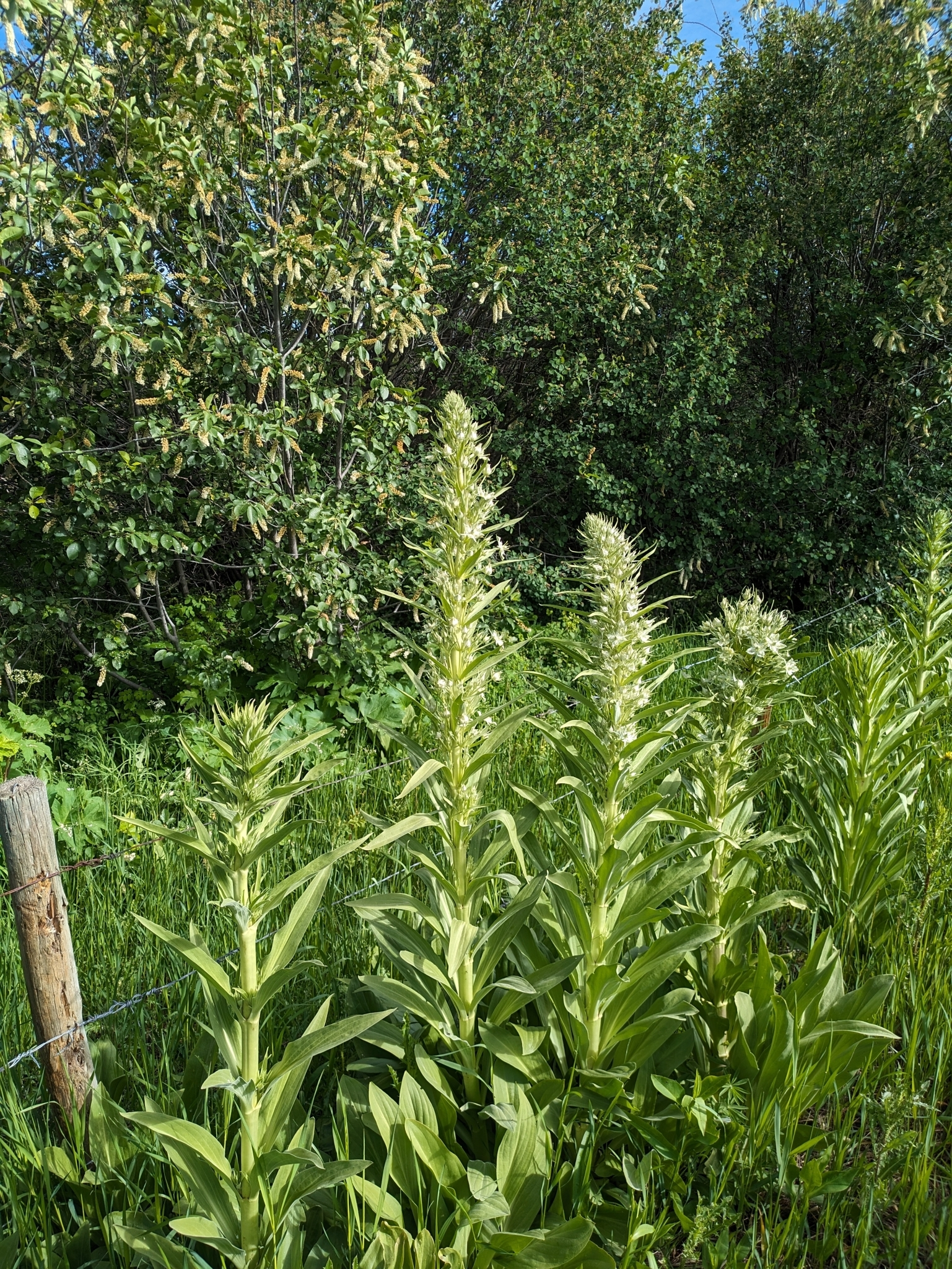
Four Frasera speciosa plants blooming near Clark, Colorado

Though, previously, thought to be a biennial plant, Frasera speciosa lives many years before flowering. Plants have a very high rate of death when seedings, but the average lifespan of plants is still 6.8 years. One population of plants in Colorado has been observed for 35 years. In that time some plants have still not flowered. From this the average age of flowering plants is estimated to be 40 years and the lifespan of some individuals to be more than 80 years. Through an unknown mechanism the plants synchronize their blooms in order to attract more pollinators and to be less of a resource for herbivores.

Plants usually have a fixed number of basal leaves, with studies finding them to have 2, 4, 6, 9, 12, 16, 20, 25, 30, 36, 42, 49, 56, 64, 72, 80, or 90 leaves, with numbers above 56 only found at lower altitudes. Plants do not always have more leaves when older, occasionally having fewer leaves than in a previous year. Leaves begin developing underground two to three years before they emerge.

Seeds are generally only deposited within two meters of the parent plant. The previous generation of plants also provide a favorable environment for seeds to germinate. Field observations found that twice as many seeds survived their first year of growth amid the debris left by the previous generation of plants as did in areas of bare soil.

The leaves of young plants are eaten by elk and cattle.

The flowers are visited by bumblebees such as Bombus centralis, Bombus rufocinctus, Bombus bifarius, and Bombus sylvicola to collect nectar with the shape of the flowers guiding the bees to make contact with the reproductive parts. They are a primary pollinator of this species. Bees in the genus Megachile and Anthophora terminalis also visit the flowers, but were observed to collect pollen rather than seeking nectar. Other frequent visitors include moths, flies such as Dilophus caurinus, the plasterer bee Colletes kincaidii, the mining bee Andrena thaspii, the orange-legged furrow bee (Halictus rubicundus), and Lasioglossum hemimelas.
