= Frasera fastigiata =

Scientific classification
- Kingdom: Plantae
- Clade: Tracheophytes
- Clade: Angiosperms
- Clade: Eudicots
- Clade: Asterids
- Order: Gentianales
- Family: Gentianaceae
- Genus: Frasera
- Species: F. fastigiata

Binomial name
- Frasera fastigiata (Pursh) A.Heller

Synonyms
- Swertia fastigiata

Species of plant

Frasera fastigiata (syn. Swertia fastigiata) is a species of flowering plant in the gentian family known by the common name clustered green gentian. It is native to the northwestern United States, where it grows in meadows, grasslands, woodlands, and forest openings. It is a perennial herb that grows 5 ft (1.5 m) tall. The basal leaves have oval or spoon-shaped blades up to 30 centimeters long by 10 wide. Leaves higher on the stem may be smaller and narrower. Some of the leaves have white margins. The inflorescence is a dense panicle atop the stem, sometimes interrupted into a series of clusters of flowers. Each flower has a corolla of four pointed lobes each roughly a centimeter long. They are greenish, often tinged with yellow or blue. There are four stamens tipped with large anthers and a central ovary.

The rare plant Frasera umpquaensis is often included in this species.
