= James Scott Pringle =

Canadian botanist (1937–2024)

James Scott Pringle (August 14, 1937 – September 3, 2024) was an American botanist and historian living in Canada. He served as plant taxonomist at Royal Botanical Gardens (Canada) in Burlington, Ontario, between 1963 and 2024.

== Education ==
Pringle completed his undergraduate education at Dartmouth College in Hanover, New Hampshire, United States. He then earned his Master of Science Degree in 1960 at the University of New Hampshire and his Doctorate in 1963 at University of Tennessee under the supervision of Aaron John Sharp.

== Career ==
Pringle joined the staff of Royal Botanical Gardens in 1963, as RBG's first full-time scientist.

Over the course of his career, he was binomial author or co-author of many species of plants. He named or updated the taxonomy of at least 100 species, subspecies, and sub-families of various vascular plants, mostly in the Gentian Family. He was also a published authority on the history of botanical exploration in Canada. He served as an adjunct professor in the Biology Department of McMaster University.

In 2004, a newly described species of tree, Macrocarpaea pringleana, was named in Dr. Pringle's honour. M. pringleana is a one- to five-metre tall member of the Gentian Family from the Central Andes, just north of the equator.

In 2015, a newly discovered species of Gentian native to the Himalayas, Kuepferia pringlei, was named to honour Pringle.

Dr. Pringle was also an historian interested in both science and black history. For example, in 2018 he co-authored A Noble and Independent Course, the Life of the Reverend Edward Mitchel, the first person of African descent to graduate from Dartmouth College and the Ivy League (University of Chicago Press) with Dr. Forrester A. Lee.
