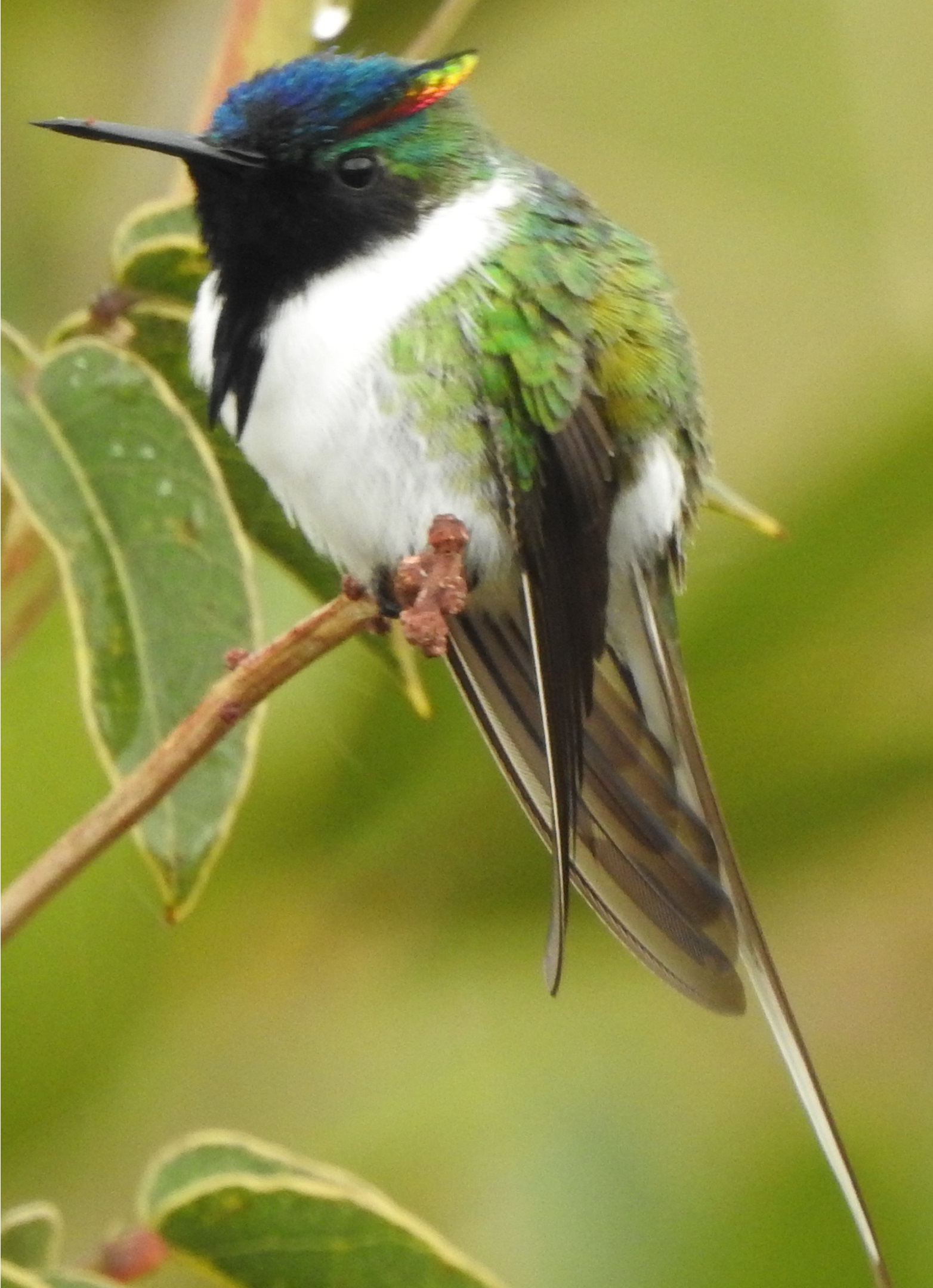
- Male in Bahia, Brazil

Conservation status
- Least Concern (IUCN 3.1)
- CITES Appendix II

Scientific classification
- Kingdom: Animalia
- Phylum: Chordata
- Class: Aves
- Clade: Strisores
- Order: Apodiformes
- Family: Trochilidae
- Subfamily: Polytminae
- Genus: Heliactin; Boie, 1831
- Species: H. bilophus

Binomial name
- Heliactin bilophus (Temminck, 1820)
- Range (year-round)

Synonyms
- Synonymy: Heliactin bilopha; Heliactin bilophum; Heliactin cornuta; Heliactin cornutus; Trochilus bilophus; Trochilus cornutus

= Horned sungem =

Species of hummingbird

The horned sungem (Heliactin bilophus) is a species of hummingbird native to much of central Brazil and parts of Bolivia and Suriname. It prefers open habitats such as savanna and grassland and readily occupies human-created habitats such as gardens. It recently expanded its range into southern Amazonas and Espírito Santo, probably as a result of deforestation; few other hummingbird species have recently expanded their range. The horned sungem is a small hummingbird with a long tail and a comparatively short, black bill. The sexes differ markedly in appearance, with males sporting two feather tufts ("horns") above the eyes that are shiny red, golden, and green. Males also have a shiny blue head crest and a black throat with a pointed "beard". The female is plainer and has a brown or yellow-buff throat. The species is the only one within its genus, Heliactin.

The horned sungem is a nomadic species, moving between areas in response to the seasonal flowering of the plants on which it feeds. It relies on a broad variety of flowering plants for nectar. If the shape of the flower is incompatible with the bird's comparatively short bill, it may rob the nectar through a little hole at the base of the flower. The sungem does also consume small insects. Only the female builds the nest, incubates the eggs, and rears the chicks. She lays two white eggs in a small cup nest which are incubated for about 13 days. The chicks are naked and black after hatching, and can fly when 20 to 22 days old. The horned sungem has been reported to readily defend territories both against members of its own species and against subordinate hummingbird species. The species is currently classified as least concern by the International Union for Conservation of Nature, and its population is thought to be increasing.

== Taxonomy and systematics ==
The horned sungem was named as Trochilus bilophus in 1820 by the Dutch zoologist Coenraad Jacob Temminck. This 1820 account only consisted of a figure plate illustrating a male specimen that was collected in 1816 by the German naturalist Prince Maximilian of Wied-Neuwied in Campos Gerais, Brazil. In the description of the new species that followed a few years later, Temminck and colleagues argued that the discovery of this species should be attributed to Wied-Neuwied, who was amongst the first travelers to bring specimens to Europe. In 1821, Wied-Neuwied published his own description of the species, which he named T. cornutus, but Temminck's name bilophus has priority as it was published one year earlier. In 1831, the German zoologist Friedrich Boie classified the horned sungem within the new genus Heliactin, as Heliactin bilophus, together with three other hummingbird species. Today, the horned sungem is recognized as the only member of Heliactin. In 1921, the French naturalist Eugène Simon mistakenly assumed that Temminck's figure plate was published in 1824 instead of in 1820, and consequently considered Wied-Neuwied's name cornutus as the valid one, which was followed in most subsequent publications of the 20th century. Even though this mistake was pointed out in 1999, some ornithologists felt that Temminck's name bilophus had become a nomen oblitum (forgotten name) and continued to use the established H. cornutus. The specimen originally illustrated by Temminck in 1820, now considered as the type specimen of the species, is part of the collection of the Naturalis Biodiversity Center in Leiden.

The generic name Heliactin derives from the Greek words helios meaning 'sun' and aktin meaning 'sunbeam', while the specific epithet bilophus derives from the Latin bi meaning 'two, double' and the Greek lophos meaning 'crest'. Bilophus, rather than bilopha or bilophum, is correct despite the mismatch between its apparently masculine ending and the feminine one of the genus. "Horned sungem" is the official English common name designated by the International Ornithologists' Union (IOU). The species is also known simply as the "sungem".

Within the Trochilidae (the hummingbird family), the horned sungem is a member of the subfamily Polytminae, which is also referred to as the "mangoes". The Polytminae comprises 27 species in 12 genera and is thought to have originated around 18 million years ago. Genetic analyses show that this subfamily can be sub-divided into three groups: the Colibri-, Heliothryx-, and Anthracothorax-groups. The latter two groups are mostly found in tropical lowland, while the Colibri group is found in mountainous areas. The horned sungem belongs to the Heliothryx group, together with the tooth-billed hummingbird, the black-eared fairy, and the purple-crowned fairy.

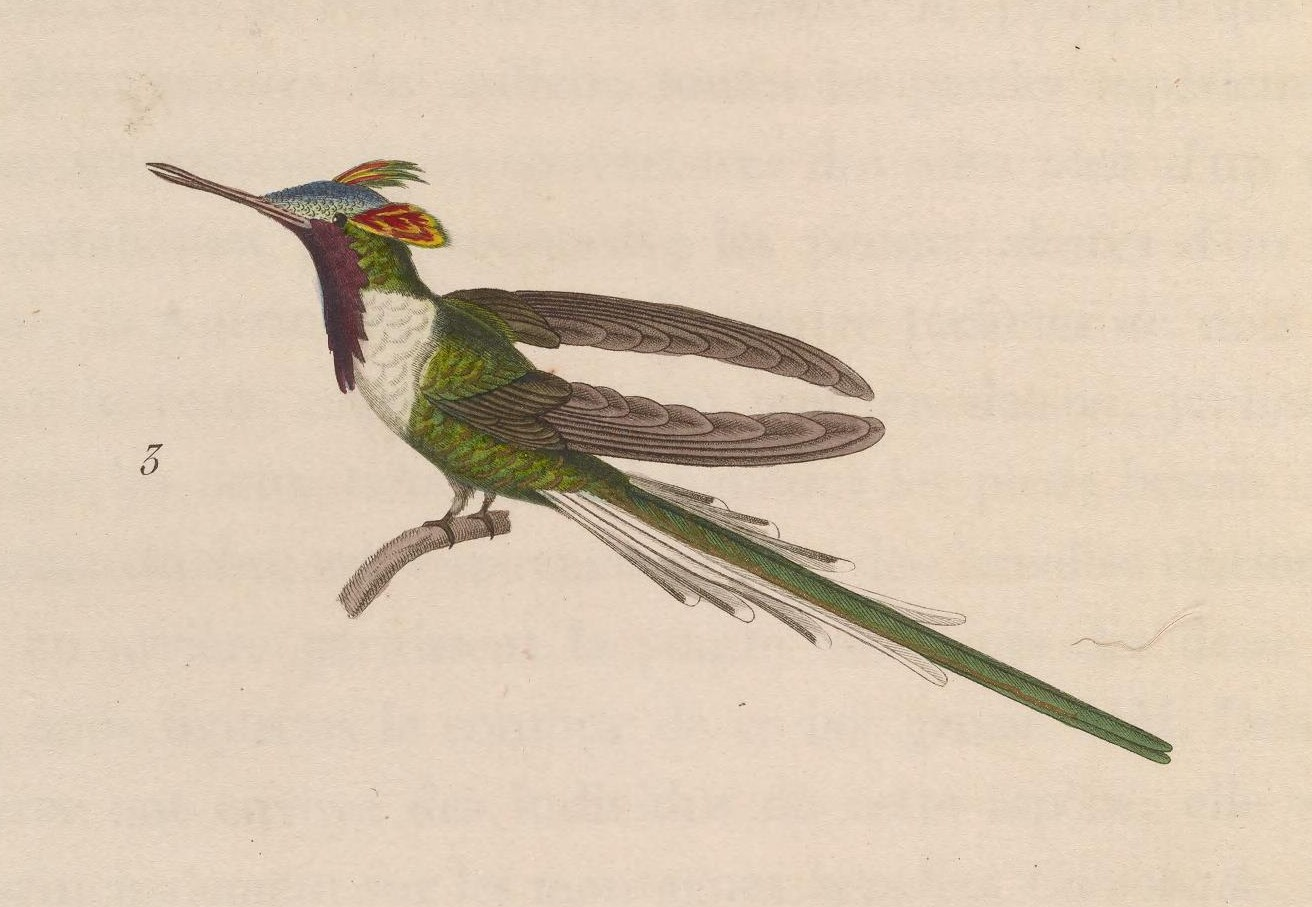
Drawing of the holotype specimen of the horned sungem as figured in the 1820 description of the species

The following cladogram based on genetic data shows the relationships of the horned sungem within the subfamily Polytminae:

- Polytminae
  - Colibri-Group
  - - - Heliothryx-Group
        - Horned sungem (Heliactin bilophus)
        - - Tooth-billed hummingbird (Androdon aequatorialis)
          - - Black-eared fairy (Heliothryx auritus)
            - Purple-crowned fairy (Heliothryx barroti)
      - Anthracothorax-Group

== Description ==
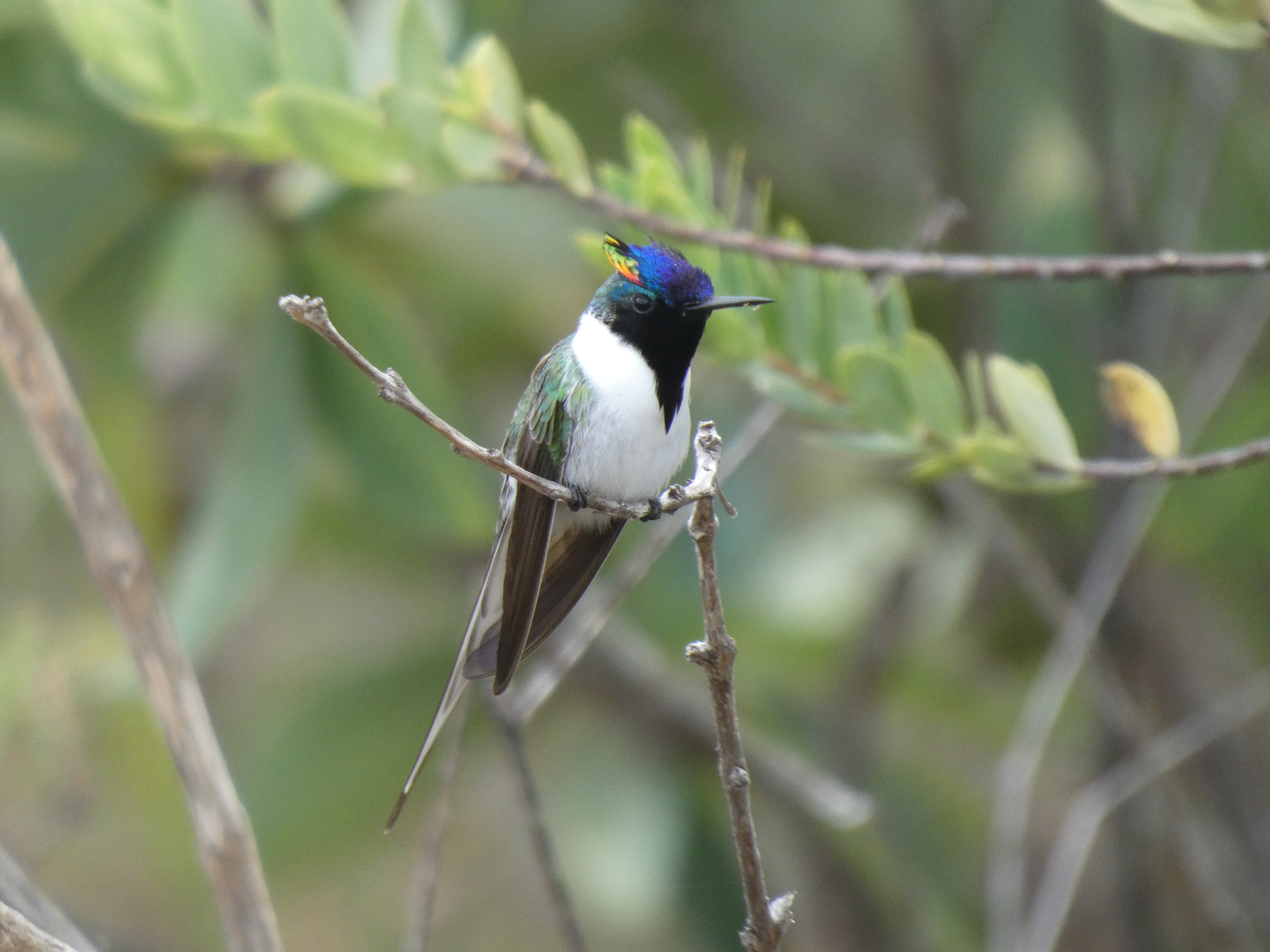
Male near Serra do Cipó National Park

The horned sungem is a small hummingbird with a long tail, measuring 9.5 to 11 cm (3.7 to 4.3 in) in length and weighing 1.8 to 2.8 g (0.06 to 0.10 oz). Both the male and female are light-colored with a metallic yellow-green upperside and a white underside. The sides of the neck are also white, giving the impression of a half-collar. The flight feathers are black-brown, and the bill and feet are black. The bill is slender, straight, and comparatively short, measuring 1.6 cm (0.63 in) in length. The tail feathers are pointed, and the middle four tail feathers are much longer than the outer ones. The middle two tail feathers are buff in the male and green in the female, and the remaining tail feathers are mostly white. The upper part of the tail, when viewed from below, shows a black band that forms a V-shape.

The species shows pronounced differences between male and female. The male is recognized as particularly beautiful and spectacular, with iridescent feather tufts ("horns") above the eyes. Each of these tufts consists of a row of six feathers that are inclined backwards and are fiery red at their base, golden in the middle, and golden-green at their tips. The other feathers of the upper surface of the head are shiny dark blue to blue green and form a low crest at the back. The throat and side of the head up to the ear region are covered with non-iridescent black feathers; those of the middle of the throat are very long, forming a pointed "beard" that extends above the white feathers of the breast. The female is plainer, without the "horns", the black feathers, and the iridescent head feathers. Its chin and throat are brown or yellow-buff, with darker tones on the sides of the head. Its tail is shorter than that of the male. Juveniles resemble females.

The horned sungem is unlikely to be mistaken for any other species in its range. The female, even though it lacks the unique adornments of the male, can be identified by its yellow-green upperside, its white underside, and its long tail. The female is somewhat similar to the female black-eared fairy, but is distinguished from the latter by its more yellowish upperside, its more extensive white neck collar, and the shape and coloration of its tail.

=== Vocalizations ===
In flight, the horned sungem gives an intricate series of high-pitched sounds. Other calls have been described as "tsit", "tseet", or "chup", and are given repeatedly.

== Distribution and habitat ==
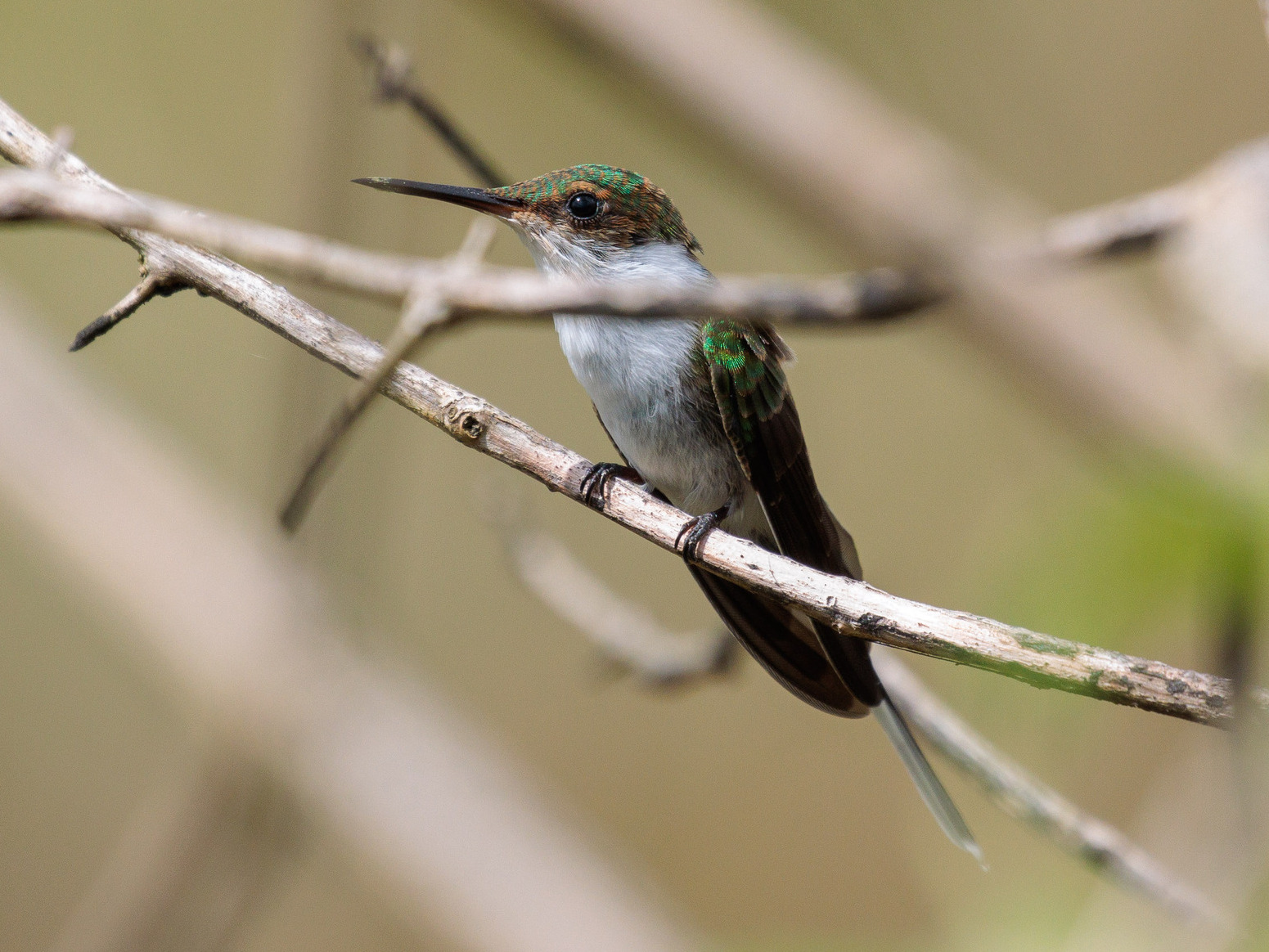
Female in Paraíba

The horned sungem is found across much of central Brazil, in the east from southern Maranhão south to the north of the State of São Paulo and then west to western Mato Grosso and into Bolivia's Santa Cruz department. It has recently expanded its range into southern Amazonas and Espírito Santo, probably as a result of deforestation and its ability to adopt open landscapes created by humans. It is also found in a small area of southern Suriname and in another small area in the northern Brazilian state of Amapá, and has been reported outside of its normal range in Acre in far western Brazil. A possible presence in the state of Rio de Janeiro has still to be confirmed. Its total range is estimated to encompass 6,490,000 km^{2} (2,510,000 sq mi). The International Union for Conservation of Nature (IUCN) considers the species to be uncommon, though some other sources have described it as "locally common" or "common".

It inhabits a variety of semi-open to open habitats including dry and moist forests, savannas including the Cerrado and Caatinga, grasslands, and cultivated areas such as gardens. Though it is mostly found below 500 m (1,600 ft) of elevation, it occurs as high as 1,000 m (3,300 ft).

== Ecology and behavior ==
=== Migration ===
The horned sungem is a highly nomadic species. The populations in central-east Brazil are migratory, where the birds move in response to the seasonal flowering of plants. Elsewhere it appears to be more resident, though its movement patterns in southern Brazil are not well known.

=== Feeding ===
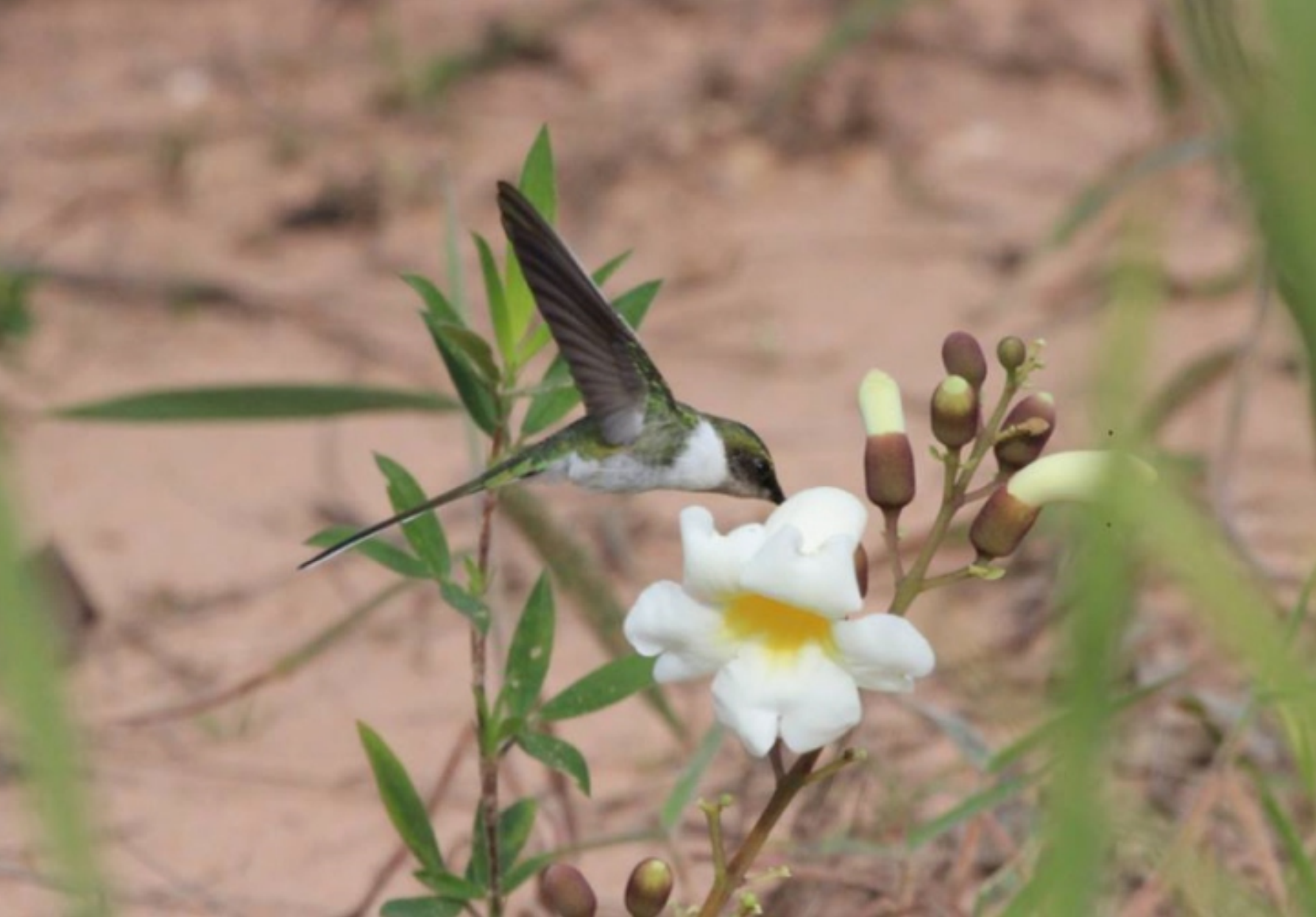
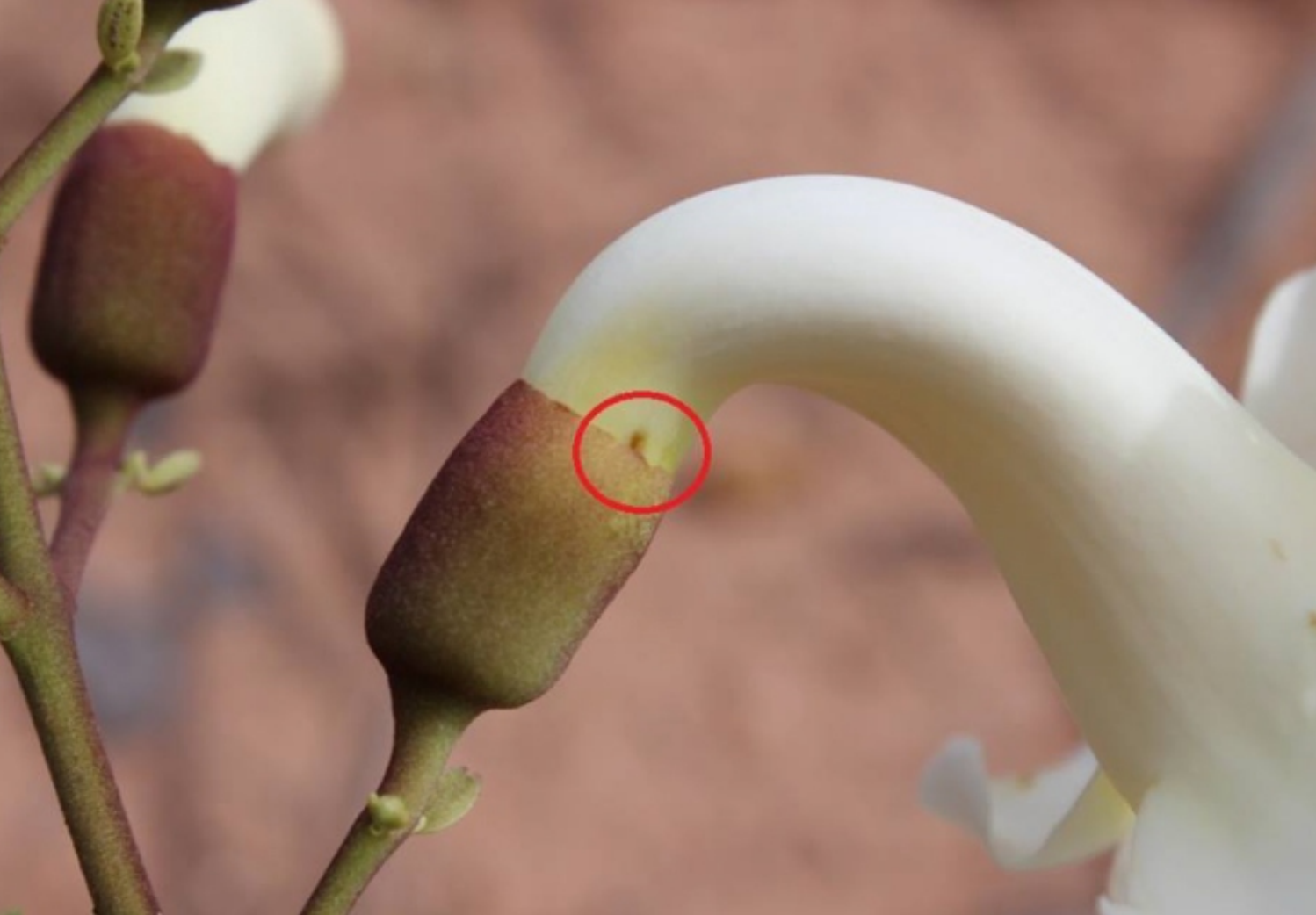
Female nectar robbing the plant Amphilophium elongatum (top); hole used to obtain the nectar (bottom, red circle)

All hummingbirds are mostly nectarivorous (feeding on the nectar of blossoms), and are important pollinators as they transport pollen from blossom to blossom. The horned sungem feeds on nectar from a variety of flowering plants, such as Palicourea rigida, Bauhinia tenella, Cuphea linarioides, Zeyheria montana, and Calliandra sincorana. It usually feeds alone and prefers blossoms that are close to the ground. A 2014 study reported that in the studied Cerrado area in Bahia, the horned sungem visited more plant species than any of the other resident hummingbird species (9 out of 11 plant species for which hummingbird visits were recorded). These plants include three species (Dyckia dissitiflora, Sida angustissima, and Lippia cf. gracilis) that were not visited by any of the other hummingbird species. The sungem also catches small insects in flight, and possibly from vegetation.

When the shape of a flower is incompatible with their bills, some hummingbirds may become nectar robbers by piercing the base of the flower's corolla to access the nectar, without contributing to pollination. Hummingbirds of the Colibri and Heliothryx groups, to which the horned sungem belongs, have bill tips that are flattened laterally (sideways) to a stronger degree than in any other hummingbird species. This bill shape, which has also been termed a "stiletto-shape", is probably an adaptation for piercing flowers for nectar robbing. The "stiletto-shape" is pronounced in the horned sungem, although to a lesser degree than in some related hummingbirds such as Geoffroy's daggerbill, which is named after this feature. A 2016 study confirmed nectar robbing in the horned sungem; the observed individuals robbed nectar from the plants Amphilophium elongatum and a species of Sinningia. However, it could not be observed whether the openings used to obtain the nectar were created by the sungem, by another hummingbird, or even by an insect. Nectar robbing may be an important survival strategy for the horned sungem in times of food shortages.

=== Breeding ===
Male filmed near Serra do Cipó National Park

The sungem's breeding season is mostly from June to October but in some cases starts as early as April. The female alone builds the nest, incubates the eggs, and cares for the young. It makes a small cup nest of soft material and spider web, adorned with lichen on the outside. One nest was measured at 2.9 cm (1.1 in) in diameter and 1.95 cm (0.77 in) in height. It is built in a branch fork, usually at a height of approximately 1 m (3.3 ft). The female lays two white and elliptical eggs which are 11 by 8 mm (0.43 by 0.31 in) in size and 0.29 g (0.010 oz) in weight. In one case, the second egg was laid within two hours of the first. The eggs are incubated for about 13 days. The chicks are naked and black just after hatching, and fledge 20 to 22 days later. A 2012 study monitored one nest and found that it was re-used for a second breeding attempt later in the same breeding season. The birds become sexually mature in their second year, and the average generation length has been estimated at 4.2 years.

=== Agonistic behavior ===
A 2014 study monitored fights over territory between the hummingbirds of a Cerrado habitat. Of the three resident hummingbird species in the studied area, the horned sungem was found to be the most aggressive, with 12 fights between horned sungem individuals and 7 attacks on a subordinate species, the glittering-bellied emerald. The horned sungem is subordinate to the larger swallow-tailed hummingbird in areas where this species occurs.

=== Parasites ===
The feather mite Allodectes norneri is a known parasite of the horned sungem. This mite has also been recorded in the long-tailed sylph.

== Status ==
The IUCN has assessed the horned sungem as being of least concern. This species was in high demand in the international bird trade, but from the end of the 1970s this trade has been restricted. As with all hummingbird species, the horned sungem is listed in Appendix II of CITES (Convention on International Trade in Endangered Species of Wild Fauna and Flora). The sungem occurs in several protected areas, such as Serra do Cipó National Park and Brasília National Park in Brazil and Noel Kempff Mercado National Park in Bolivia. The species has recently expanded into Espírito Santo and southern Amazonas, being one of few hummingbirds that have recently increased their range. Though its population size is not known, it is believed to be increasing.

A 2019 study estimated the vulnerability of 103 bird species native to the Brazilian Cerrado to changes in climate and land use projected for 2050, and found that the horned sungem is adaptable and comparatively insensitive to these threats. One of the criteria used was the dispersal ability (the bird's ability to move to new areas), which was estimated based on wing measurements. Together with another hummingbird, the frilled coquette, the horned sungem had the highest estimated dispersal ability of the studied species.
