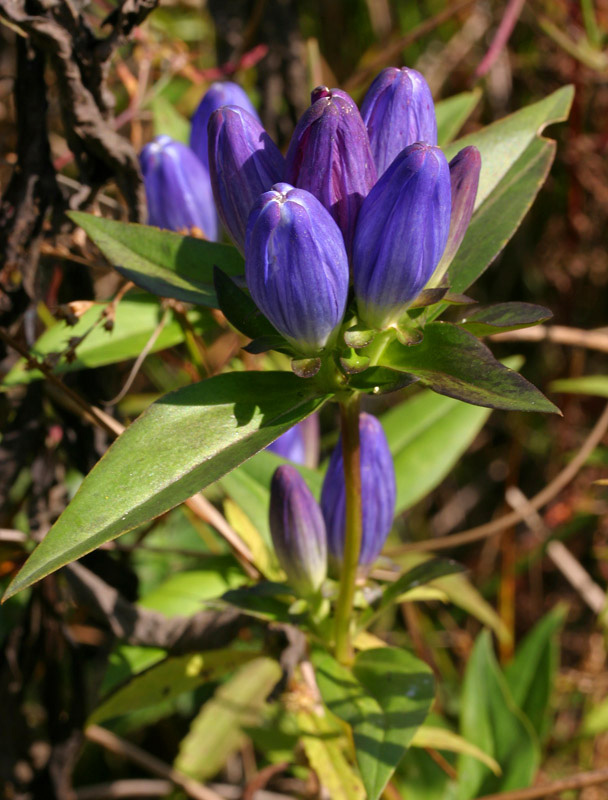
- Closed bottle gentian (Gentiana andrewsii)

Conservation status
- Least Concern (IUCN 3.1)

- Secure (NatureServe)

Scientific classification
- Kingdom: Plantae
- Clade: Tracheophytes
- Clade: Angiosperms
- Clade: Eudicots
- Clade: Asterids
- Order: Gentianales
- Family: Gentianaceae
- Genus: Gentiana
- Species: G. andrewsii

Binomial name
- Gentiana andrewsii Griseb.

Varieties
- Gentiana andrewsii var. andrewsii; Gentiana andrewsii var. dakotica A.Nelson

Synonyms
- List: Dasystephana andrewsii (Griseb.) Small (1903); Pneumonanthe andrewsii (Griseb.) W.A.Weber (1976)

= Gentiana andrewsii =

Bottle gentian

Plant species in the gentian family

Gentiana andrewsii, the bottle gentian, closed gentian, or closed bottle gentian, is an herbaceous species of flowering plant in the gentian family Gentianaceae. Gentiana andrewsii is native to northeastern North America, from the Dakotas to the East Coast and through eastern Canada.

It shares the common name "bottle gentian" with several other species.

== Description ==
Gentiana andrewsii is a perennial herb that blooms in late summer (August to October). The flowers are 2 to 4 cm (3/4 to 1 1/2 in) long, typically a rich blue color and bottle shaped with fused petals (sympetalous) and closed mouths. The flowers are clustered at the top of the plant or in the axis of the top leaves. The stems are 30 to 60 cm (12 to 24 in) long, lax in habit, producing sprawling plants with upturned ends ending with clusters of bee pollinated flowers. The foliage is hairless with a glossy sheen to it.

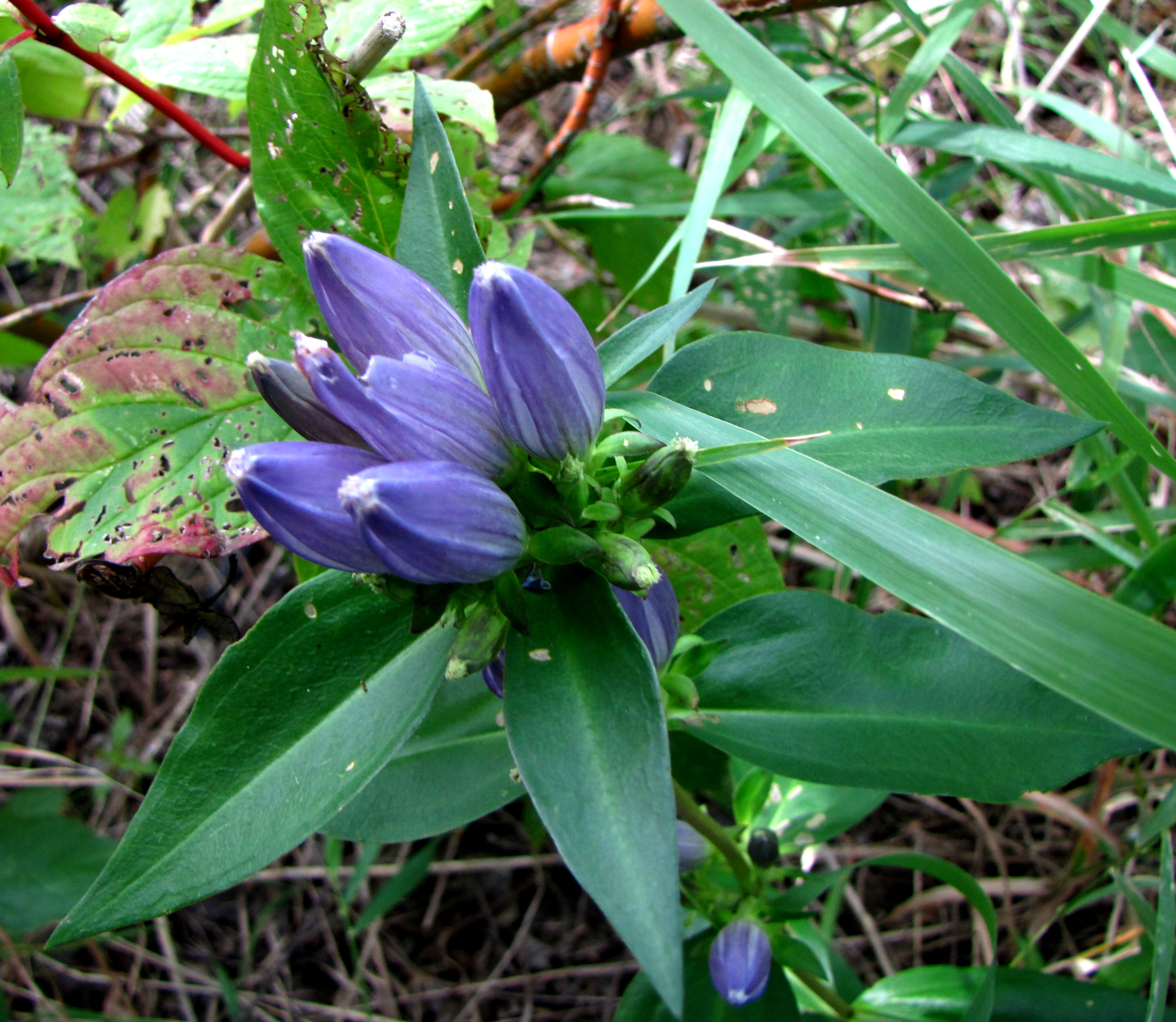
Blooming in Ottawa, Ontario, Canada

== Taxonomy ==
The plant was named in honor of Henry C. Andrews, an English botanical artist and engraver.

Named infraspecies and hybrids include:

- Gentiana andrewsii var. andrewsii
- Gentiana andrewsii var. dakotica
- Gentiana andrewsii fo. albiflora
- Gentiana × billingtonii (Gentiana andrewsii × puberulenta)
- Gentiana × pallidocyanea (Gentiana alba x andrewsii)

== Ecology ==
Closed bottle gentian occurs in wet to dry-mesic prairies and prairie fens, primarily in loamy soils, but it can also be found in sandy areas, such as near Great Lakes shorelines.

The closed flowers make entrance to feed on pollen or nectar difficult for many species of insects, just like for Gentiana clausa. Those strong enough to enter through the top of the flower include the digger bee species Anthophora terminalis and the bumblebee species Bombus fervidus, Bombus griseocollis, and Bombus impatiens. The eastern carpenter bee (Xylocopa virginica) chews a narrow slit at the base of the flower and "steals" nectar without pollinating the plant, a behavior known as nectar robbing. The holes in the petals created by this species allow smaller insects to also access the nectar and pollen, including the honeybee (Apis mellifera), the green sweat bee species Augochlorella aurata and Augochlorella persimilis, and the eastern masked bee (Hylaeus affinis).

This gentian is considered a threatened species in the US states of New York and Maryland and a Species of Greatest Conservation Need and Endangered in Massachusetts.
