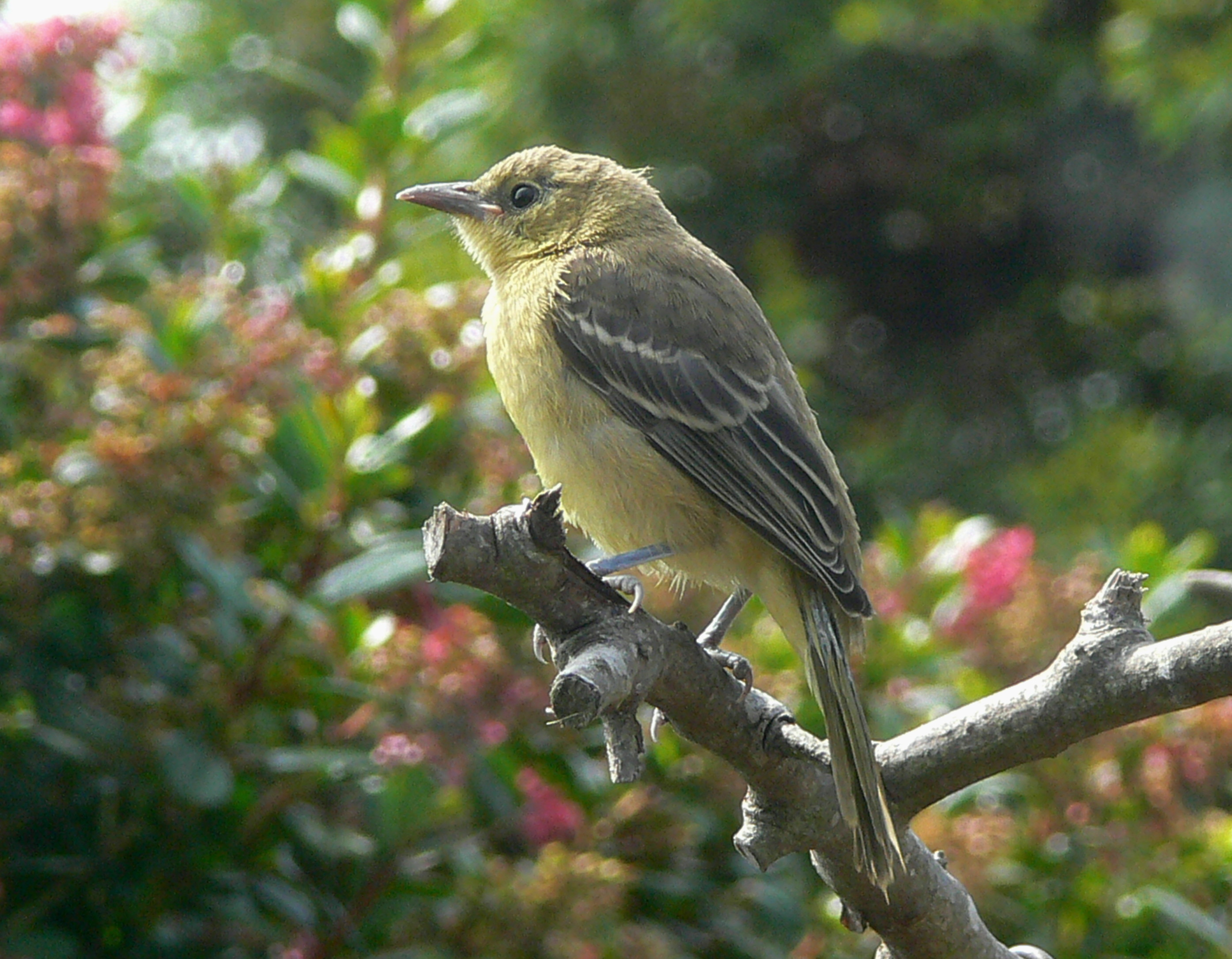
- Female
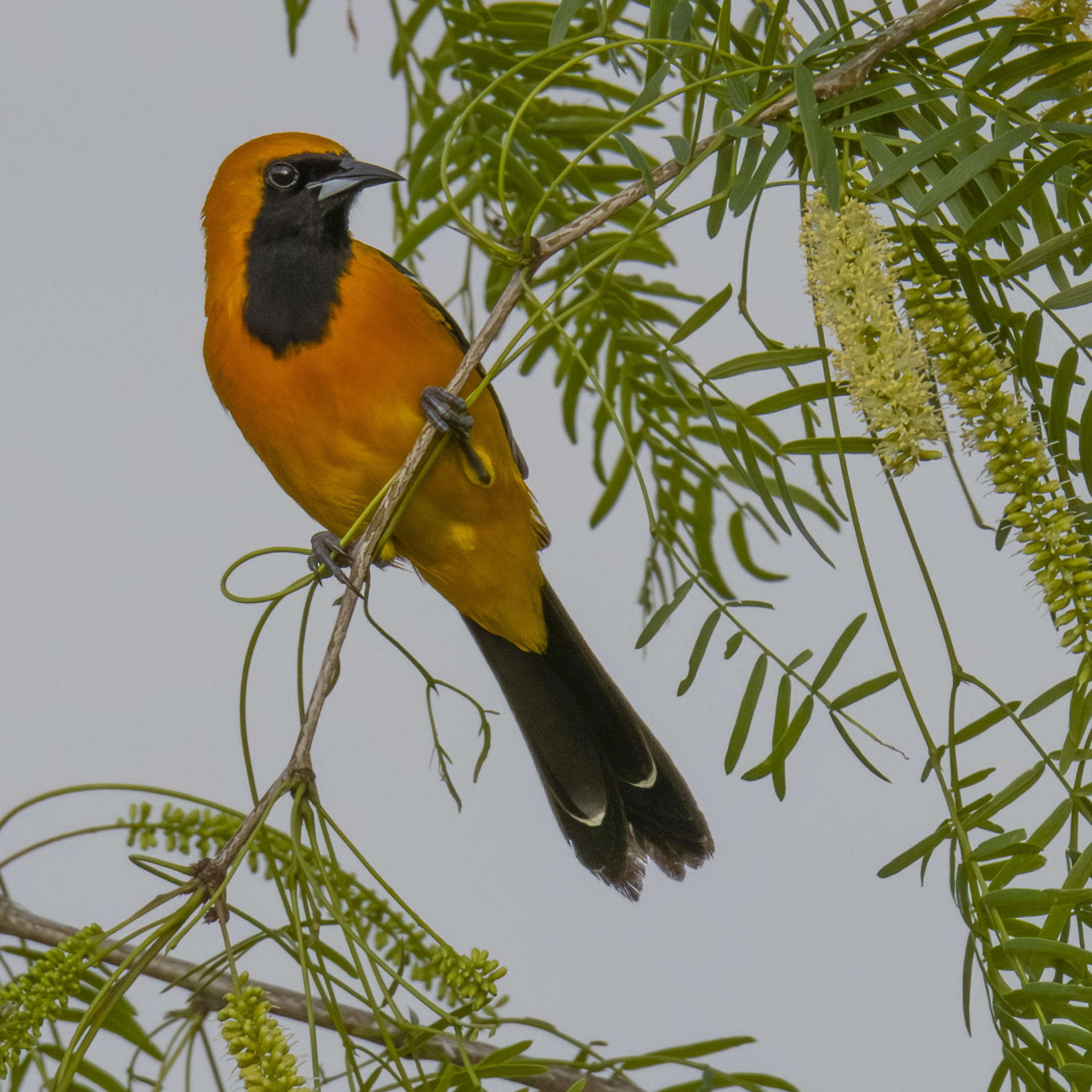
- Male

Conservation status
- Least Concern (IUCN 3.1)

Scientific classification
- Kingdom: Animalia
- Phylum: Chordata
- Class: Aves
- Order: Passeriformes
- Family: Icteridae
- Genus: Icterus
- Species: I. cucullatus

Binomial name
- Icterus cucullatus Swainson, 1827
- Breeding range Year-round range Wintering range

= Hooded oriole =

Species of bird

The hooded oriole (Icterus cucullatus) is a medium-sized New World oriole. The male of this species ranges in color from a bright orange to a paler yellow, with a black back, face, tail and bib, with the wing containing two white bars. The female is more of an olive color with some yellow accents.

== Description and ecology ==
Adults have a curved bill which is completely black and white wing bars. The adult male has a deep yellowish orange head with black on the face and throat; they are black on the back, wings and tail, orange on the underparts. The adult female is olive-green on the upper parts, yellowish on the breast and belly. Their calls consist of whistling and wheets, while their song is a mixture of both.

Their breeding habitat is open areas with trees, especially palms, across the Southwestern United States and northern Mexico. The nest is a tightly woven pouch attached to the underside of a leaf or tree branch. Sometimes their nest is filled with the egg of a brown-headed cowbird which is a parasite bird that lays its eggs in other birds nests for that species to take care of.

These birds migrate in flocks south to Mexico's southwestern coast; they are permanent residents in Baja California Sur, the Mexican east coast, and Belize. Some may over-winter near feeders. They can also be found in Southern California neighborhoods, but are rare in the winter.

They forage in trees and shrubs, also feeding from flowers. It is a nectar robber because it pierces the base of the flower, and does not assist in pollination. These birds mainly eat insects, nectar and fruit, and will also visit hummingbird feeders and bird feeders for seeds.

== Behavior ==
Diet

The hooded oriole's diet consists of insects, berries, and nectar. Hooded Orioles are acrobatic feeders, often hanging upside down to get the nectar from flowers and to catch their prey. This species feeds on a variety of insects, but may especially favor caterpillars, beetles, wasps, and ants. Hooded orioles forage for food slowly, gathering insects from foliage in the trees and feeding on berries, along with sometimes oranges or other citrus. They also probe flowers for nectar, and may take insects there as well. They are common visitors to insect and hummingbird feeders.

Voice

The song of the hooded oriole tends to be short and abrupt. The notes are rapid and lack the whistling nature of many other oriole species, and often sound nasal and whiny in nature.

There is a high amount of variation both geographically and individually within the song of the hooded oriole. Each male also sings many different types of songs. The hooded oriole has been known to include mimicry in its song, notably in Arizona some individuals have included the songs of the Gila Woodpecker and the Ash-throated Flycatcher.

Common calls of the hooded oriole include a whistled wheet or sweet sound. A chatter call is given as an alarm, somewhat similar to that of the Baltimore oriole or Bullock's oriole. The individual notes of the hooded oriole's chatter are given more quickly however, and it creates a shriller sound. Juveniles commonly give a soft chut and a harsher chuck or chet, however these have also been observed being given by adults.

Nesting

Males arrive at their nesting sites in the last weeks of March and set up breeding territories. The breeding season lasts from April to July in Texas, May to August in Arizona, April to mid-August in California, and May to August in Baja California.

Recent reports state that the nests are constructed and secured on the undersides of palms and banana plants. Location and structure materials vary geographically. Arizona nests are often made of grasses and located in taller trees. Meanwhile, California nests are made from palm fibers and located on the underside of palm plants. The hooded oriole's nest is basket shaped, and much deeper than its relatives.

Female hooded orioles lay a clutch of 3–5 eggs. The eggs are generally white, but can range into a pale blue with darker splotches. The eggs are incubated for 12–14 days, and the nestlings take about 14 days to fledge. This species is also commonly parasitized by the brown-headed cowbird and the bronzed cowbird.

== Geographic variation ==
There are five subspecies divided into two groups: those east of the Big Bend in Texas, which are more orange in color, and those found in New Mexico and more south, which are yellower in color.

I. c. cucullatus

This subspecies is found in the Rio Grande Valley in Texas and south through Mexico to Oaxaca and Veracruz. This subspecies is very orange in color.

I. c. sennetti

This subspecies occurs from the lower Rio Grande valley of Texas south along the coastal plain into Tamaulipas. This subspecies is similar in color to cucullatus but is notably paler and more yellow.

I. c. igneus

This subspecies occurs in southern Mexico from East Tabasco and the Yucatán Peninsula south into Belize. This is the brightest most orange form. It has been reported that females of this subspecies may display a more greyish throat patch.

I. c. nelsoni

This is the western form of this species, found from California south to North Baja California, and east into Arizona and New Mexico. This subspecies is noticeably more yellow than the others. This subspecies also has a much more slender bill, and longer wings and shorter tail.

I. c. trochiloides

This subspecies is found in Baja California and Mexico. This is a yellowish-orange combo, and has a much longer and thinner bill.

== Gallery ==
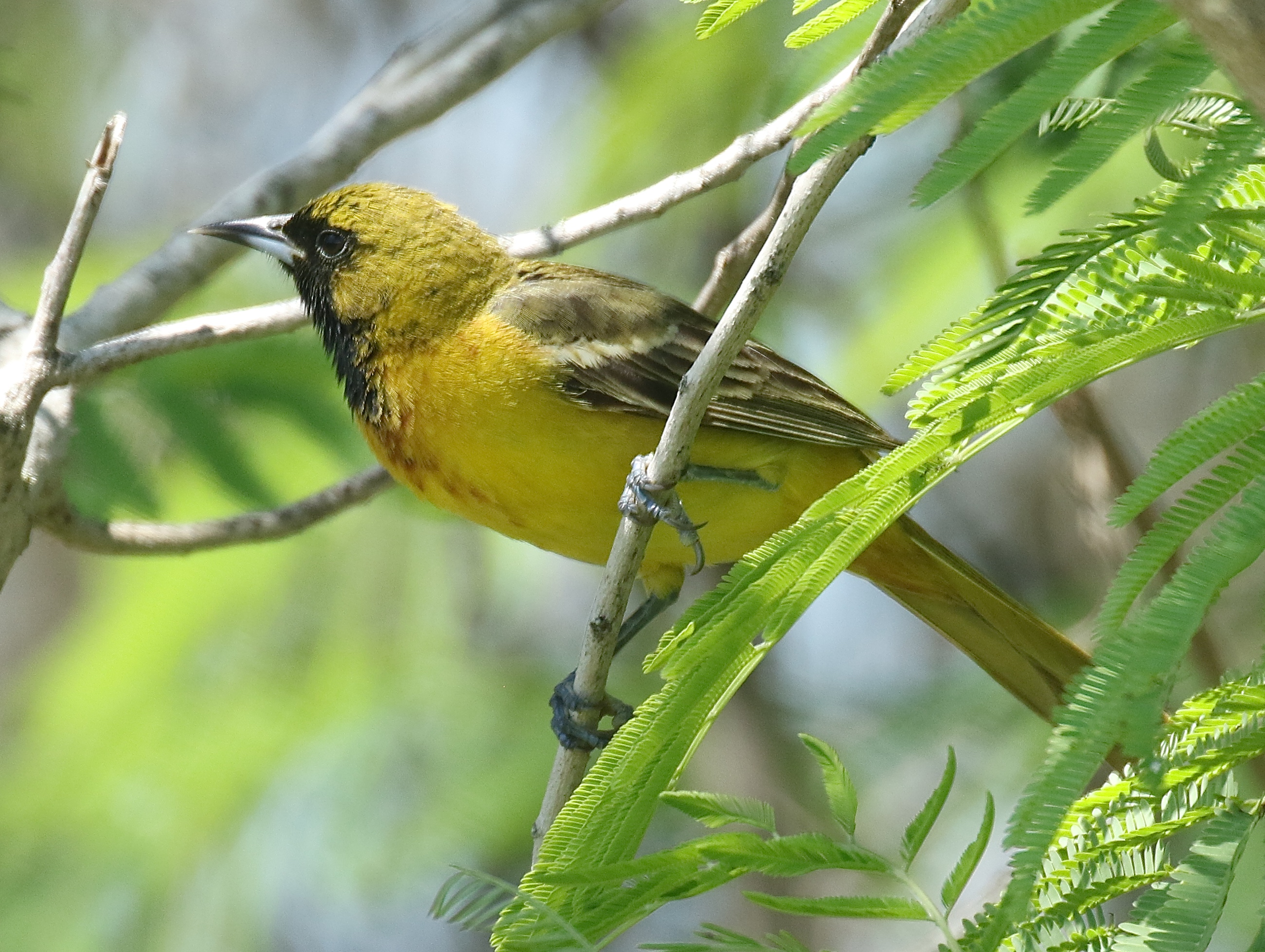
1st summer - South Padre Island, Texas

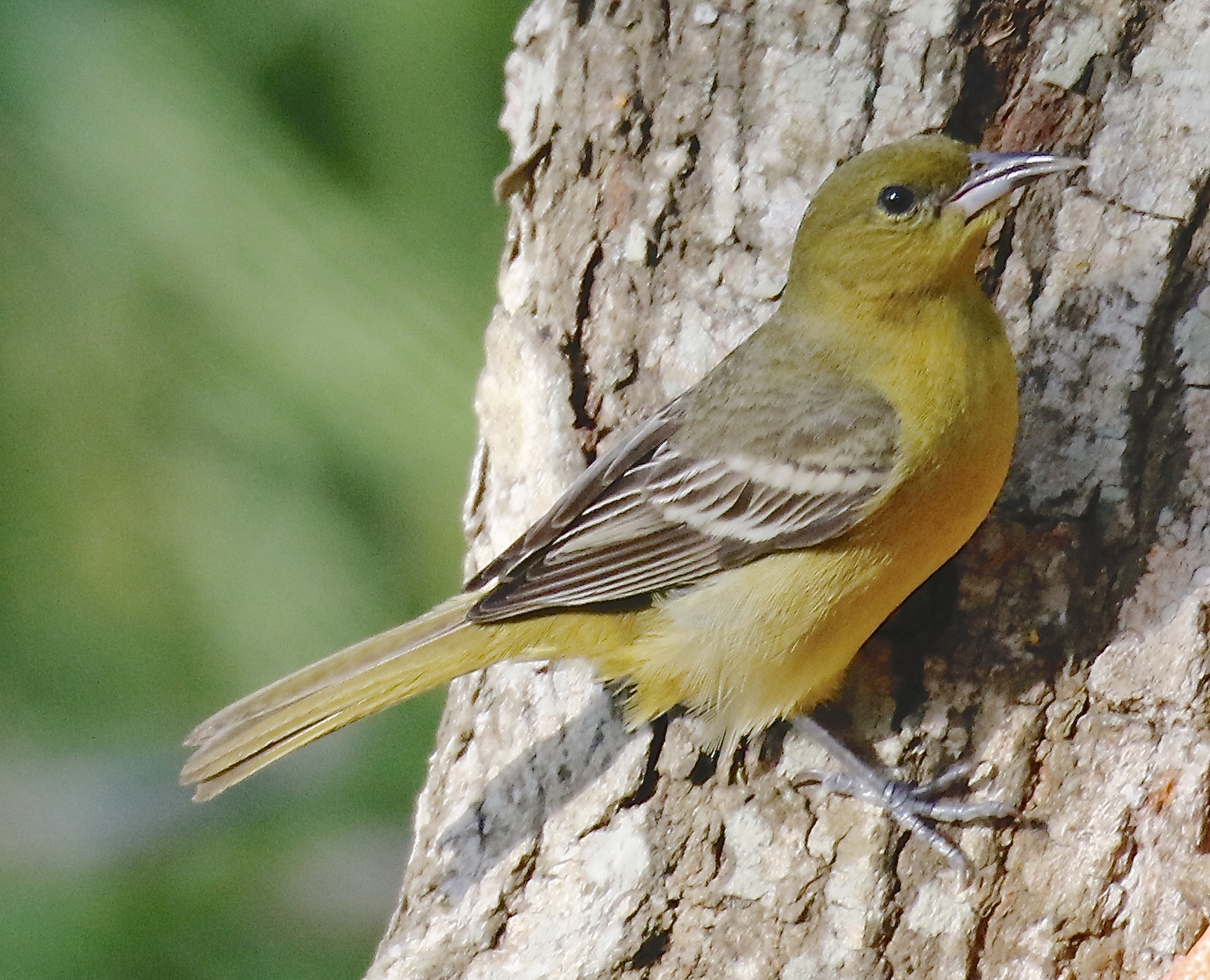
Female - South Padre Island, Texas

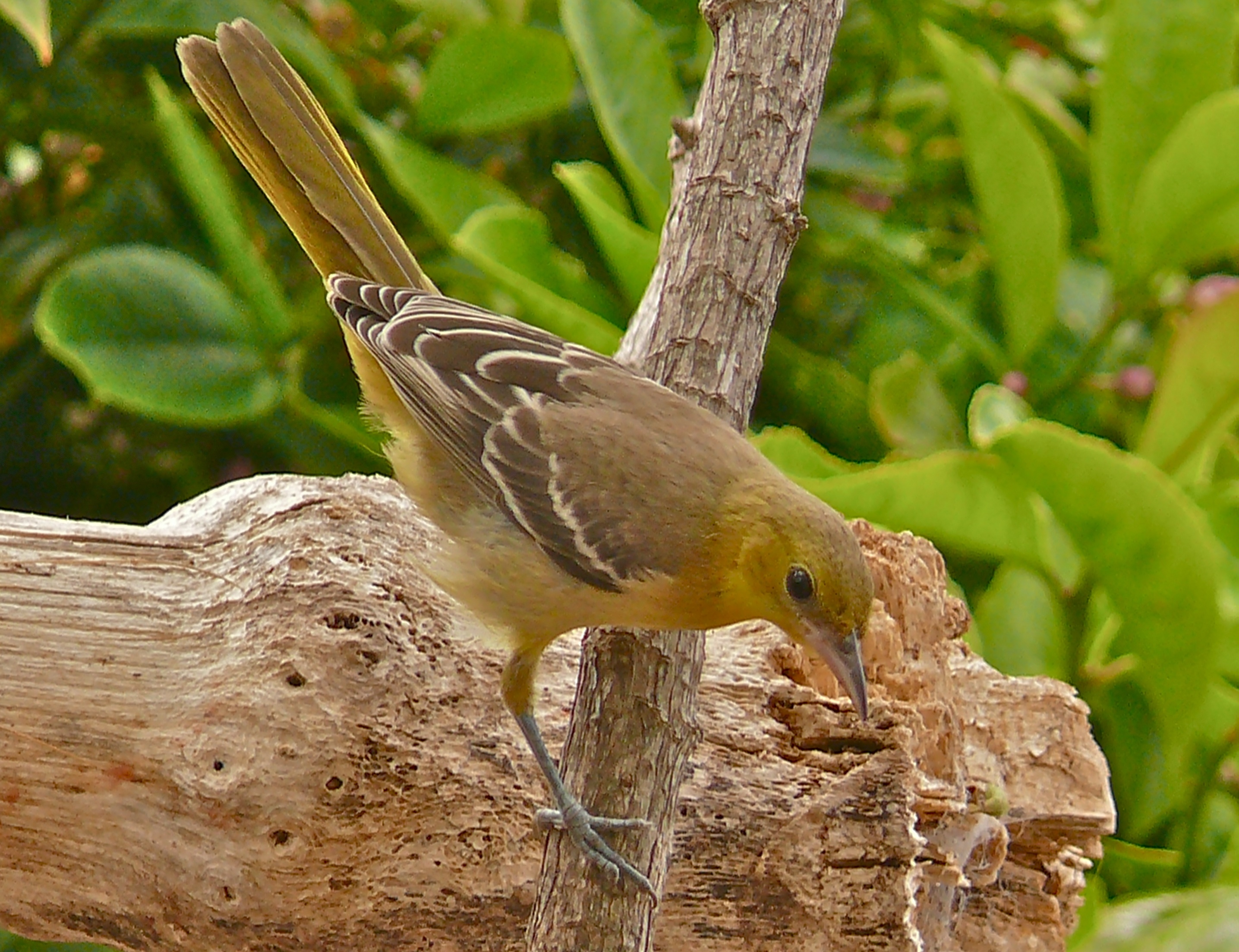
Juvenile in California, United States
