= G. alba =

G. alba may refer to:

- Gentiana alba, the pale gentian, white gentian or cream gentian, a herbaceous flowering plant species
- Geocrinia alba, the white-bellied frog, a small frog species found in Southwest Australia
- Gygis alba, the white tern, a small seabird species found across the tropical oceans of the world

== See also ==
- Alba (disambiguation)
