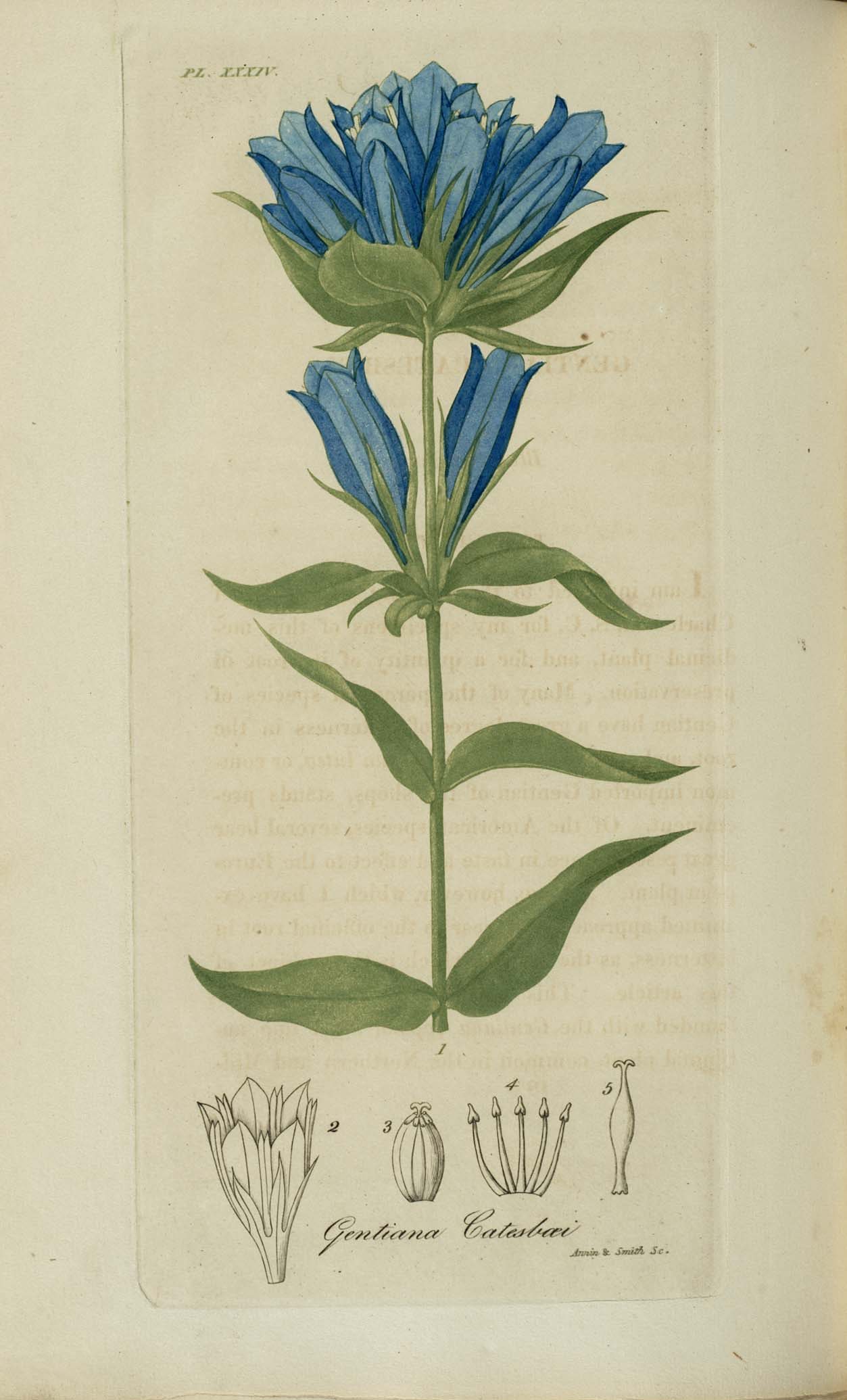
- Illustration circa 1820

Scientific classification
- Kingdom: Plantae
- Clade: Tracheophytes
- Clade: Angiosperms
- Clade: Eudicots
- Clade: Asterids
- Order: Gentianales
- Family: Gentianaceae
- Genus: Gentiana
- Species: G. catesbaei

Binomial name
- Gentiana catesbaei Walt.

= Gentiana catesbaei =

Species of plant

Gentiana catesbaei, commonly called Elliot's gentian, American gentian, or bottle gentian, is a wildflower native to the eastern North America. It grows in the swampy areas from Virginia to Florida and has showy, pale blue flowers which appear in the late fall from September to December.

It shares the common name "bottle gentian" with several other species.

== Uses ==
The Catawba American Indians were known to use the Elliott's gentian for medicinal purposes. They would steep the roots in hot water and then use the produced liquid to soothe sore backs. This is not surprising as the European gentian, G. lutea, has been used as a digestive tonic and was listed in the United States Pharmacopeia from 1820 to 1995 as a gastric stimulant. In fact, the very name of the genus is derived from Gentius, a king of Illyria who recognized the tonic properties of the plant.
