= Bottle gentian =

Bottle gentian is a common name for several plants and may refer to:

- Gentiana andrewsii, native to northeastern North America
- Gentiana catesbaei
- Gentiana clausa, native to southeastern North America
