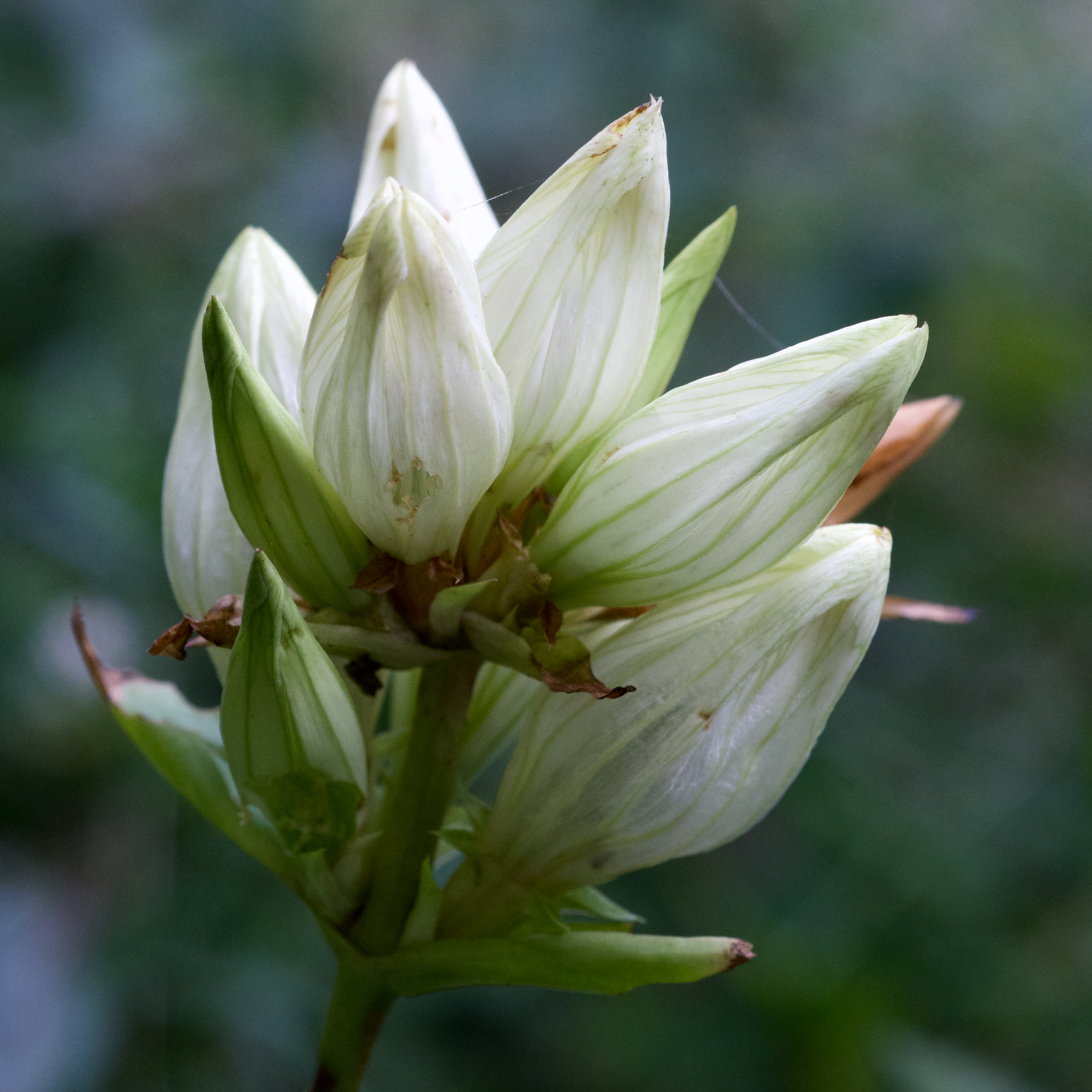

Conservation status
- Apparently Secure (NatureServe)

Scientific classification
- Kingdom: Plantae
- Clade: Tracheophytes
- Clade: Angiosperms
- Clade: Eudicots
- Clade: Asterids
- Order: Gentianales
- Family: Gentianaceae
- Genus: Gentiana
- Species: G. alba

Binomial name
- Gentiana alba Muhl. ex Nutt.

= Gentiana alba =

Pale gentian

Species of plant

Gentiana alba (called plain, pale, white, cream, or yellow gentian) is a herbaceous species of flowering plant in the Gentian family Gentianaceae, producing yellowish-white colored flowers from thick white taproots. It is native to North America from Manitoba through Ontario in the north, south to Oklahoma, Arkansas and North Carolina, and it is listed as rare, endangered, threatened or extirpated in parts of this range.

This species resembles bottle gentian (Gentiana andrewsii), which has blue flowers and a less upright habit, and shares much of the same range. Gentiana alba starts to bloom a few weeks earlier than bottle gentian and the flowers are more open at the tops. Gentiana alba can also hybridize with Gentiana andrewsii, producing upright growing plants having white flowers with blue edges.

Synonyms include Gentiana flavida A. Gray
