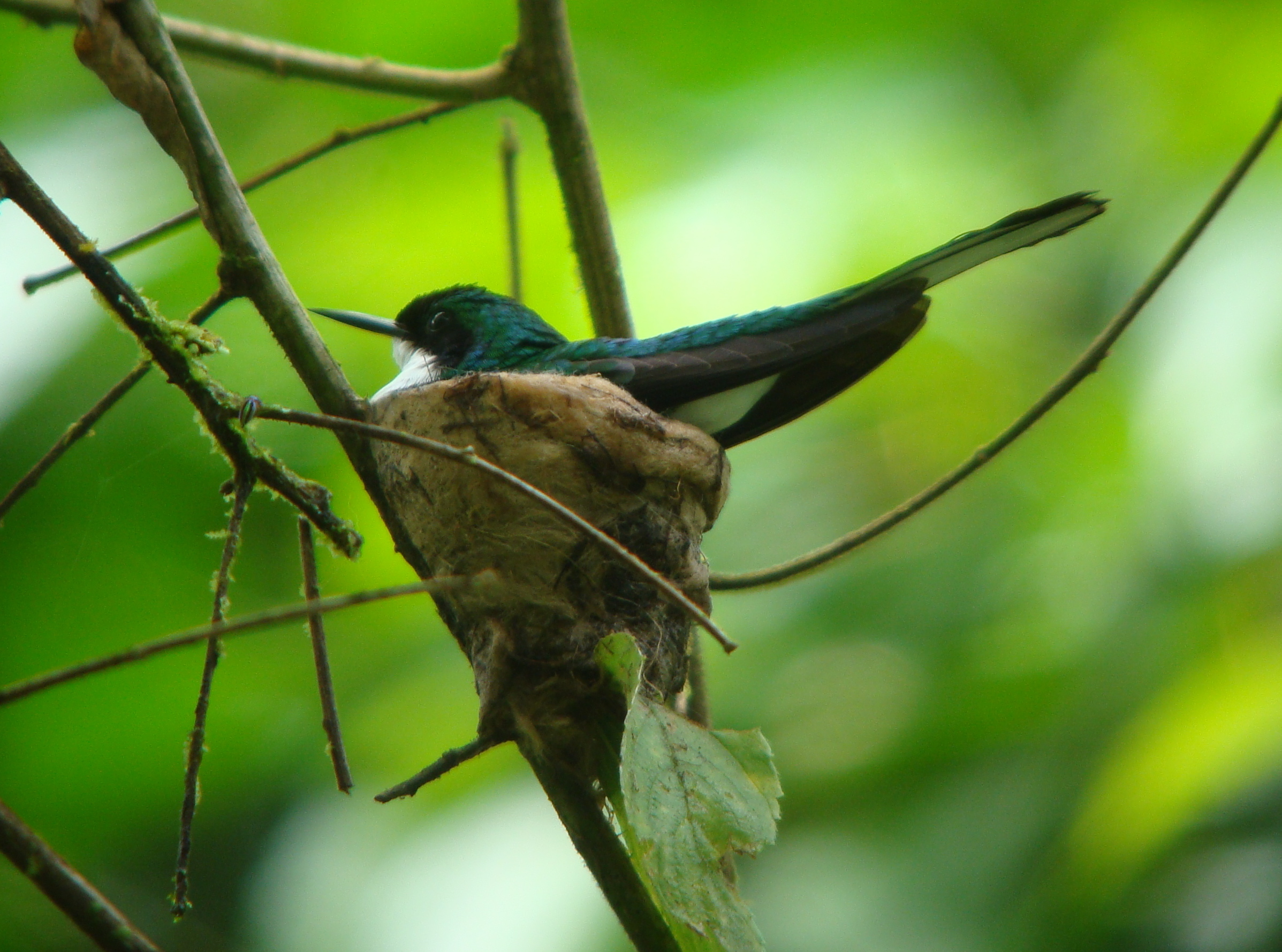
- Purple-crowned Fairy on nest at La Selva Biological Station, outside Puerto Viejo de Sarapiquí in Costa Rica

Conservation status
- Least Concern (IUCN 3.1)
- CITES Appendix II

Scientific classification
- Kingdom: Animalia
- Phylum: Chordata
- Class: Aves
- Order: Apodiformes
- Family: Trochilidae
- Genus: Heliothryx
- Species: H. barroti

Binomial name
- Heliothryx barroti (Bourcier, 1843)

= Purple-crowned fairy =

Species of hummingbird

The purple-crowned fairy (Heliothryx barroti) is a species of hummingbird in the subfamily Polytminae, the mangoes. It is found from southeastern Mexico south into northern Peru.

== Taxonomy and systematics ==
The purple-crowned fairy was originally described as Trochilus Barroti. It and the black-eared fairy (Heliothryx auritus) were treated as conspecific by some authors but are now considered to be a superspecies; they are the only members of the genus. Its scientific name commemorates Adolphe Barrot (1801–1870), a French diplomat who served in Colombia from 1831 to 1835.

The purple-crowned fairy is monotypic.

== Description ==
The purple-crowned fairy is 9 to 13 cm (3.5 to 5.1 in) long and weighs about 5.5 g (0.19 oz). It is slender and has bright emerald green upperparts, pure white underparts, and a long pointed tail which has blue-black central and white outer feathers. It has a black patch through the eye and the bill is short, straight, and black. The male has a metallic violet forecrown; the eye patch has a metallic violet spot behind it and bright emerald green below it. The female has a green crown and the face has less black, no violet spot, and no green below the black. Immatures have cinnamon fringes on their upperparts plumage and the throat and breast have sparse dusky spots.

== Distribution and habitat ==
The purple-crowned fairy is found from eastern Chiapas and southern Tabasco in Mexico through the Caribbean slopes of Belize, Guatemala, and Nicaragua; both slopes of Costa Rica; much of Panama; and the Pacific slopes of Colombia, Ecuador, and far northern Peru. In Colombia it also occurs east into the lower valley of the Magdalena River. In elevation it ranges from sea level to 500 m (1,600 ft) in Mexico and northern Central America, to 1,675 m (5,500 ft) in Costa Rica, to 1,000 m (3,300 ft) in Colombia, and to 800 m (2,600 ft) in Ecuador. It inhabits the canopy and edges of humid lowland forest, shady plantations, and mature secondary forest.

== Behavior ==
=== Movement ===
The purple-crowned fairy is resident throughout its range.

=== Feeding ===
The purple-crowned fairy mostly forages in the mid-story and canopy, though at forest edges it will forage lower. It takes nectar from a variety of flowering plants, both by inserting its bill into the corolla and by piercing the base of the flower to "rob" nectar. It also feeds on small arthropods (favoring spiders) by hovering and gleaning from foliage. It does not take insects on the wing like many other hummingbirds. Although it is not particularly territorial, this species is quite aggressive, and will resist the attacks of territorial hummingbird species.

=== Breeding ===
The purple-crowned fairy usually breeds between October and March in Costa Rica; its breeding seasons elsewhere have not been documented. The female alone builds the nest, incubates the eggs, and cares for the young. It makes a small conical cup nest of plant down without the attached lichens of many other hummingbird nests. It places the nest near the tip of a thin branch, usually between 6 and 20 m (20 and 66 ft) above the ground and often over water. The clutch size is two eggs. The incubation time is 16 to 17 days with fledging 20 to 24 days after hatch.

=== Vocalization ===
The purple-crowned fairly is not highly vocal. It does make a call that has been described as "a high, thin, slightly metallic sssit, which may be run into longer rapid series."

== Status ==
The IUCN has assessed the purple-crowned fairy as being of Least Concern. Its population is estimated to be at least 50,000 individuals but is believed to be decreasing. "Human activity probably has little short term effect on [the] Purple-crowned Fairy".
