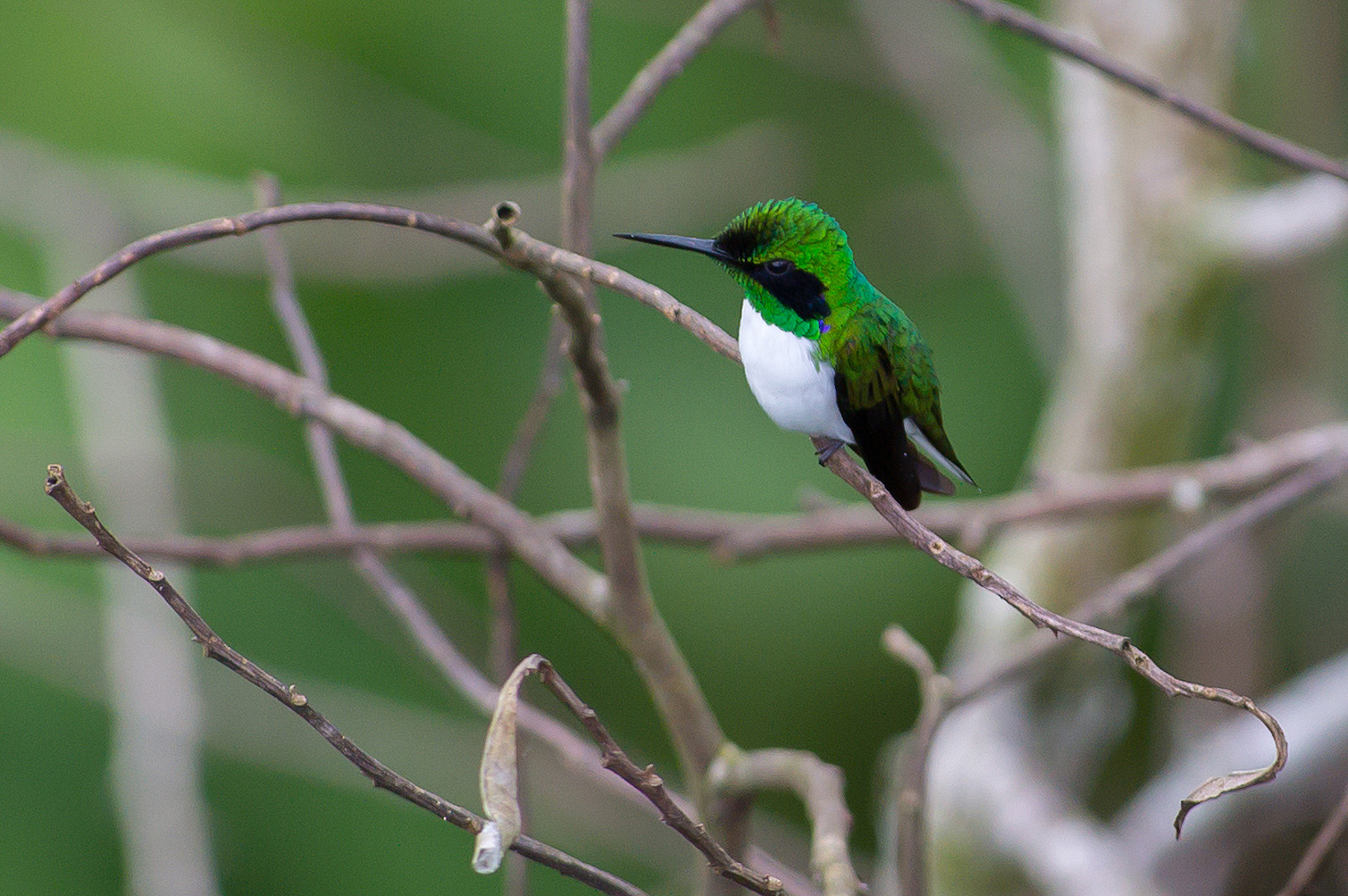

Conservation status
- Least Concern (IUCN 3.1)
- CITES Appendix II (CITES)

Scientific classification
- Kingdom: Animalia
- Phylum: Chordata
- Class: Aves
- Clade: Strisores
- Order: Apodiformes
- Family: Trochilidae
- Genus: Heliothryx
- Species: H. auritus

Binomial name
- Heliothryx auritus (Gmelin, JF, 1788)

= Black-eared fairy =

Species of hummingbird

The black-eared fairy (Heliothryx auritus) is a species of hummingbird in the subfamily Polytminae, the mangoes. It is found in every mainland South American country except Argentina, Chile, Paraguay, and Uruguay.

== Taxonomy ==
The black-eared fairy was formally described in 1788 by the German naturalist Johann Friedrich Gmelin in his revised and expanded edition of Carl Linnaeus's Systema Naturae. He placed it with all the other hummingbirds in the genus Trochilus and coined the binomial name Trochilus auritus. Gmelin based his description on "Le grand oiseau-mouche de Cayenne" that had been described by Mathurin Jacques Brisson in 1760 and "L'oiseau-mouche à oreilles" that had been described by the Comte de Buffon in 1779. The black-eared fairy is now placed with the purple-crowned fairy in the genus Heliothryx that was introduced in 1831 by the German zoologist Friedrich Boie. The genus name combines the Ancient Greek hēlios meaning "sun" with thrix meaning "hair". The specific epithet auritus is Latin meaning "-eared". The type locality is Cayenne, French Guiana.

Three subspecies are recognised:

- H. a. auritus (Gmelin, JF, 1788) – southeast Colombia and east Ecuador through Venezuela, the Guianas and north Brazil
- H. a. phainolaemus Gould, 1855 – north-central Brazil (south of the Amazon)
- H. a. auriculatus (Nordmann, 1835) – east Peru to central Bolivia and central, east Brazil

The black-eared fairy and the purple-crowned fairy (H. barroti) were treated as conspecific by some authors but are now considered to be a superspecies; they are the only members of the genus.

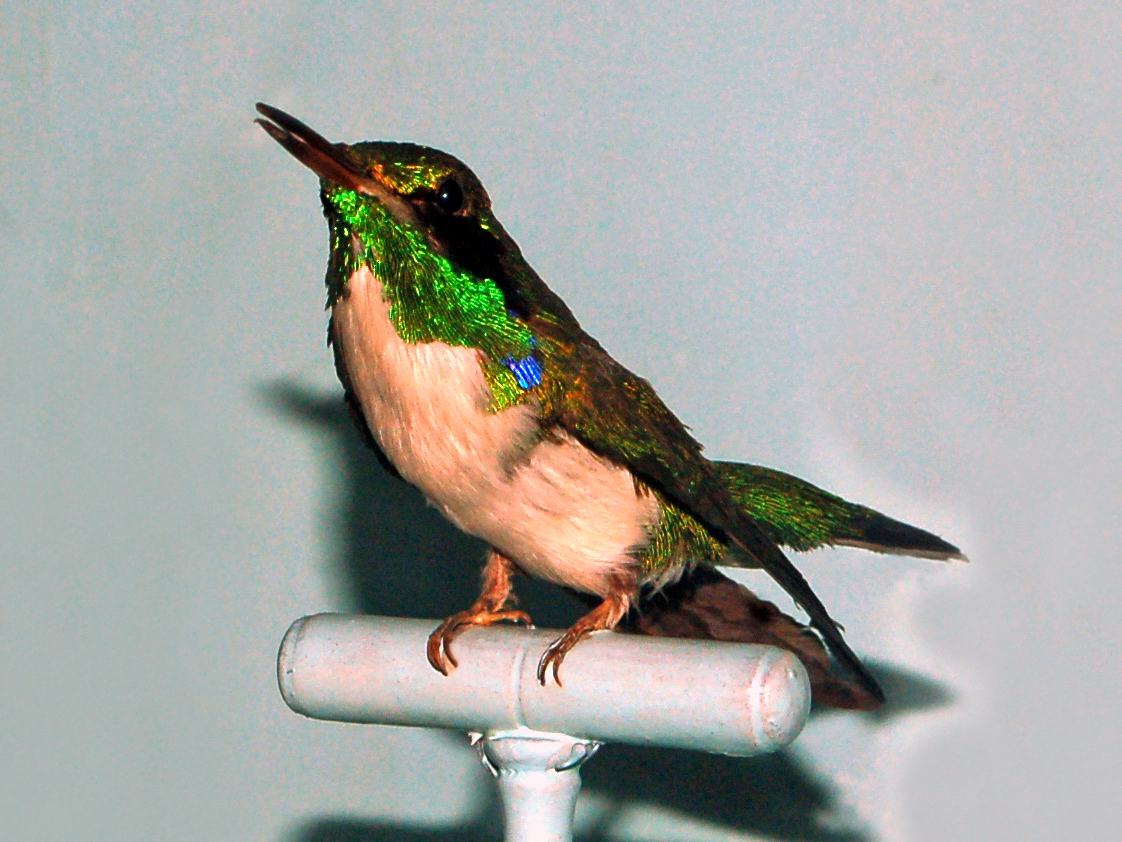
Heliothryx auritus. A mounted specimen

== Description ==
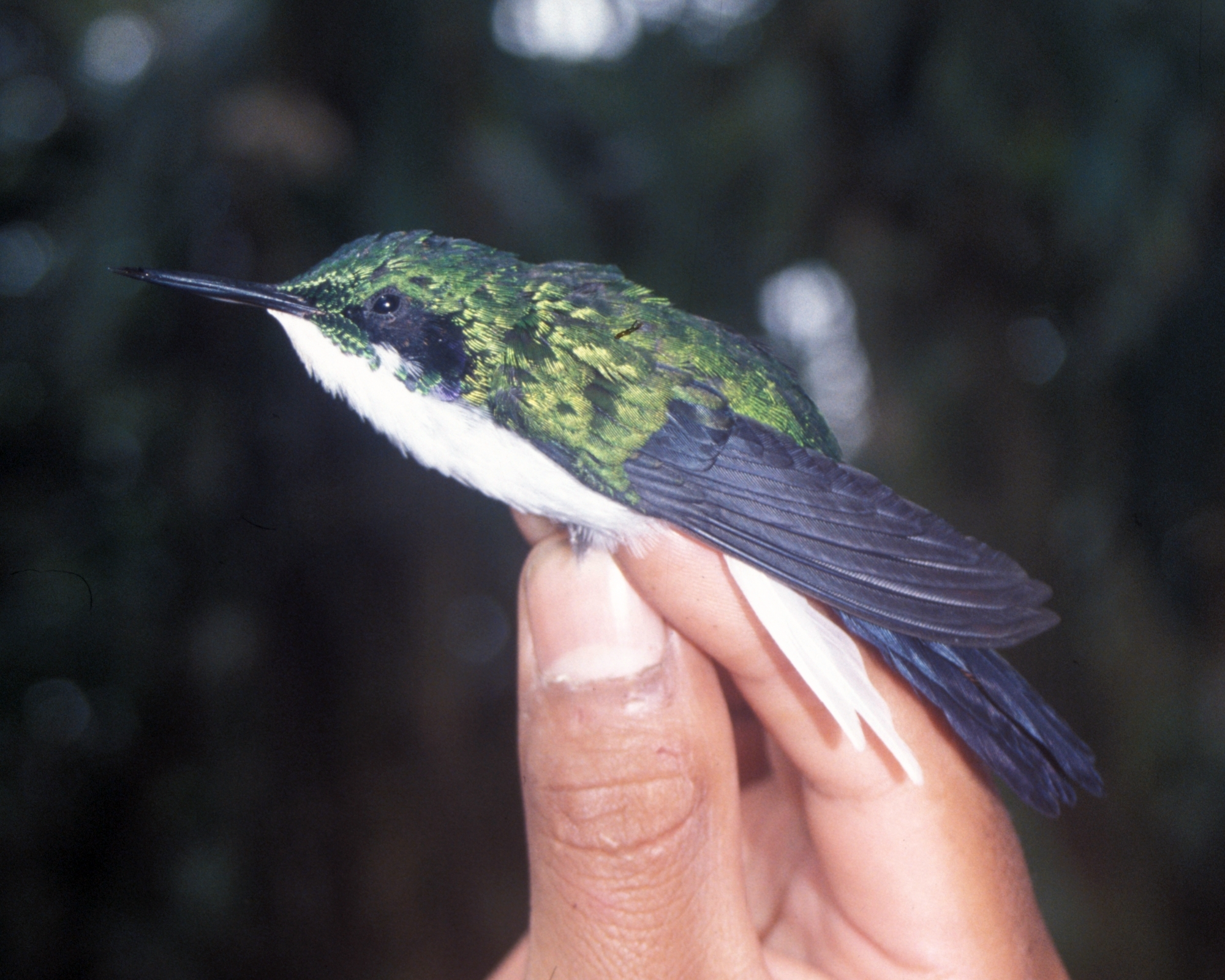
Black-eared fairy held in hand

The black-eared fairy is 10.1 to 13.7 cm (4.0 to 5.4 in) long and weighs 4 to 6.3 g (0.14 to 0.22 oz). The nominate male has bright shiny green upperparts, pure white underparts, and a long pointed tail which has darkish blue central and white outer feathers. It has a black patch below the eye, glittering purple ear coverts, and a short, straight, black bill. The female is similar but has no purple on the face, its throat and breast have grayish dots, and the three outer pairs of tail feathers have a black band at their base. Immatures have cinnamon fringes on their upperparts' plumage and are otherwise similar to the female. The male H. a. auriculatus has green on the chin and the sides of its throat. The male H. a. phainolaemus has a variable green throat and chin and the female does not have the nominate's gray spots on the underparts.

The calls include "a short high-pitched 'tsit' and richer 'tchip', repeated at intervals."

== Distribution and habitat ==
The nominate subspecies of black-eared fairy is found from southeastern Colombia and eastern Ecuador through northern Brazil north of the Amazon River to northeastern Venezuela and through the Guianas. H. a. phainolaemus is found in the Brazilian states of Pará and Maranhão south of the Amazon. H. a. auriculatus has two separate populations. One is in eastern Peru, central Bolivia, and central Brazil south of the Amazon as far east as the Tapajós River. Its other population is in southeastern Brazil from Bahia south to São Paulo (state) and irregularly further south. The species inhabits the interior and edges of wet primary and secondary forest. In elevation it is most common below 400 m (1,300 ft) but it occurs as high as 800 m (2,600 ft).

The black-eared fairy is believed to be sedentary, but some irregular movements have been reported in southern Brazil.

== Behavior ==
=== Food and feeding ===
The black-eared fairy mostly forages in the mid-story and canopy, though in terra firme forest it will forage at all levels. It takes nectar from a variety of flowering plants, both by inserting its bill into the corolla and by piercing the base of the flower to "rob" nectar. It also feeds on small insects on the wing, unlike the purple-crowned fairy.

=== Breeding ===
The black-eared fairy breeds throughout the year. The female alone builds the nest, incubates the eggs, and cares for the young. It makes a small cup nest of plant down on a vertical branch, usually between 3 and 30 m (9.8 and 98 ft) above the ground. The clutch size is two eggs. The incubation time is 15 to 16 days with fledging 23 to 26 days after hatch. It breeds for the first time when in its second year.

== Status ==
The International Union for Conservation of Nature has assessed the black-eared fairy as being of Least Concern, though its population size is not known and believed to be decreasing. It has a very large range, is considered fairly common in parts of it, and occurs in several protected areas.
