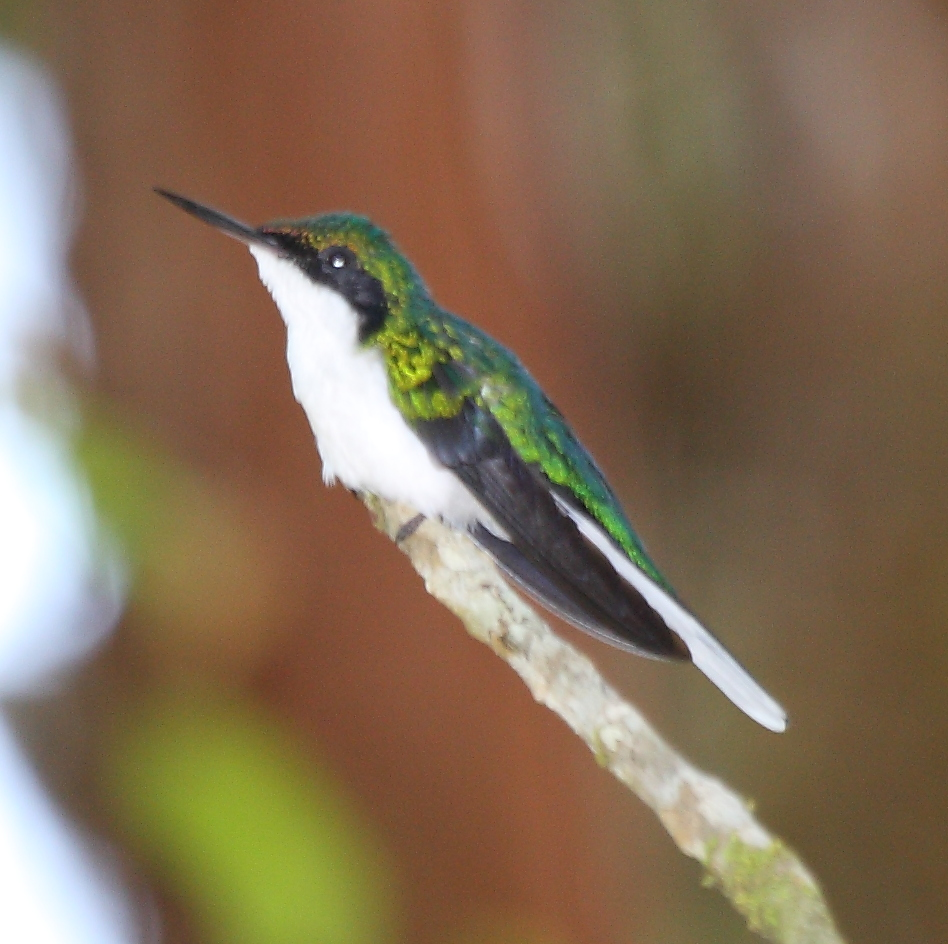
- Purple-crowned fairy (Heliothryx barroti)

Scientific classification
- Kingdom: Animalia
- Phylum: Chordata
- Class: Aves
- Order: Apodiformes
- Family: Trochilidae
- Subfamily: Polytminae
- Genus: Heliothryx; F. Boie, 1831

Type species
- Trochilus auritus (black-eared fairy) Gmelin, JF, 1788

Species
- 2, see text

= Heliothryx =

Genus of birds

Heliothryx is a genus of hummingbird in the family Trochilidae. The genus is assigned to the subfamily Polytminae which is sometimes referred to by the informal name "mangoes".

== Taxonomy ==
The genus Heliothryx was introduced in 1831 by the German zoologist Friedrich Boie. Boie did not specify the type species but this was designated as the black-eared fairy by George Robert Gray in 1840. The genus name combines the Ancient Greek hēlios meaning "sun" with thrix meaning "hair".

The genus contains the following two species:

== Physical Description and Habitat ==
Heliothryx hummingbirds are vibrant, medium-sized birds of tropical lowlands, favoring forest edges, clearings, and gardens. They have emerald-green upperparts, snow-white underparts, and white tail feathers, with sharp black bills perfectly designed to extract nectar. Males have a purple crown, absent in females, who have longer tails.

Genus Heliothryx – F. Boie, 1831 – two species
Common name	Scientific name and subspecies	Range	Size and ecology	IUCN status and estimated population
Black-eared fairy	Heliothryx auritus (Gmelin, JF, 1788) Three subspecies: H. a. auritus (Gmelin, JF, 1788) – southeast Colombia and east Ecuador through Venezuela, the Guianas and north Brazil; H. a. phainolaemus Gould, 1855 – north-central Brazil (south of the Amazon); H. a. auriculatus (Nordmann, 1835) – east Peru to central Bolivia and central, east Brazil	Bolivia, Brazil, Colombia, Ecuador, French Guiana, Guyana, Peru, Suriname, and Venezuela	Size: Habitat: Diet:	LC
Purple-crowned fairy	Heliothryx barroti (Bourcier, 1843)	southeastern Mexico south to southwestern Ecuador.	Size: Habitat: Diet:	LC
