= Nectar robbing =

Foraging behavior

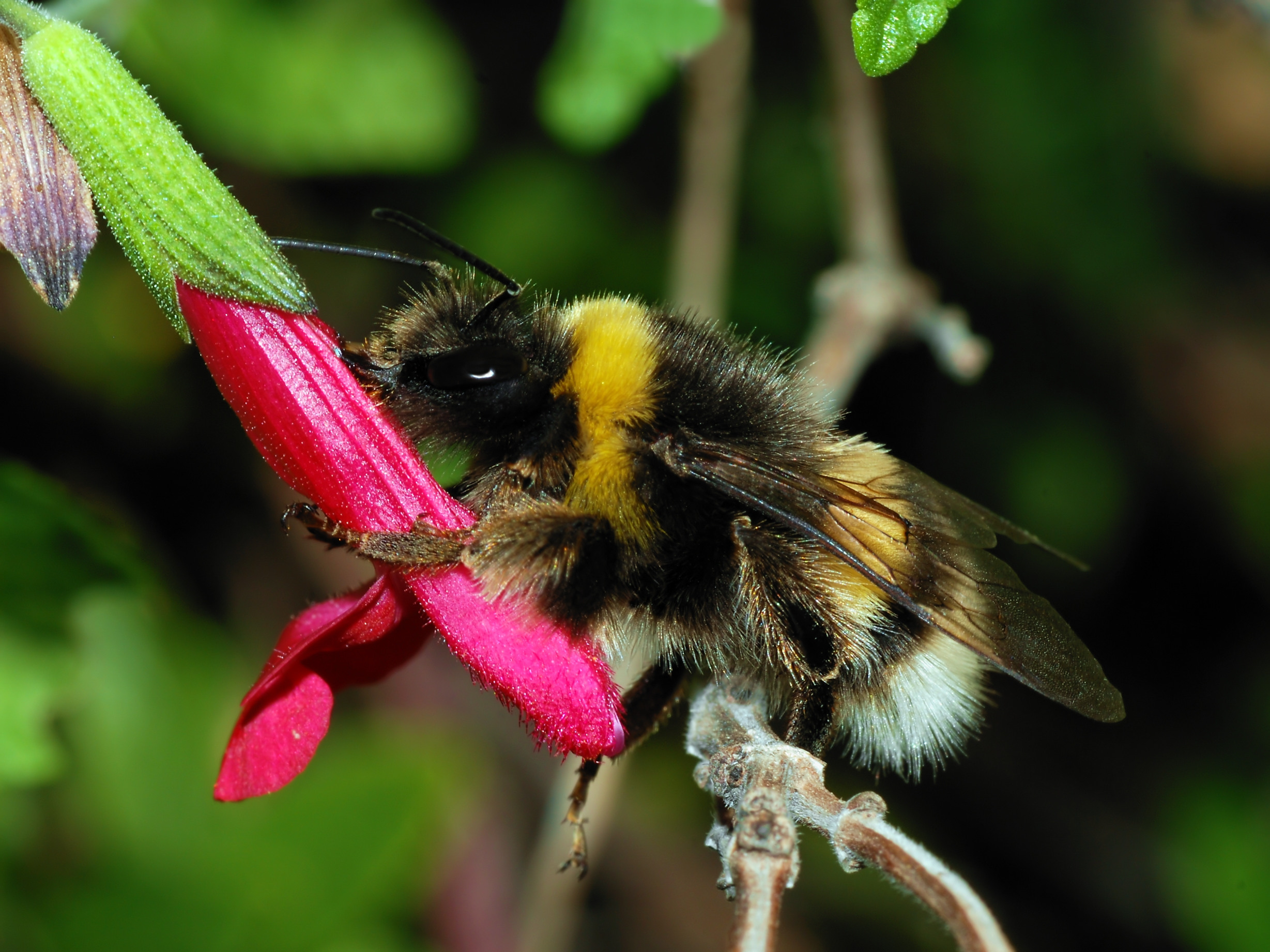
Bombus terrestris stealing nectar

Nectar robbing is a foraging behavior used by some organisms that feed on floral nectar, carried out by feeding from holes bitten in flowers, rather than by entering through the flowers' natural openings. Nectar robbers usually feed in this way, avoiding contact with the floral reproductive structures, and therefore do not facilitate plant reproduction via pollination. Because many species that act as pollinators also act as nectar robbers, nectar robbing is considered to be a form of exploitation of plant-pollinator mutualism. While there is variation in the dependency on nectar for robber species, most species rob facultatively (that is, to supplement their diets, rather than as an absolute necessity). The terms nectar theft and floral larceny have also been used in literature.

Nectar robbers vary greatly in species diversity and include species of carpenter bees, bumblebees, stingless Trigona bees, solitary bees, wasps, ants, hummingbirds, and some passerine birds, including flowerpiercers. Nectar-robbing mammals include the fruit bat and Swinhoe's striped squirrel, which rob nectar from the ginger plant.

== History ==
Records of nectar robbing in nature date back at least to 1793, when German naturalist Christian Konrad Sprengel observed bumblebees perforating flowers. This was recorded in his book, The Secret of Nature in the Form and Fertilization of Flowers Discovered, which was written in Berlin. Charles Darwin observed bumblebees stealing nectar from flowers in 1859. These observations were published in his book The Origin of Species.

== Forms of floral larceny ==
A female mountain carpenter bee robbing nectar from pineapple sage salvia without providing pollination services. The last scene played at one-fourth speed.

Nectar robbing is specifically the behavior of consuming nectar from a perforation (robbing hole) in the floral tissue rather than from the floral opening. There are two main types of nectar robbing: primary robbing, which requires that the nectar forager perforate the floral tissues itself, and secondary robbing, which is foraging from a robbing hole created by a primary robber.

The former is performed most often on flowers whose nectar is concealed or hard to reach. For instance, long flowers with tubular corollas are prone to robbing. Secondary robbers often do not have suitable mouth parts to be able to create penetrations into the flowers themselves, nor to reach the nectar without robbing it. Thus they take advantage of the perforations already made by other organisms to be able to steal the nectar. For example, short-tongued bees such as the early bumblebee (Bombus pratorum) are unable to reach the nectar located at the base of long flowers such as comfreys. In order to access the nectar, the bee will enter the flower through a hole bitten at the base, stealing the nectar without aiding in pollination. Birds are mostly primary robbers and typically use their beaks to penetrate the corolla tissue of flower petals. The upper mandible is used to hold the flower while the lower mandible creates the hole and extracts the nectar. While this is the most common method employed by bird species, some steal nectar in a more aggressive manner. For example, bullfinches reach the nectar by completely tearing the corolla off from the calyx. Mammal robbers such as the striped squirrel chew holes at the base of the flower and then consume the nectar.

The term "floral larceny" has been proposed to include the entire suite of foraging behaviors for floral rewards that can potentially disrupt pollination. They include "nectar theft" (floral visits that remove nectar from the floral opening without pollinating the flower), and "base working" (removing nectar from in between petals, which generally bypasses floral reproductive structures). Individual organisms may exhibit mixed behaviors, combining legitimate pollination and nectar robbing, or primary and secondary robbing. Nectar robbing rates can also greatly vary temporally and spatially. The abundance of nectar robbing can fluctuate based on the season or even within a season. This inconsistency displayed in nectar robbing makes it difficult to label certain species as "thieves" and complicates research on the ecological phenomenon of nectar robbing.

== Effects on plant fitness ==
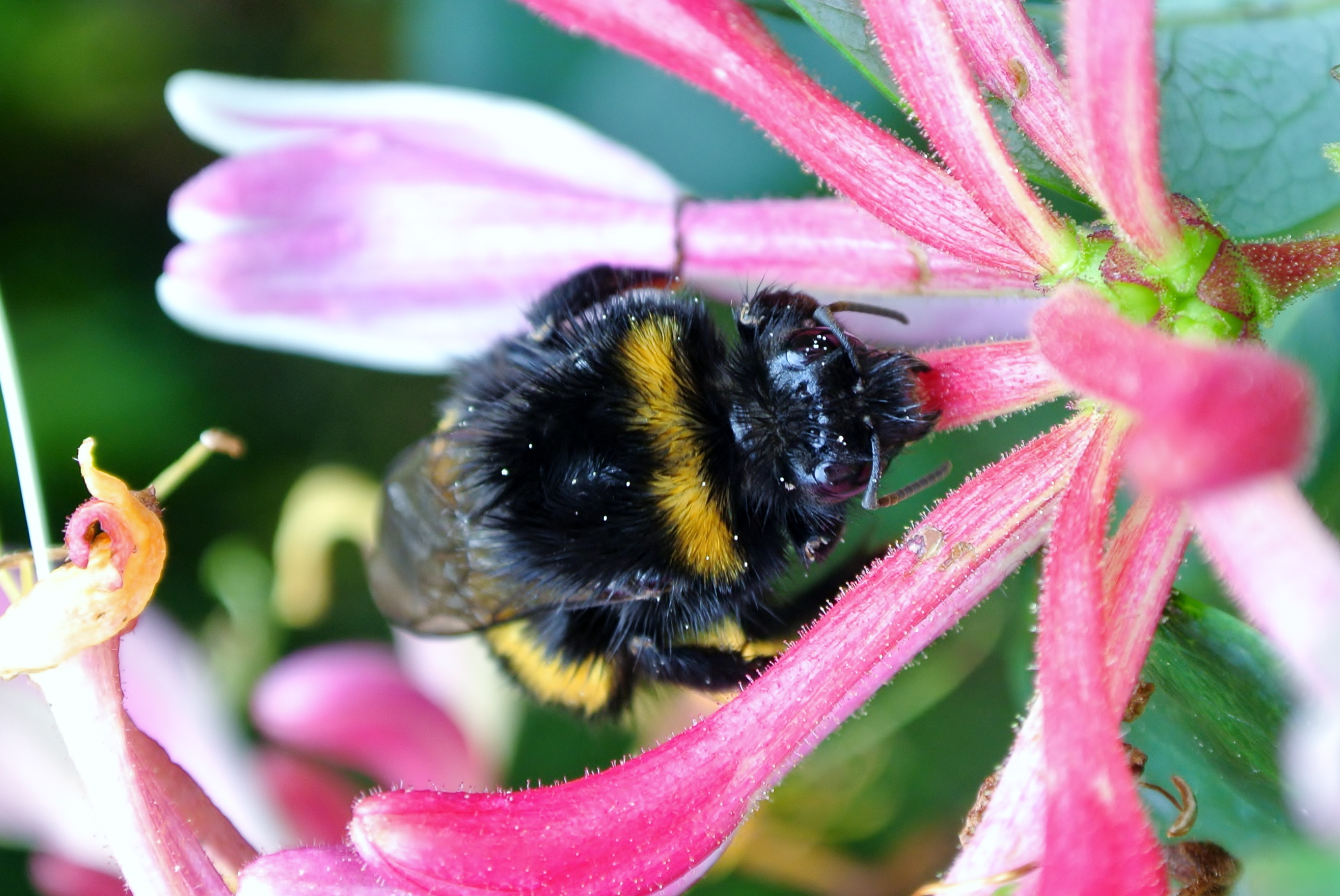
Biting open the base of a flower...

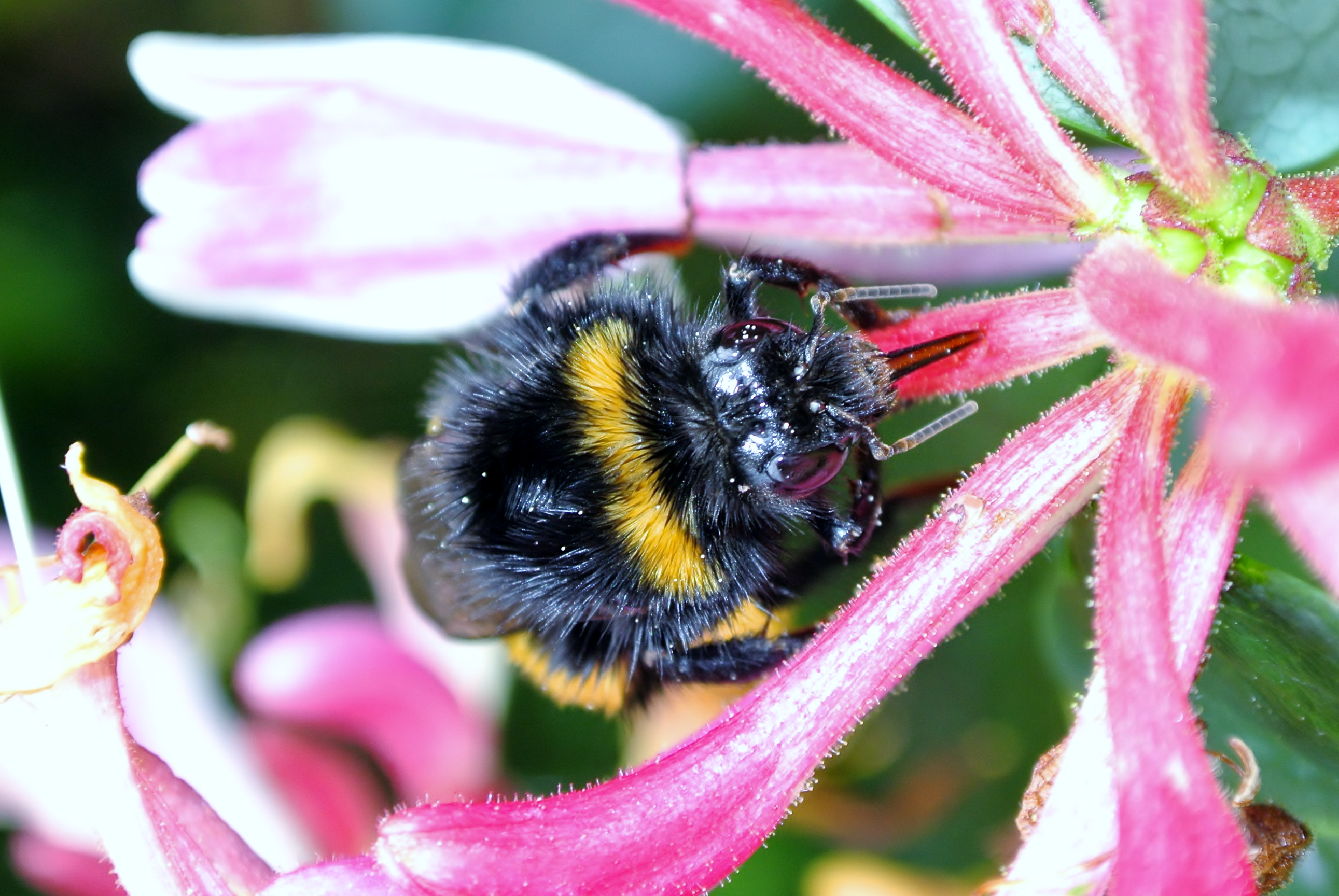
...and using its tongue to drink the nectar.

A bumblebee "nectar robbing" a flower

Pollination systems are mostly mutualistic, meaning that the plant benefits from the pollinator's transport of male gametes and the pollinator benefits from a reward, such as pollen or nectar. As nectar robbers receive the rewards without direct contact with the reproductive parts of the flower, their behaviour is easily assumed to be cheating. However, the effect of robbery on the plant is sometimes neutral or even positive. For example, the proboscis of Eurybia elvina does not come in contact with the reproductive parts of the flower in Calathea ovandensis, but this does not lead to significant reduction in fruit-set of the plant. In another example, when 80 percent of the flowers in a study site were robbed and the robbers did not pollinate, neither the seed nor fruit set were negatively affected.

The effect of floral-nectar robbing on plant fitness depends on several issues. Firstly, nectar robbers, such as carpenter bees, bumble bees and some birds, can pollinate flowers. Pollination may take place when the body of the robber contacts the reproductive parts of the plant while it robs, or during pollen collection which some bees practice in concert with nectar robbing. The impact of Trigona bees (e.g. Trigona ferricauda) on a plant is almost always negative, probably because their aggressive territorial behaviour effectively evicts legitimate pollinators. Nectar robbers may change the behaviour of legitimate pollinators in other ways, such as by reducing the amount of nectar available. This may force pollinators to visit more flowers in their nectar foraging. The increased number of flowers visited and longer flight distances increase pollen flow and outcrossing, which is beneficial for the plant because it lessens inbreeding depression. This requires a robber's not completely consuming all of a flower's nectar. When a robber consumes all of a flower's nectar, legitimate pollinators may avoid the flower, resulting in a negative effect on plant fitness.

The response of different species of legitimate pollinators also varies. Some species, like the bumble bees Bombus appositus or B. occidentalis and many species of nectar-feeding birds can distinguish between robbed and unrobbed plants and minimize their energy cost of foraging by avoiding heavily robbed flowers. Pollinating birds may be better at this than insects, because of their higher sensory capability. The ways that bees distinguish between robbed and unrobbed flowers have not been studied, but they have been thought to be related to the damage on petal tissue after robbery or changes in nectar quality. Xylocopa sonorina steals nectar through a slit they make in the base of the petals. If nectar robbing severely reduces the success of legitimate pollinators they may be able to switch to other nectar sources.

The functionality of flowers can be curtailed by nectar robbers that severely maim the flower by shortening their life span. Damaged flowers are less attractive and thus can lead to a decrease in visit frequency as pollinators practice avoidance of robbed flowers and favor intact flowers. Nectar robbers that diminish the volume of nectar in flowers may also leave behind their odor which causes a decrease in visitation frequency by legitimate pollinators. Nectar robbing can also cause plants to reallocate resources from reproduction and growth to replenishing the stolen nectar, which can be costly to produce for some plants.

Nectar robbing, especially by birds, can damage the reproductive parts of a flower and thus diminish the fitness of a plant. In this case, the effect of robbery on a plant is direct. A good example of an indirect effect is the change in the behaviour of a legitimate pollinator, which either increases or decreases the fitness of a plant. There are both primary and secondary nectar robbers. Secondary robbers are those that take advantage of the holes made by primary robbers. While most flies and bees are secondary robbers, some species, such as Bombylius major, act as primary robbers.

The effect of robbing is positive if the robber also pollinates or increases the pollination by the legitimate pollinator, and negative if the robber damages the reproductive parts of a plant or reduces pollination success, either by competing with the legitimate pollinator or by lessening the attractiveness of the flower. Positive reproductive results may occur from nectar robbing if the robbers act as pollinators during the same or different visit. The holes created by primary robbers may attract more secondary robbers that commonly search for nectar and collect pollen from anthers during the same visit. Additionally, certain dense arrangements of flowers allow pollen to be transferred when robber birds pierce holes into flowers to access the nectar. Thus, plant reproduction can potentially be boosted from nectar robbing due to the increase in potential pollen vectors. Distinguishing between a legitimate pollinator and a nectar robber can be difficult.

== Evolutionary implications ==
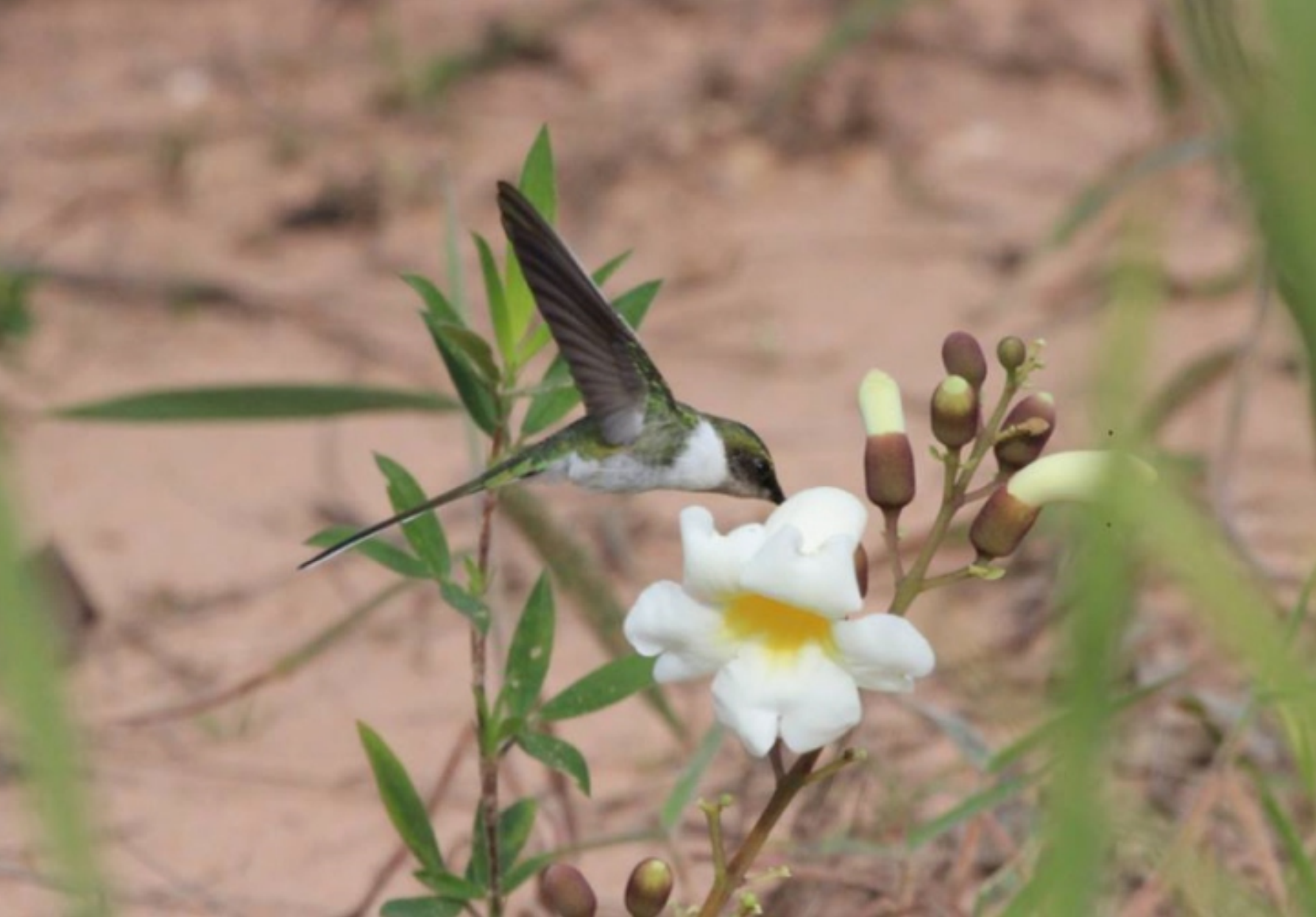
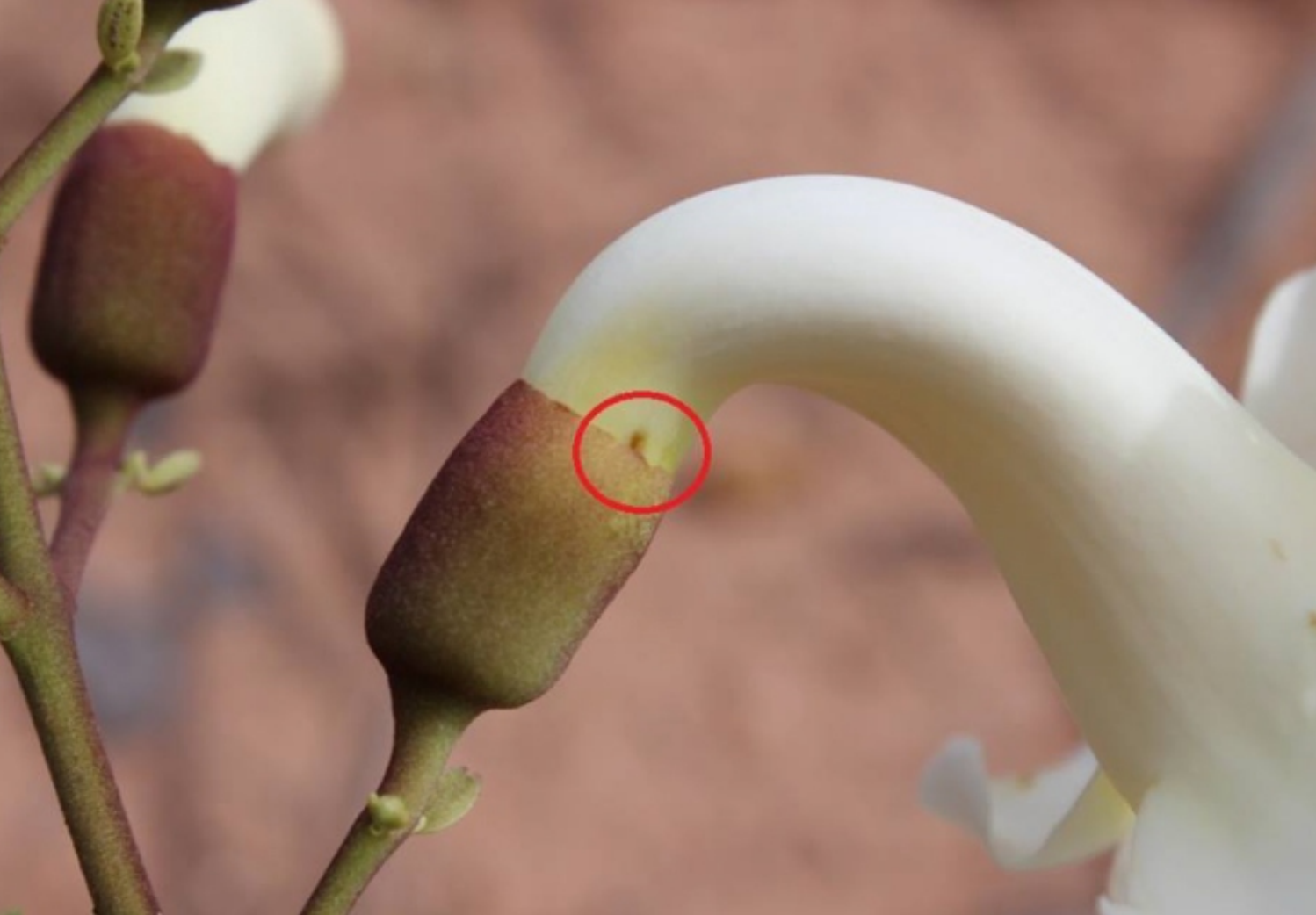
Female of a hummingbird, the horned sungem, robbing nectar from the plant Amphilophium elongatum (top), and hole used to obtain the nectar (bottom, red circle)

Pollination systems cause coevolution, as in the close relationships between figs and fig wasps as well as yuccas and yucca moths. If nectar robbers have an effect (direct or indirect) on a plant or pollinator fitness, they are part of the coevolution process. Where nectar robbing is detrimental to the plant, a plant species might evolve to minimize the traits that attract the robbers or develop some type of protective mechanism to hinder them. Another option is to try to neutralize negative effects of nectar robbers. Nectar robbers are adapted for more efficient nectar robbing: for instance, hummingbirds and Diglossa flowerpiercers have serrated bills that are thought to aid them in incising flower tissue for nectar robbing.

Nectar robbers may only get food in illegitimate ways because of the mismatch between the morphologies of their mouthparts and the floral structure; or they may rob nectar as a more energy-saving way to get nectar from flowers.

It is not completely clear how pollination mutualisms persist in the presence of cheating nectar robbers. Nevertheless, as exploitation is not always harmful for the plant, the relationship may be able to endure some cheating. Mutualism may simply confer a higher payoff than nectar robbing. Some studies have shown that nectar robbing does not have a significant negative effect on the reproductive success of both male and female plants.

== Defences in flowering plants ==
Even though there has not been much research on the defences evolved in plants against nectar robbers, the adaptations have been assumed not to rise from traits used in interactions between plants and herbivores (especially florivores). Some defences may have evolved through traits originally referred to pollination. Defences against nectar robbers have been thought to include toxins and secondary compounds, escape in time or space, physical barriers and indirect defences.

Toxins and secondary compounds are likely to act as a defence against nectar robbing because they are often found in floral nectar or petal tissue. There is some evidence that secondary compounds in nectar only affect nectar robbers and not the pollinators. One example is a plant called Catalpa speciosa which produces nectar containing iridoid glycosides that deter nectar-thieving ants but not legitimate bee pollinators. Low sugar concentration in nectar may also deter nectar robbers without deterring pollinators because dilute nectar does not yield net energy profits for robbers.

If robbers and pollinators forage at different times of day, plants may produce nectar according to the active period of a legitimate pollinator. This is an example of a defence by escaping in time. Another way to use time in defence is to flower only for one day as a tropical shrub Pavonia dasypetala does to avoid the robbing Trigona bees. Escaping in space refers to a situation in which plant avoids being robbed by growing in a certain location like next to a plant which is more attractive to the robbers.

The last two methods of protection are physical barriers and indirect defence like symbionts. Tightly packed flowers and unfavourably sized corolla tubes, bract liquid moats and toughness of the corolla or sepal are barriers for some nectar robbers. A good example of an indirect defence is to attract symbiotic predators (like ants) by nectar or other rewards to scare away the robbers.

The term 'resistance' refers to the plant's ability to live and reproduce in spite of nectar robbers. This may happen, for example, by compensating the lost nectar by producing more. With the help of defence and resistance, mutualisms can persist even in the presence of cheaters.
