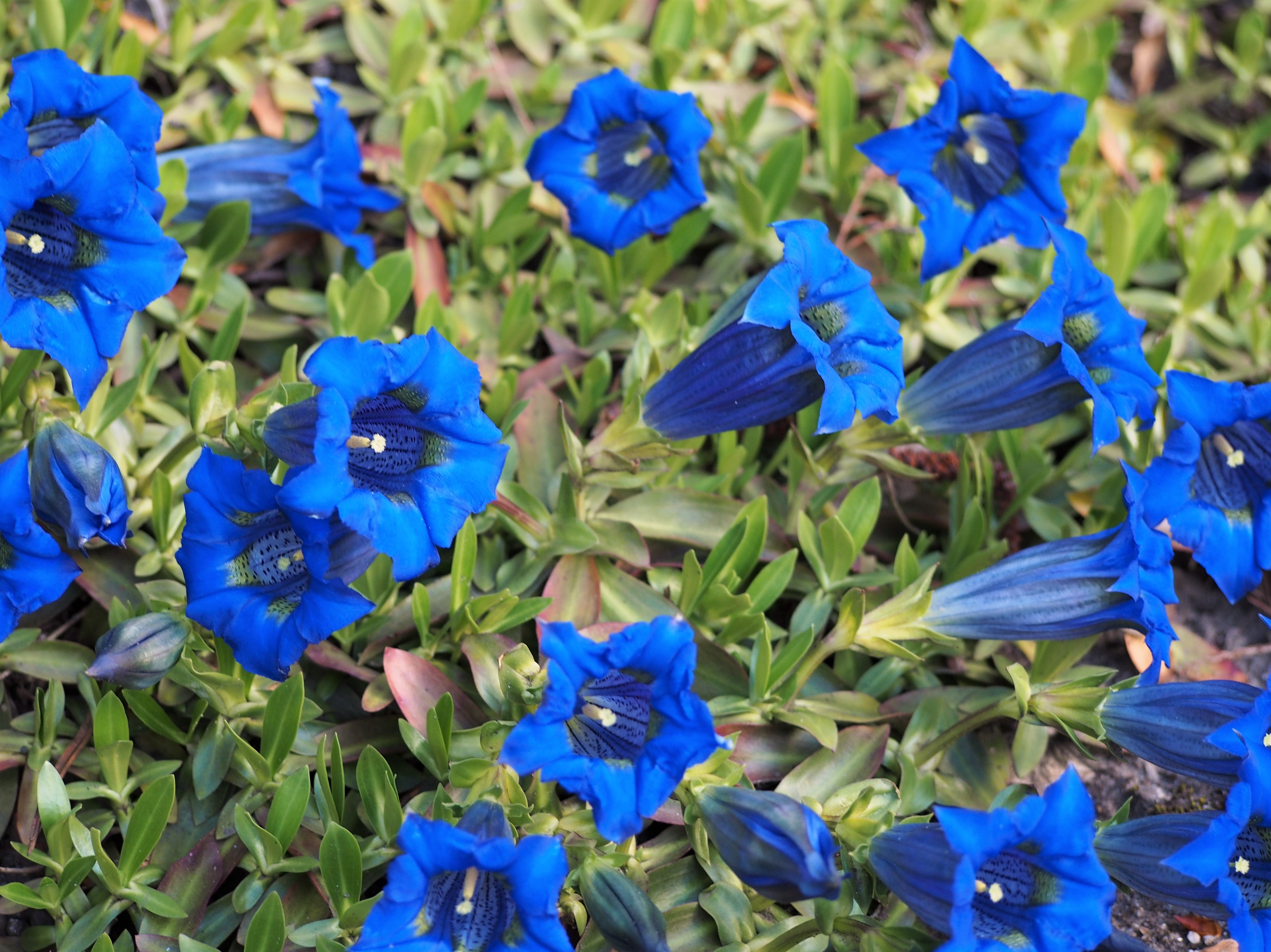

Conservation status
- Least Concern (IUCN 3.1)

Scientific classification
- Kingdom: Plantae
- Clade: Tracheophytes
- Clade: Angiosperms
- Clade: Eudicots
- Clade: Asterids
- Order: Gentianales
- Family: Gentianaceae
- Genus: Gentiana
- Species: G. acaulis

Binomial name
- Gentiana acaulis L.

Synonyms
- Synonyms of Gentiana acaulis: Gentianusa acaulis (L.) Pohl; Pneumonanthe acaulis (L.) F.W.Schmidt; Synonyms of Gentiana acaulis subsp. acaulis: Ciminalis acaulis Borkh.; Ciminalis grandiflora Mayrh.; Ciminalis longiflora Moench; Gentiana acaulis f. alba S.Redic; Gentiana acaulis var. minor (Nègre) Kerguélen; Gentiana excisa C.Presl; Gentiana grandiflora Lam.; Gentiana kochiana Perr. & Songeon; Gentiana kochiana var. minor Nègre; Gentiana latifolia (Gren. & Godr.) Jakow.; Gentiana vulgaris (Neilr.) Beck; Hippion alpinum F.W.Schmidt; Lexipyretum acaule Dulac; Pneumonanthe grandiflora Gray; Thylacitis grandiflora Delarbre; Synonyms of Gentiana acaulis subsp. acaulis: Ciminalis dinarica (Beck) Holub; Gentiana acaulis var. dinarica Beck; Gentiana dinarica (Beck) Beck

= Gentiana acaulis =

Species of plant

Gentiana acaulis, the stemless gentian, or trumpet gentian, is a species of flowering plant in the family Gentianaceae, native to central and southern Europe, from Spain east to the Balkans, growing especially in mountainous regions, such as the Alps and Pyrenees, at heights of 800–3,000 m (2,625–9,843 ft).

== Description ==
It is a perennial plant, growing up to a height of 10 centimetres (3.9 in) tall and forming a mat up to 50 centimetres (20 in) wide. The leaves, which can be lanceolate, elliptical or obovate, are evergreen, 2–3.5 cm long, in a basal rosette, forming clumps. The trumpet-shaped terminal flowers are blue with olive-green spotted longitudinal throats. They grow on a very short peduncle, 3–6 cm long. The flower stem is often without leaves, or has 1 or 2 pairs of leaves. It likes full sun, is fully hardy and flowers in late spring and summer.

The minute single crystals observed in its leaves are not true raphides.

== Horticulture ==
This plant, like others of its genus, is valued in cultivation for the unusually pure intense blue of its blooms. It has gained the Royal Horticultural Society's Award of Garden Merit.

== Etymology ==
The Latin specific epithet acaulis means "short-stemmed".

== Taxonomy ==
The closely related Gentiana clusii, often called by the same common name as this species, differs in its preference for limy (alkaline) soils. It also has shorter leaves and the flowers have no olive-green stripes.

=== Phylogeny ===
Phylogenetic research suggests G. acaulis is sister to a clade containing 4 other Gentiana species: G. verna, G. bavarica, G. nivalis, and G. utriculosa.

- - - G. alpina (alpine gentian)
    - G. clusii (sweet lady flower)
  - - - G. asclepiadea (willow gentian)
      - G. froelichii (Karawanken gentian)
    - - - - G. punctata (spotted gentian)
          - G. pannonica (brown gentian)
        - G. purpurea (purple gentian)
      - G. lutea (great yellow gentian)
- - G. acaulis
  - - - G. verna (spring gentian)
      - G. bavarica (Bavarian gentian)
    - - G. nivalis (snow gentian)
      - G. utriculosa (bladder gentian)

== Culture ==
A depiction of a gentian flower can be seen on the obverse side of Austrian € 0.01 euro coins.

== Images ==
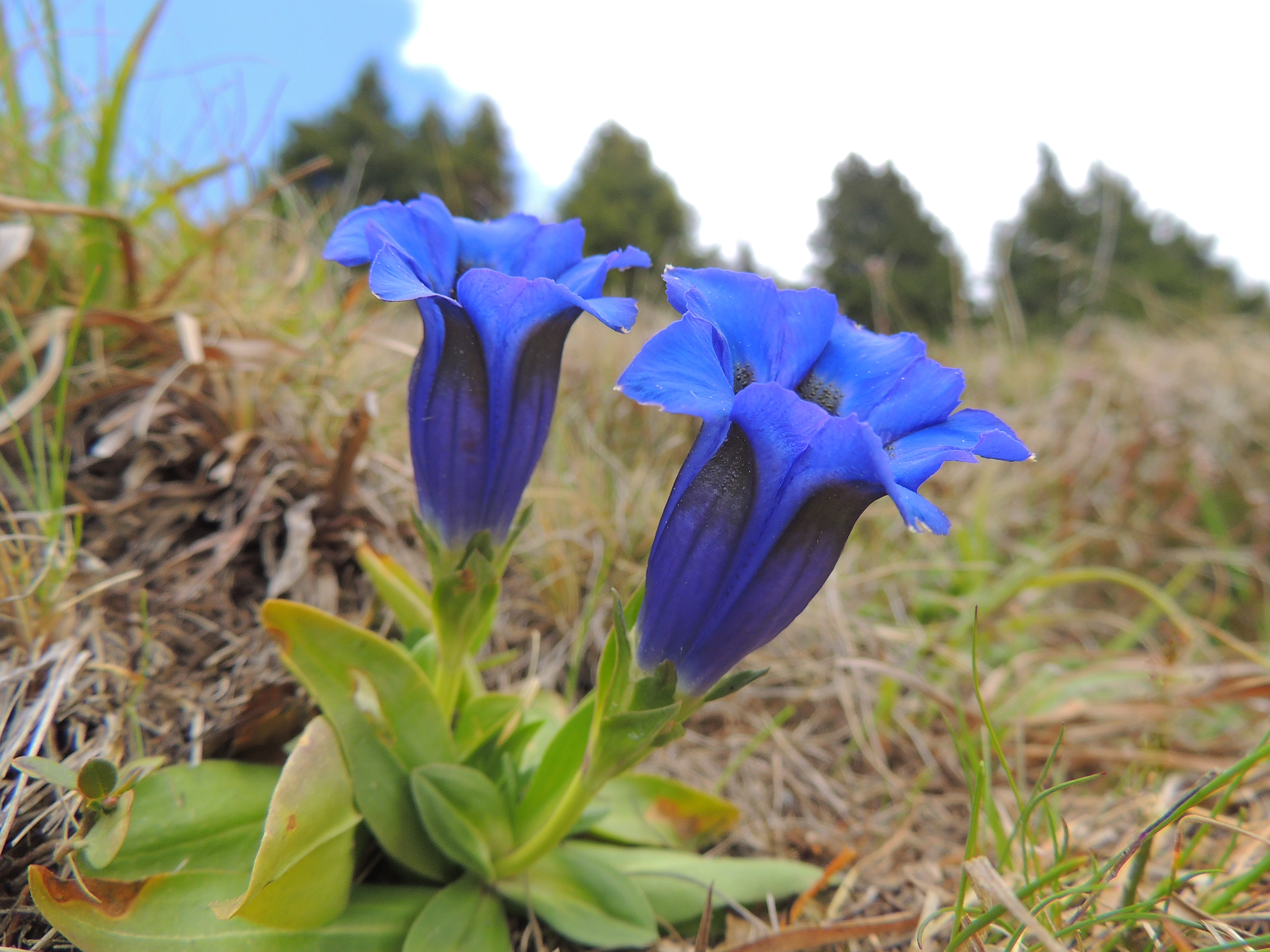

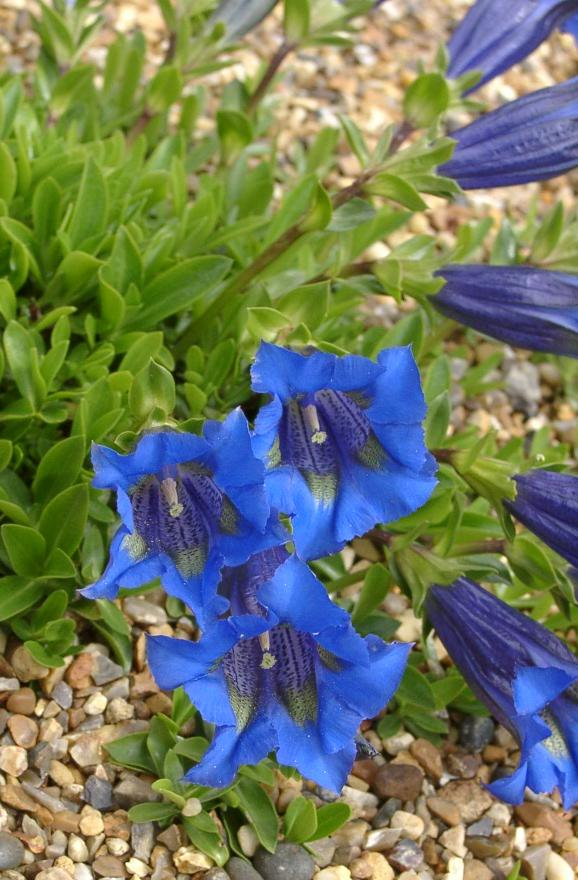

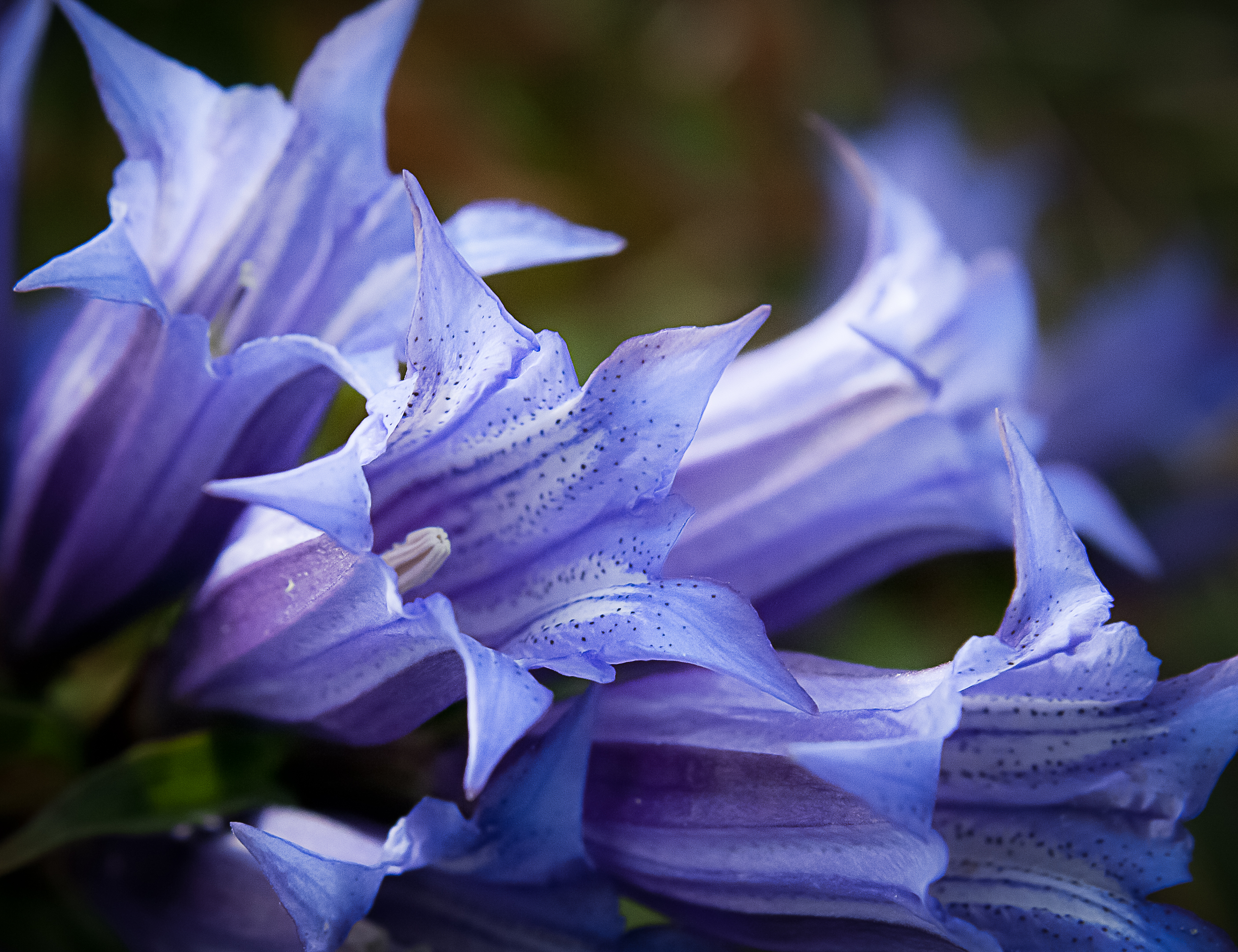

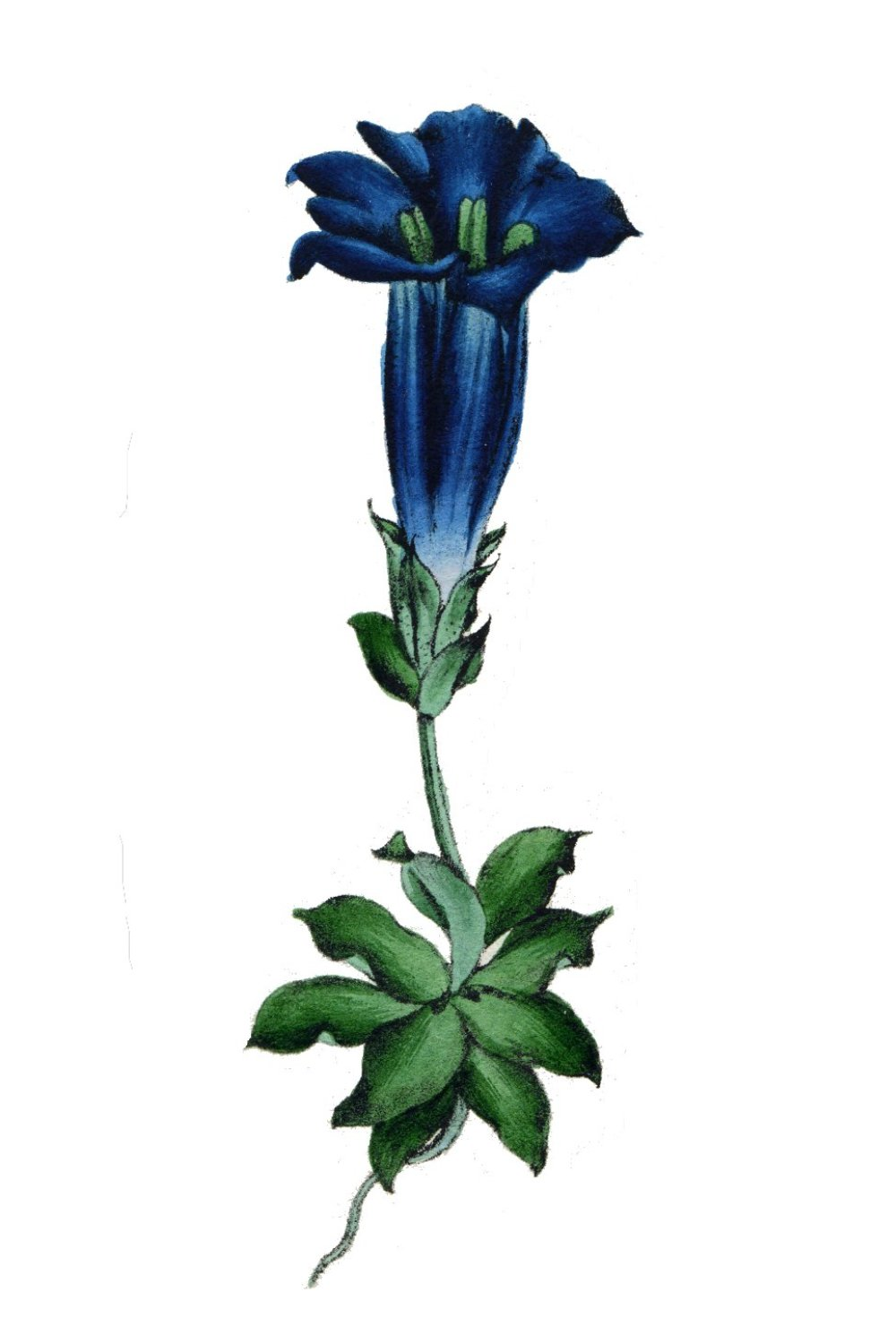

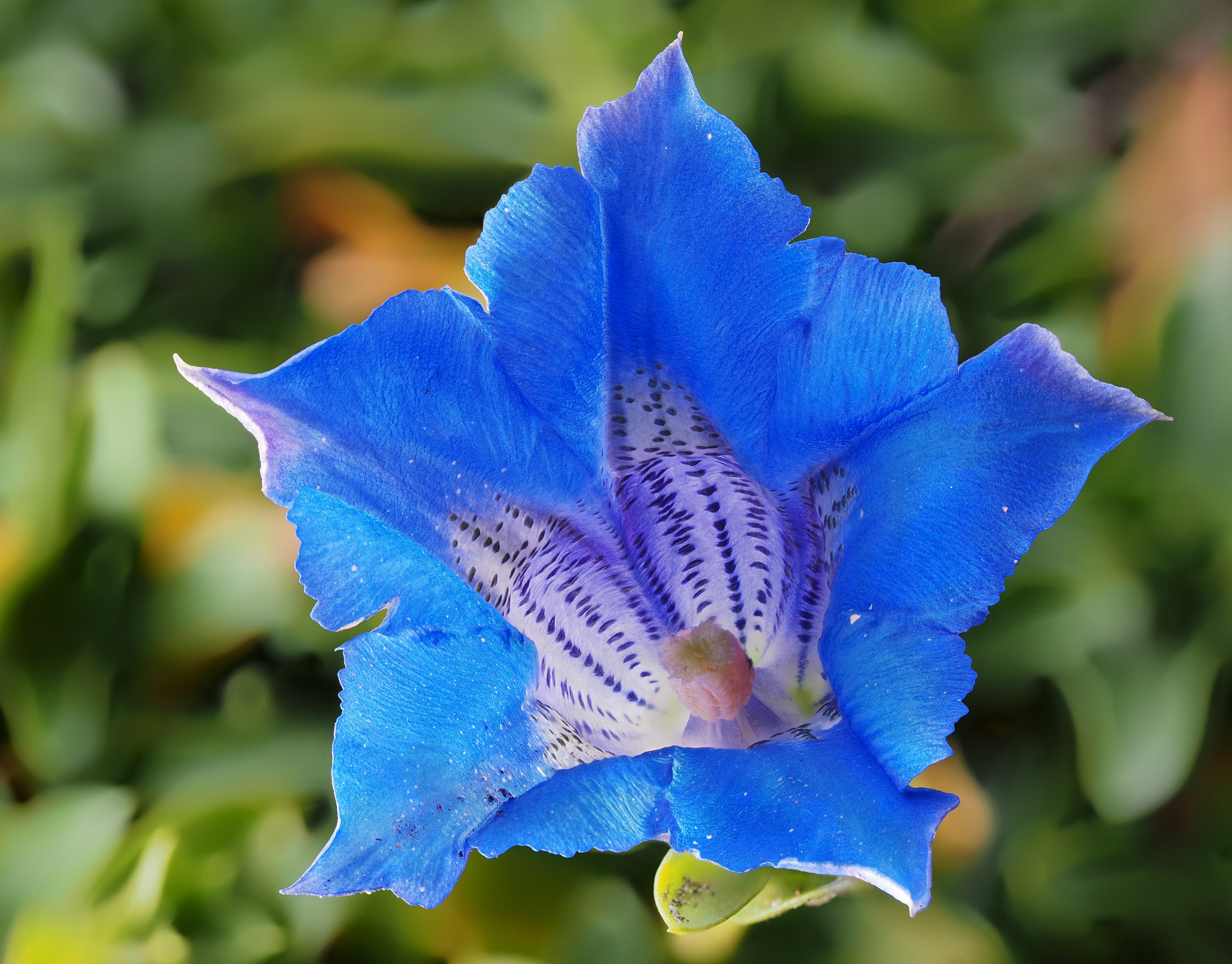

== Bibliography ==
- Gulliver, George (1864). "Observations on Raphides". The Annals and Magazine of Natural History, Including Zoology, Botany, and Geology. Third Series. 14: 53–56.
