= Botanical Garden of the University of Konstanz =

Botanical garden in Germany

Coordinates: 47.6921°N 9.1788°E

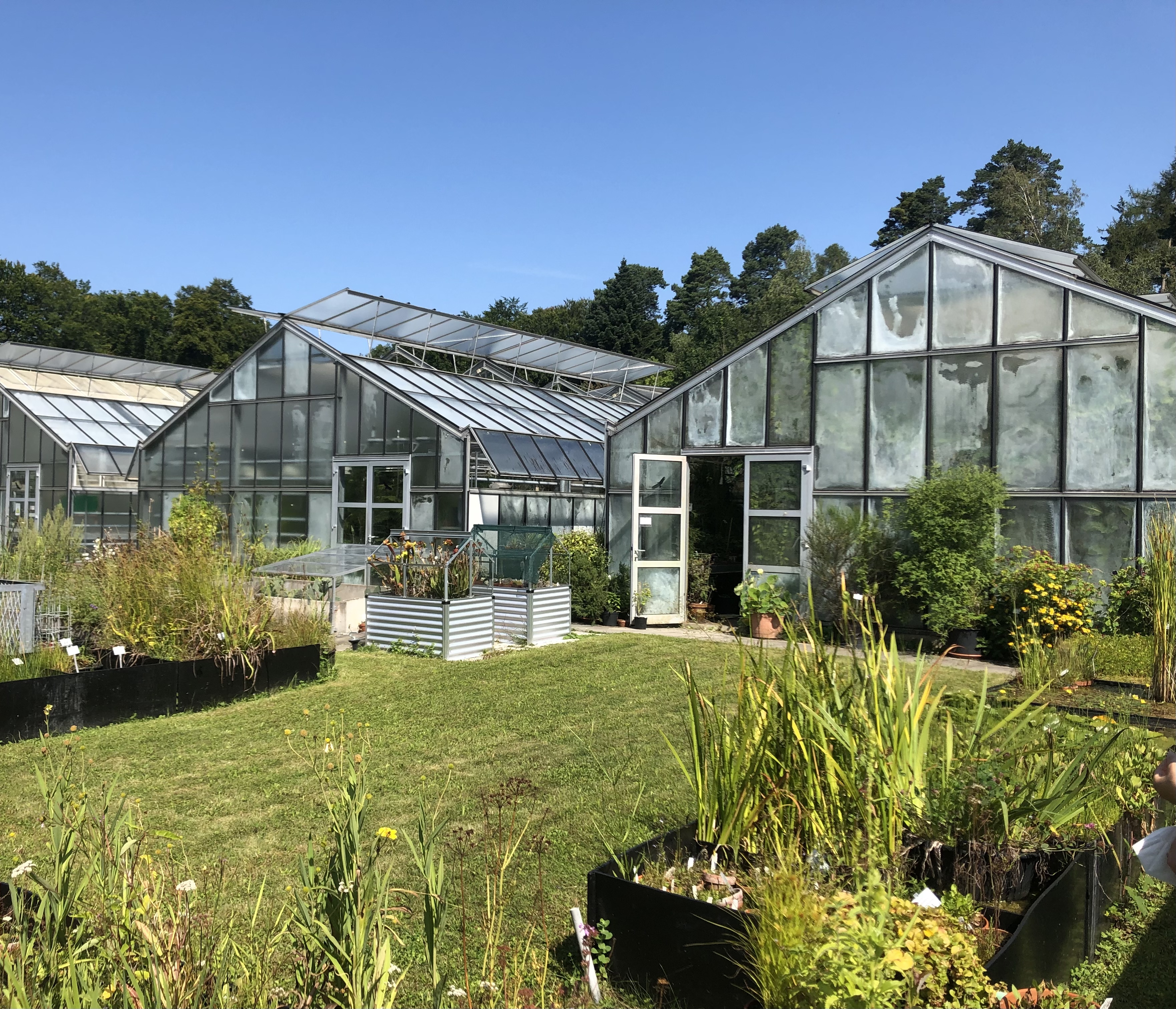
Greenhouses at the Botanic Garden

The Botanischer Garten der Universität Konstanz (1.5 hectares) is a botanical garden maintained by the University of Konstanz. It is located about 250 meters northwest of the campus north parking lot in Konstanz, Baden-Württemberg, Germany, and open weekdays without charge.

The garden was begun in 1972, with its first greenhouses completed in 1982. Additional greenhouses were added in 1993, and in 1997 its outdoor garden was redesigned and replanted.

Today the garden contains about 1400 species, including approximately 290 crop species outdoors and 160 tropical crop species in the greenhouse. Its major sections include regional plants (with a strong collection of beach grass and reed plants), apple trees, crops, and an extensive collection of wild herbs and weeds from fields and vineyards. The greenhouses contain a collection of tropical crops, tropical weeds, and plants that demonstrate animal-plant interactions, as well as a cold house containing over 460 species, including flora of the Canary Islands, Mediterranean plants, carnivorous plants, and succulents. Garden staff also maintain two nature trails.

Rare species from the Lake Constance region include Armeria purpurea, Blackstonia perfoliata, Deschampsia littoralis, Equisetum variegatum, Erucastrum nasturtiifolium, Gentiana utriculosa, Globularia punctata, Gratiola officinalis , Myosotis rehsteineri, Orchis coriophora, Orchis palustris, Oxytropis pilosa, Potentilla micrantha, Ranunculus reptans, and Samolus valerandi.

Research on crop stress and disease includes Arabidopsis thaliana, Coffea arabica, Fragaria vesca, Malus domestica, Medicago sativa, Phragmites australis, and Vicia faba.

== See also ==
- List of botanical gardens in Germany
