= Stemless gentian =

Stemless gentian is a common name for several plants and may refer to:

- Gentiana acaulis, native to central and southern Europe
- Gentiana clusii, native to Europe
