= University of Konstanz =

University in Konstanz, Germany

- Universität Konstanz
- Type: Public
- Established: 1966; 60 years ago
- Affiliations: German Excellence Universities, EUA, YERUN, IBH
- Budget: €188.65 million (2017)
- Rector: Katharina Holzinger
- Academic staff: 1,067
- Administrative staff: 850
- Students: 11,268 (WS 2018/19)
- Doctoral students: 1,165 (WS 2018/19)
- Location: Konstanz, Baden-Württemberg, Germany; 47°41′24″N 9°11′17″E
- Website: www.uni-konstanz.de

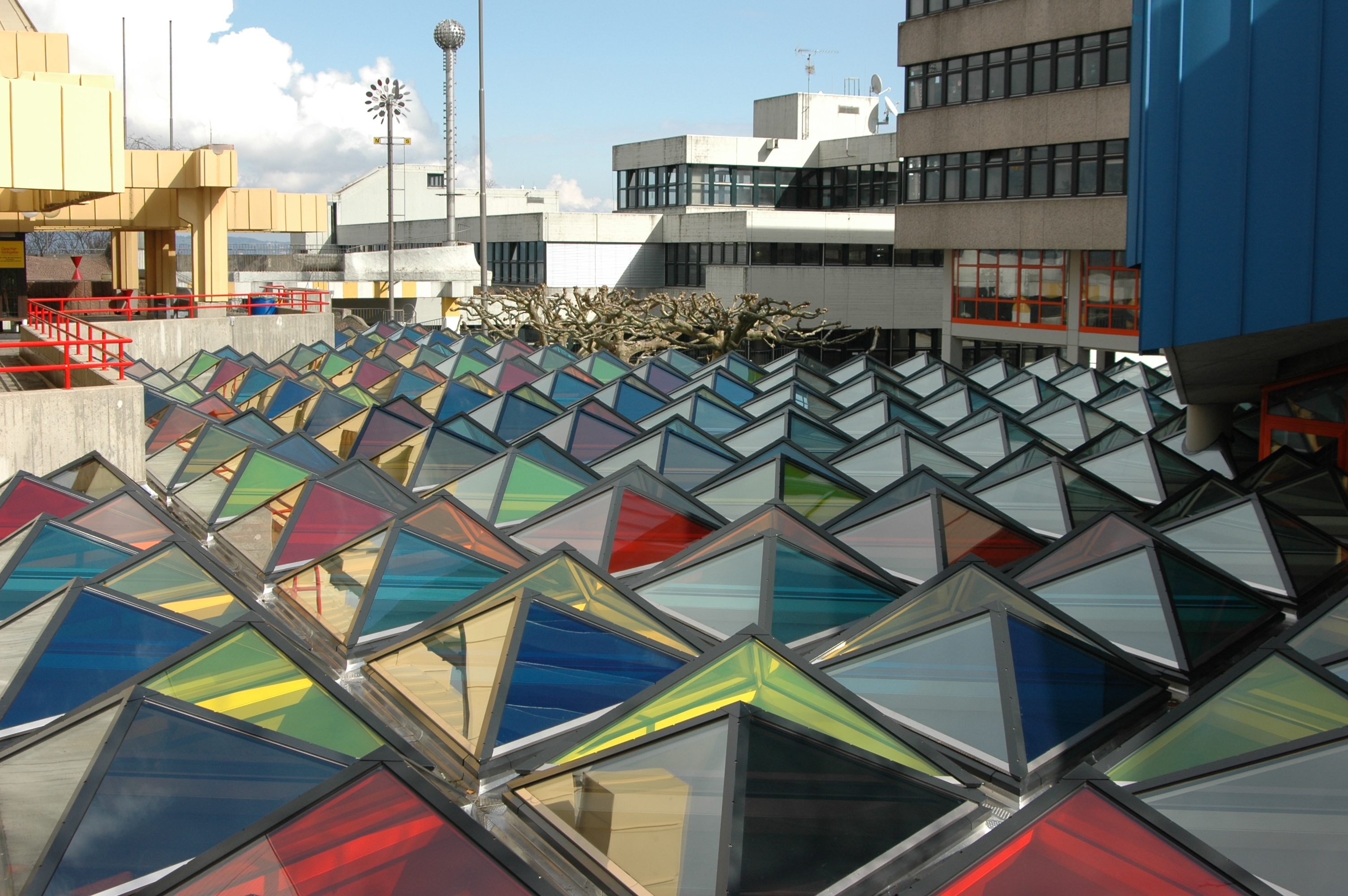
Foyer glas ceiling designed by Otto Piene (1970)

The University of Konstanz (German: Universität Konstanz) is a university in the city of Konstanz in Baden-Württemberg, Germany. Its main campus was opened on the Gießberg in 1972 after being founded in 1966. The university is Germany's southernmost university and is situated on the shore of Lake Constance just four kilometres from the Swiss border. It has been successful in the Excellence Initiative.

The University of Konstanz cooperates with a number of institutions, such as Harvard, Johns Hopkins University, Yale University, the University of Chicago, UC Berkeley, University of Zurich, and the Balsillie School of International Affairs.

In addition to having approximately 11,500 students from around 100 countries, the university maintains over 220 partnerships with European universities as well as numerous international exchange programmes, thereby facilitating global networking. Students may choose from more than 100 degree programmes. Its library is open 24 hours a day and has more than two million books.

== History ==
=== Origins ===
A university was briefly located in Konstanz during the 17th and 18th century. As a branch of the University of Freiburg, it was located in the Lanzenhof (today a building housing the administration of justice at the Untere Laube street) and existed from 1686 to 1698 as well as from 1713 to 1715.

The University of Konstanz was founded in 1966 as a reform university. In its early years it was located in various buildings in the inner city until 1972, when the campus was established on the Giessberg. The university logo was designed by Otl Aicher in 1980, one of the most well-known graphic designers of the 20th century.

Instead of creating institutes, the university was designed with (smaller than usual) departments and working groups, with a focus on developing teaching through research. In order to more easily transcend the boundaries between academic subjects and infrastructure, the Anglo-Saxon concept of the campus university was adapted, through which the administration and service providers such as the canteen and library have become easily accessible and centralised locations. The reform measures included the transformation of traditional learning and instructional mediums such as lectures to seminars or tutorials. The use of course-related performance assessments developed out of the implementation of these new measures.

=== Transitions ===
The single-stage legal education and training was adapted by the university in the context of a pilot programme in the 1970s and 1980s, in which the practical phase and university study were closely interlinked. At the beginning, the university also offered basic studies in social science through which students of administrative science, economics and law completed their studies together.

After many of these projects expired, the university "reinvented" itself in accordance with the recommendations from the Mittelstraßcommission: To promote even more intense collaboration within the university, it was divided into three faculties with a total of 13 departments in 1999. The departments replaced the previous schools and working groups and the tasks and responsibilities of these schools have since been carried out and fulfilled by the faculties in accordance with the Landeshochschulgesetz LHG (state law on higher education). The university's consistent use of centralised service providers has not changed. The 24-hour library, which provides easy access to all of its books, is a well-known feature of the university.

=== University of Excellence ===
The institutional strategy of the university, "Modell Konstanz – Towards a Culture of Creativity", was adopted on 19 October 2007 in the context of the German Excellence Initiative, which administered jointly by the German Research Foundation (DFG) and the German Council of Science and Humanities. Additionally, four Collaborative Research Centres (CRC) funded by the DFG are currently operating at the University of Konstanz. The "Zentrum für den wissenschaftlichen Nachwuchs" (ZWN) or Centre for Young Researchers was recognized in this third funding line of the German Excellence Initiative and stirred great interest across Germany, leading the press to refer to the university as the "mini Harvard at Lake Constance".

The ZWN was created in 2001 to support junior researchers in gaining access to the highest possible amount of funding and flexibility for their research. It was successfully incorporated into the Zukunftskolleg in late 2007, which was again recognised in the second round of the Excellence Initiative in 2012. In that same year, the Zukunftskolleg successfully applied for co-financing from the EU-funded "Marie Curie Actions COFUND" programme in the amount of 6.24 million euros. The resulting Zukunftskolleg Incoming Fellowship Programme (ZIF-Marie-Curie-Programme) allowed the Zukunftskolleg to further develop its fellowship programme by adding one additional international component.

The DFG's 2018 Funding Atlas once again confirmed the University of Konstanz's top national rankings from 2015 in regard to external funding obtained from the DFG. When comparing the funding in terms of per-capita values for all academic staff members (including professors), the university climbed one position to 1st place in Germany. Calculated on the basis of professors alone, the university's per-capita external funding volume ranked 2nd. When counting all acdacemic staff members, the per-capita funding totals in the life sciences, the humanities, and the social sciences were ranked 1st in Germany.

The University of Konstanz's status as a research-oriented university of excellence was reaffirmed in the second round of the Excellence Initiative competition in 2012. The university has also successfully participated in the Professorinnenprogramm (funding programme for female professors). In each of its two funding phases, two female professor positions were funded through this programme.

To optimise its services, the university's library, IT Service Centre and administrative IT were combined in 2012 to form the new organisational unit Communications, Information, Media Centre (KIM).

The Excellence Strategy of the German Federal and State Governments at the University of Konstanz: The University of Konstanz submitted three full cluster proposals to the DFG in February 2018. The funding decision for the Excellence Cluster funding line was announced on 27 September 2018: Two of the three submitted cluster initiatives will be funded: The "Centre for the Advanced Study of Collective Behaviour" and "The Politics of Inequality: Perceptions, Participation and Policies". Since two Clusters of Excellence are the prerequisite for competing in the second funding line "Universities of Excellence", the University of Konstanz has submitted a full proposal in this funding line in December 2018. The German Council of Science and Humanities will announce the final decision in regard to the second funding line in July 2019.

== Campus ==
=== Geography ===
The university comprises approximately 90,000 square metres and lies on the Gießberg within the Mainauwald (Mainau forest). It belongs to Konstanz's Egg district, with the old village of Egg located a distance of 200 metres from campus on the far side of the Mainaustrasse (Mainau street). Two pedestrian and bike bridges connect the university grounds to the village and lakeside. Just like the village, the university's sports grounds are located on the lakeside of the street, north of Egg. The university's botanical garden is located to the north-west of the north parking lot and is open on weekdays. Before the independent village of Allmannsdorf was merged with the city of Konstanz on 1 January 1915, all of the land that the university now occupies belonged to this former community.

=== Architecture ===
The university was designed as a customised space to facilitate social interaction between researchers, teachers and students, thereby departing from traditional university building layouts. Instead of a scattered array of individual buildings, architect Horst Linde drafted a compact university complex with interlinked buildings. The idea was to adapt the architecture to the hillside location, similar to a mountain village. Designer Wilhelm von Wolff's idea was that "people should be able to stroll through the university as if it were an old city centre with squares and alleyways that provide opportunities for casual encounters, perhaps with something mysterious here and there to rouse expectations". In order to shorten the routes to the centrally located Agora, the planners made it a requirement that the radius of the university area should not exceed 500 to 700 metres. Construction started in 1970 and lasted until 1983. Since then, the university has made several additions, all of which followed the original plans. In 2012, major university building sections were identified as historic monuments and provided official monument protection in recognition of their collective design and construction.

=== Percent for art ===
The following artworks have been constructed as part of Percent for art projects on university grounds: The glass roof (1972) consisting of 227 coloured pyramids in the main entrance area of the university, designed by Otto Piene; the pipe sculptures (1969–1974) by Friedrich Gräsel in the Hockgrabental; the gate structures (1984) by Georg Karl Pfahler; the spool sculpture (1972) by Gottfried Bechtold; and the wooden head sculptures (1993) by Stephan Balkenhols.

== Organization ==
=== Faculties and Departments ===
The 13 departments of the university are divided into three faculties:

==== Faculty of Sciences ====
- Biology
- Chemistry
- Computer and Information Science
- Mathematics and Statistics
- Physics
- Psychology

==== Faculty of Humanities ====
- History and Sociology
- Literary Studies
- Linguistics
- Philosophy

==== Faculty of Politics, Law and Economics ====
- Economics
- Law
- Politics and Public Administration

=== Central institutions ===
The university comprises several central institutions:

- The Communication, Information, Media Centre (KIM) is the university's primary service provider for IT and library services. KIM was created in 2014 by combining the library, IT Service Centre and administrative IT. It supports teaching, research and study at the University of Konstanz.
  - The library of the University of Konstanz is the central service provider for all literature and information needs at the University of Konstanz. It provides access to approximately two million freely accessible and systematically organised print media and 1,600 work stations in an area of 25,000 square metres at the heart of the university. The library was conceptually redesigned, adapted to current requirements and thoroughly renovated between 2011 and 2017 as part of a pollutant remediation project. The library services are responsible for making printed and electronic media accessible and answer all questions that are related to their service spectrum. The KonSearch literature search engine provides access to over 400 million digital and printed media items.
  - The IT services provide all the services required for the operation and further development of a university. In this way, both researchers and students can benefit from essential services such as the email system, the e-learning platform, campus management, IT security and central storage services.
- The International Office is responsible for advancing and sustaining international relations with other universities. It also provides support and guidance to visiting students and advises students interested in studying abroad.
- The Career Service is a university service provider established as a joint initiative between the university, the Chamber of Industry and Commerce Hochrhein-Bodensee and the Agentur für Arbeit Konstanz-Ravensburg (employment agency). It helps students prepare to enter the job market and assists employers in their search for new employees.
- The Language Institute (SLI) coordinates all foreign language training activities.
- Since 2010, the Student Service Centre (SSZ) has been providing one-stop service to students who need to complete bureaucratic procedures (enrol, pay fees, receive certificates).
- The central committees at the university are particularly important. A distinctive feature in Konstanz is the Committee on Research (AFF), which is a body of four representatives from each faculty (three professors and one academic staff member) that facilitates an equitable competition for research funds within the university. Every post-doc at the university can request staff funding and material resources from the AFF for up to two years. These funds are usually intended to provide start-up funding for third-party-funded research projects. The AFF is also responsible for distributing a substantial portion of the additional funds awarded through the Excellence Initiative.

The Studentenwerk Seezeit student services is a supra-regional service provider for German universities, including the University of Konstanz. Not only does it specialise in providing students consultation regarding BAFöG and other social services, but it is also responsible for food and refreshment services (canteen) as well as maintaining and assigning student accommodations (residence halls).

=== Research institutions ===
==== Collaborative Research Centres ====
- Anisotropic Particles as Building Blocks: Tailoring Shape, Interactions and Structures (SFB 1214)
- Chemical and Biological Principles of Cellular Proteostasis (SFB 969)
- Controlled Nanosystems: Interaction and Interfacing to the Macroscale (SFB 767)
- Quantitative Methods for Visual Computing (SFB-TRR 161)

==== Research groups ====
- The Dynamics of Risk – Perception and Behavior in the Context of Mental and Physical Health (Risk Dynamics – FOR 2374)
- New Insights into the Bcl-2 family interactions – from biophysics to function (FOR 2036)
- Nonlinear response to probe vitrification (FOR 1394)
- Mediale Teilhabe. Partizipation zwischen Anspruch und Inanspruchnahme (FOR 2252)
- PsychoEconomics (FOR 1882)
- Questions at the Interfaces (FOR 2111)
- What if? (FOR 1614)

==== Institutions in the context of the German Excellence Initiative ====
- Cluster of Excellence "Cultural Foundations of Social Integration"
- Konstanz Research School Chemical Biology
- Graduate School of Decision Sciences
- Institutional strategy "Modell Konstanz – Towards a Culture of Creativity"
- Zukunftskolleg

==== Clusters of Excellence as part of the Excellence Strategy ====
- Centre for the Advanced Study of Collective Behaviour
- The Politics of Inequality

== Rankings ==
University rankings

Overall – Global & National
QS World 2026	425	22
THE World 2026	251-300	28
ARWU World 2026	401-500	27-35

The University of Konstanz has been ranked in several prominent university rankings. In the 2024 QS World University Rankings, it was placed 478th globally, marking it within the top 30 in Germany. Meanwhile, the institution was ranked between 251-300 worldwide in the 2024 edition of the Times Higher Education World University Rankings, positioning it approximately within the top 25-31 universities in Germany. The ARWU for 2022 assigned the University of Konstanz to a global band of 501-600, which correspondingly falls into the 32-36 range among German higher education institutions.

The university is ranked in top 100 worldwide in the field of social policy and administration in the 2020 QS World University Rankings, and ranked 51 in Political Science according to the 2020 ShanghaiRanking.

In the "Times Higher Education 150 Under 50 University Rankings", the University of Konstanz achieved 7th position globally in 2016. This position makes Konstanz the best German university amongst those assessed, all of which are under 50 years old. This assessment was underscored by the 2014 edition of the global ranking "QS Top 50 under 50", which also concentrates on universities under the age of 50. In this case Konstanz came 21st in the global comparison.

== Regional and international collaboration ==
=== Regional collaboration ===
Experts from the University of Konstanz, in collaboration with experienced consultants from schools, universities and employment agencies, have conceptualised the two-day Entscheidungstraining BEST (career and study orientation training programme). Additionally, the University of Konstanz was also involved in the development of an orientation test by the universities in the state of Baden-Württemberg.

Through the collaboration with the HSG Konstanz handball team, the university supports elite sport activities by offering young and ambitious student-athletes exclusive scholarships.

=== International collaboration ===
The University of Konstanz maintains an extensive cooperation network with regional, national and international partner institutions from the areas of science, economics, politics and the public sector. On the regional level, the university cooperates closely with Kanton Thurgau. This allows us to offer, among others, joint study programmes with the Thurgau University of Teacher Education (PHTG). Other German-Swiss collaborations include the Biotechnology Institute Thurgau (BITg) and the Thurgau Institute of Economics (TWI). Through the Internationale Bodensee-Hochschule, the University of Konstanz is connected to 30 other universities in the tri-border area Germany – Austria – Switzerland. On the international level, the University of Konstanz cooperates with around 220 partner universities in the context of the Erasmus Programme. Furthermore, the University of Konstanz maintains connections to around 100 strategically important and select international institutions.

The university's International Office implements and promotes internationality in all areas of the university including research, teaching, study and administration. It enables and supports a wide range of international activities: from short visits by guest lecturers and doctoral students to summer schools, international workshops and start-up financing for new collaborations. Established networks between the university's organisational units make it possible to successfully address and complete tasks together.

For this reason, the International Office is not only the first stop for international and Konstanz students, but also for the university's departments. The Welcome Center, on the other hand, supports and guides all international guest researchers at all stages of their careers (doctoral students, post-docs and professors).

== The Konstanz Science Forum ==
Since 2006, the University of Konstanz has hosted the Konstanz Science Forum, which is conceived as a "platform for knowledge transfer and science communication for the University of Konstanz". The forum will serve as an interface for "economy, politics and society" and deal with topics related to research and higher education during conferences. The founding members of the forum were Gerhart von Graevenitz as rector of the university, Renate Köcher from the Institut für Demoskopie Allensbach (IfD Allensbach), the biologist and science manager Hubert Markl, the philosopher Jürgen Mittelstraß and the economist Horst Siebert. Since 2008, the forum has published a series of books to commemorate its conferences. These books address topics such as creativity, "Project Europe", networks and clusters. The most recent book (2013) on "Macht und Wissenschaft" (power and science), was published by the Universitätsverlag Konstanz (university publishing house).

== Student body ==
After a forty-year absence, the organised student body (Verfasste Studierendenschaft) was reintroduced on 13 July 2012 through the organised student body law (Verfasste Studierendenschaft-Gesetz). This allowed students to not only organise as a status group within the university, but also as an official student body or a legally binding constituent entity governed by public law (Teilkörperschaft des öffentlichen Rechts) of the University of Konstanz. The Rectorate carries out the legal supervision of this body, but not the technical supervision according to § 65b para. 6 LHG (state law on higher education). According to § 65a para. 8 LHG, the organised student body is by law a member of the student representative body of the state of Baden-Württemberg (Landesstudierendenvertretung Baden-Württemberg). By resolution of the StuPa (student parliament) and through the approval of the LEO (legislative organ) in January 2014, it also replaced the former u-AStA (university student union) in the fzs (national union of students).

=== Responsibilities ===
According to § 65 para. 2 LHG, the organised student body manages its own affairs within the framework of the legal provisions. Without infringing upon the responsibilities of the university and the Studentenwerk (state-run non-profit organisation for student services), it carries out the following tasks:

- representing the students' political, academic and multidisciplinary interests as well as their social, economic and cultural concerns into consideration,
- participation in carrying out university duties in accordance with §§ 2 to 7 (in particular: fostering and developing the sciences and the arts through research, teaching, study and continuing education in a free and democratic state dedicated to public welfare and the rule of law; supporting the social well-being of students; supporting junior researchers and artists, and supporting international cooperation, in particular European cooperation)
- supporting students' political education and fostering their civic responsibility,
- promoting equal opportunities and reducing disadvantages within the student body,
- fostering national and international student relations.

The organised student body currently offers free legal advice, a bicycle workshop and a student café. A student beer garden on the campus and a bicycle rental service are run by an independent (friends') association. Due to a lack of new agreements, traditional responsibilities that are usually carried out by student body representatives in other federal states have remained with the Studentenwerk Seezeit (Seezeit student services) in Baden-Württemberg in accordance to the LHG. This applies, in particular, to issuing the semester ticket (Studi-Ticket) and providing BAföG (German Federal Training Assistance Act) counselling.

=== Organisation ===
In accordance to article 3 § 1 of the organised student body law, which required an original vote on organisational statutes for the student body, the basic configuration of the organised student body is organised and structured on the basis of the provisions of the LHG. Additional statutes govern the particulars relating to the finances, elections, and the departmental student councils.

The organised student body's organisational structure has centralised and decentralised components. While it is its own representative body (the organised student body as such), 16 departmental student councils (Studienfachschaften) representing students from all university departments or related study programmes take on delegated responsibilities of and for the organised student body. Since the LHG binds the term Fachschaft (student council) to university institutions or faculties (§ 65a para. 4 LHG), the university chose this form of subcategorisation using a different name in order to meet the special needs of the comparatively smaller university. Since a corresponding institution does not exist for teacher education students (Lehramtsstudierende) at the university level, these students are represented by the student councils at the department to which their major study subjects are assigned to. The teacher education working group (Arbeitskreis Lehramt) and a section within the AStA (student union) support the special interests and concerns of the teacher education students.

== Well-known individuals ==
=== Honorary citizens of the University of Konstanz ===
- Gerhard Hess, Founding Rector
- Kurt Georg Kiesinger, former German Chancellor
- Horst Sund, former Rector
- Gerhart von Graevenitz, former Rector

=== Honorary senators of the University of Konstanz ===
- Herbert Beeck, businessman and CEO of the LBS (Badische Landesbausparkasse)
- Dietrich H. Boesken, German industry manager and managing partner of the Boesken GmbH
- Kurt Büttner, former chair of the Byk Gulden Lomberg (pharmaceuticals company)
- Franz Josef Dazert, former chair of the Salamander company and co-founder of the "Förderkreis Tel Aviv" (Student Exchange with the University of Konstanz)
- Theopont Diez † former president of the "Freunde der Universität Konstanz" (friends of the University of Konstanz), renamed in 1996 to "University of Konstanz Society" (Universitätsgesellschaft Konstanz – UGK)
- Horst Eickmeyer, German administrative lawyer and politician
- Joachim Fürst zu Fürstenberg † German entrepreneur
- Hans-Werner Hector, German entrepreneur and co-founder of the SAP AG software company
- Otto P. W. Hüni † Hüni & Co company
- Dieter Jahn, former chair of the University Council
- Heribert Knorr, politician
- Wilhelm Krull, secretary general of the VolkswagenStiftung (Volkswagen Foundation)
- Kurt Lion † Swiss entrepreneur, established the "Lion Foundation"
- Karl Lion, son of Kurt Lion
- Robert Maus, politician
- Dagmar Schmieder, CEO of the Kliniken Schmieder (neurological rehabilitation clinics)
- Nikolaus Schweickart, manager in the chemical industry
- Franz Steinkühler, German financial and business consultant
- Manfred Ulmer † textiles manufacturer
- Johannes Weyl † German publisher
- Brigitte Weyl, head of the "Universitätsverlag Konstanz"

=== Rectors of the University of Konstanz ===
- 1966–1972: Gerhard Hess (1907–1983)
- 1972–1974: Theopont Diez (1908–1993)
- 1974–1976: Frieder Naschold (1940–1999)
- 1976–1991: Horst Sund (* 1926)
- 1991–1996: Bernd Rüthers (* 1930)
- 1996–2000: Rudolf Cohen (* 1932)
- 2000–2009: Gerhart von Graevenitz (1944–2016)
- 2009–2018: Ulrich Rüdiger (* 1966)
- 2018–2020: Kerstin Krieglstein (* 1963)
- 2021–: Katharina Holzinger (* 1957)

=== Notable alumni ===
- Richard Arnold, German politician
- Zoran Đinđić – first democratic prime minister of Serbia
- Asha-Rose Migiro – former Tanzanian Foreign Minister and 3rd Deputy Secretary-General of the United Nations
- Annegret Mündermann - professor in regenerative medicine and biomechanics
- Theodor Sproll – Rector of the Baden-Wuerttemberg Cooperative State University Loerrach
- Ralf T. Voegele – German biologist and Dean of the Agricultural Science Faculty at the University of Hohenheim
- Axel A. Weber – former president of the Deutsche Bundesbank and Chairman, Board of Directors of UBS
- Angelika Kratzer – linguist working in the field of semantics and philosophy of language, professor at the University of Massachusetts, Amherst
- Christoph H. Borchers – proteomics and mass spectrometry researcher, professor at McGill University
- Jan Hendrick Schön – physicist who was found to have fabricated several apparent breakthroughs in the field of semiconductors while working for Bell Labs, leading to one of the largest scandals in physics history. Later had his PhD revoked by the university.
- Peter Voswinckel, German physician, medical historian and author
- Roy Yerushalmi, Israeli historian and journalist

== Awards and honours awarded by the University of Konstanz ==
- DAAD prize
- Kurt Lion Medal
- The University of Konstanz's "Stiftung Wissenschaft und Gesellschaft" Award
- LBS-Umweltpreis (environment award)
- University of Konstanz Teaching Award (LUKS)
- Nano Award of the University of Konstanz Society (UGK e.V.)
- Doctoral Research Grant of the University of Konstanz Society (UGK e.V.)
- Tina Ulmer Teaching Award of the "Stiftung Wissenschaft und Gesellschaft" (science and society foundation)
- The University Council Award
- The University of Konstanz Medal of Merit
- VEUK prize

== Points of interest ==
- Botanischer Garten der Universität Konstanz, the university's botanical garden

== See also ==
- List of colleges and universities
- Konstanz
- eDavid (robot)
- KNIME
- Classics (see Reception studies)
- German Universities Excellence Initiative
- Botanical Garden of the University of Konstanz
