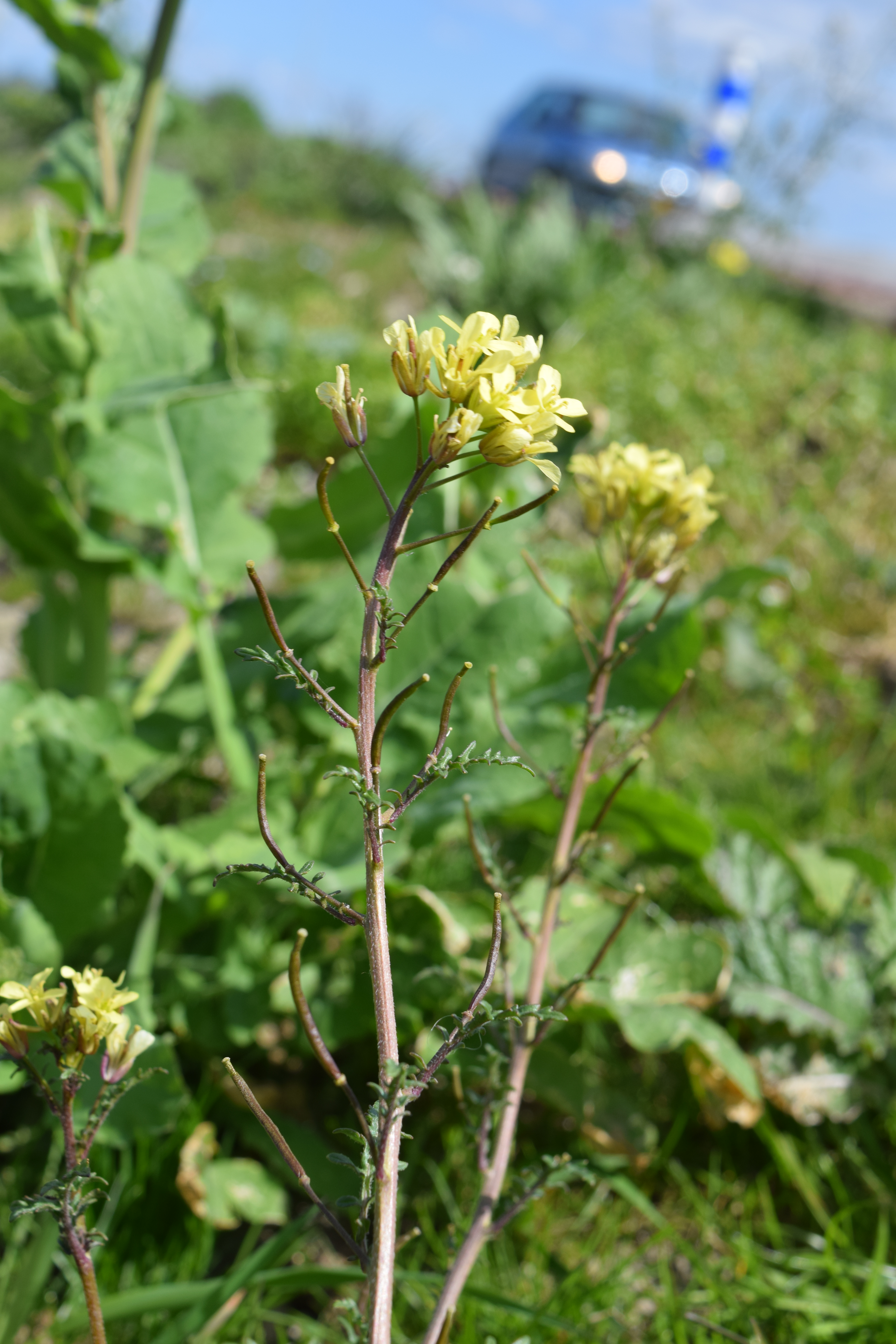

Scientific classification
- Kingdom: Plantae
- Clade: Tracheophytes
- Clade: Angiosperms
- Clade: Eudicots
- Clade: Rosids
- Order: Brassicales
- Family: Brassicaceae
- Genus: Erucastrum
- Species: E. gallicum

Binomial name
- Erucastrum gallicum (Willd.) O. E. Shulz

Synonyms
- Brassica erucastrum

= Erucastrum gallicum =

Species of flowering plant

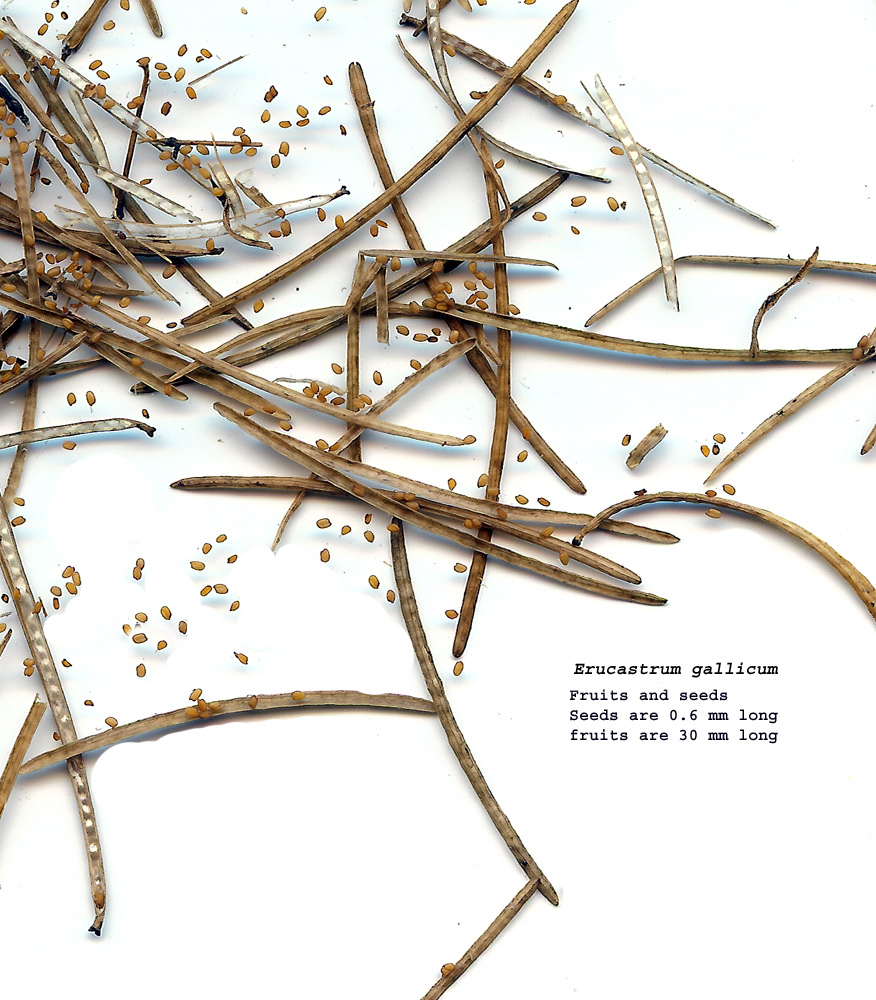
Silique fruits and seeds

Erucastrum gallicum is an annual or biennial plant in the family Brassicaceae known by the common names hairy rocket and common dogmustard. It is a low growing plant with an erect upright habit or sometimes with ascending tops with bright yellow flowers. Plants bloom in late spring through the summer into early autumn. As plants bloom the stems extend upward and when finished blooming plants are 30 to 60 centimeters long. The plant is native to Eurasia but is an introduced species in many areas of the world, including much of North America.

A population of E. gallicum was studied in a limestone quarry near Syracuse, New York between 1976 and 1981. Cohorts of seedlings germinating in the spring exhibited markedly different survivorship patterns (Types I, II, and III were all noted) based on prevailing weather conditions.
