= Erucastrum rostratum =

Conservation status
- Least Concern (IUCN 3.1)

Scientific classification
- Kingdom: Plantae
- Clade: Tracheophytes
- Clade: Angiosperms
- Clade: Eudicots
- Clade: Rosids
- Order: Brassicales
- Family: Brassicaceae
- Genus: Erucastrum
- Species: E. rostratum

Binomial name
- Erucastrum rostratum (Balf.f.) Gomez-Campo

Synonyms
- Brassica rostrata Balf.f. Hirschfeldia rostrata (Balf.f.) O.E.Schulz

Species of plant

Erucastrum rostratum is a species of flowering plant in the family Brassicaceae. It is found only on Socotra island in Yemen. Its natural habitat is rocky areas.
