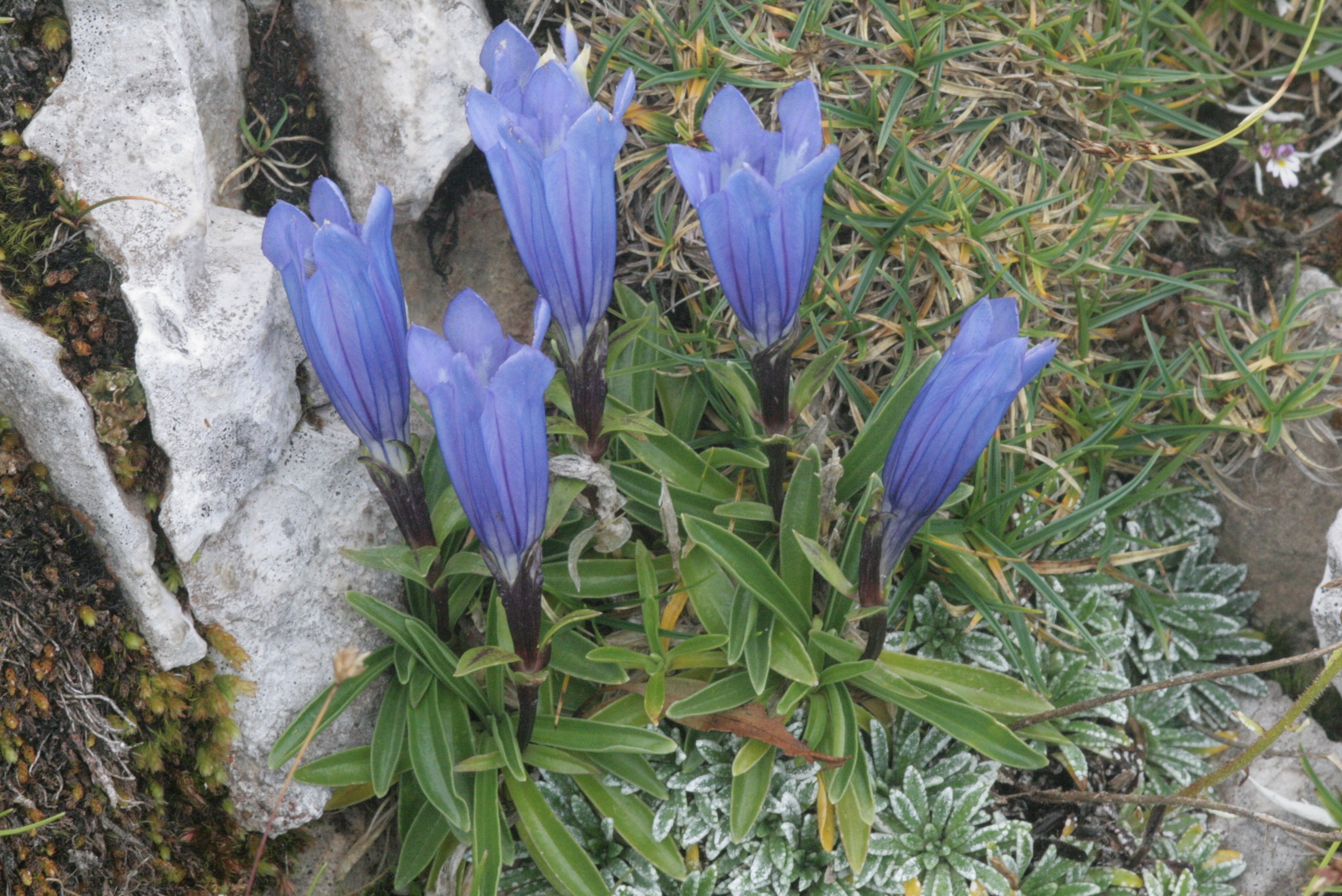

Scientific classification
- Kingdom: Plantae
- Clade: Tracheophytes
- Clade: Angiosperms
- Clade: Eudicots
- Clade: Asterids
- Order: Gentianales
- Family: Gentianaceae
- Genus: Gentiana
- Species: G. froelichii

Binomial name
- Gentiana froelichii Rchb., 1832

Subspecies
- Gentiana froelichii froelichii; Gentiana froelichii zenariae

Synonyms
- Favargera froelichii (Jan) Á.Löve & D.Löve; Gentiana carnica Welw. ex Rchb.; Gentiana hladnikiana Host ex W.D.J.Koch

= Gentiana froelichii =

Species of plant

Gentiana froelichii, commonly known as the Karawanken gentian, is an endemic hemicryptophyte and perennial plant species in the family Gentianaceae, which occurs in southeastern Alps (also called Southern Limestone Alps). It can be found in Austria and Slovenia, with a few reported occurrences happening in Italy.

== Species ==
Gentiana froelichii was described by German botanist Heinrich Gottlieb Ludwig Reichenbach in his work Fl. Germ. Excurs. from 1832. The species' name is dedicated to German doctor, entomologist and botanist Josef Aloys Frölich, who lived between 1766 and 1841, and is an author of a monograph from 1796 dealing with genus Gentiana. There are two reported plant subspecies; Gentiana froelichii subsp. froelichii and Gentiana froelichii subsp. zenariae.

== Description ==
The species appearance is similar to that of related Gentiana clusii and Gentiana frigida species. The plant reaches from 5 to 10 cm of height. Linear to oblanceolate gutter-like leaves are arranged into a rosette. There are only a few stem leaves (usually one or two pairs), which are also visibly smaller. The plant's characteristic are many non-flowering shoots growing nearby a flowering shoot.

A flowering shoot has one, or less often two, flowers. This low growing plant's petals are bright blue to violet and its corolla lobes are not spread out like in many other Gentiana species (instead they are set upright). The corolla measures from 3 to 4 cm, with a conical corolla tube. The calyx is bell-like, with long, straight, and sharpened calyx teeth. The anthers are fused together right next to the style. The plant's stigma is lobate, its lobes being linear to oblanceolate. The gentian's flowering period is between August and September.

== Conservation and distribution ==
Gentiana froelichii has not yet been studied for the IUCN Red List. It is thought the species is potentially threatened.

In Slovenia and Austria it can be found as an endemic plant in eastern Karawanks and Kamnik–Savinja Alps. Gentiana froelichii also grows elsewhere; different subspecies occurs in Italian Julian Alps and Carnic Alps. The plant grows beyond the tree line; its usual habitat consists of stony meadows and rock crevices, located in alpine zone.

== Gallery ==
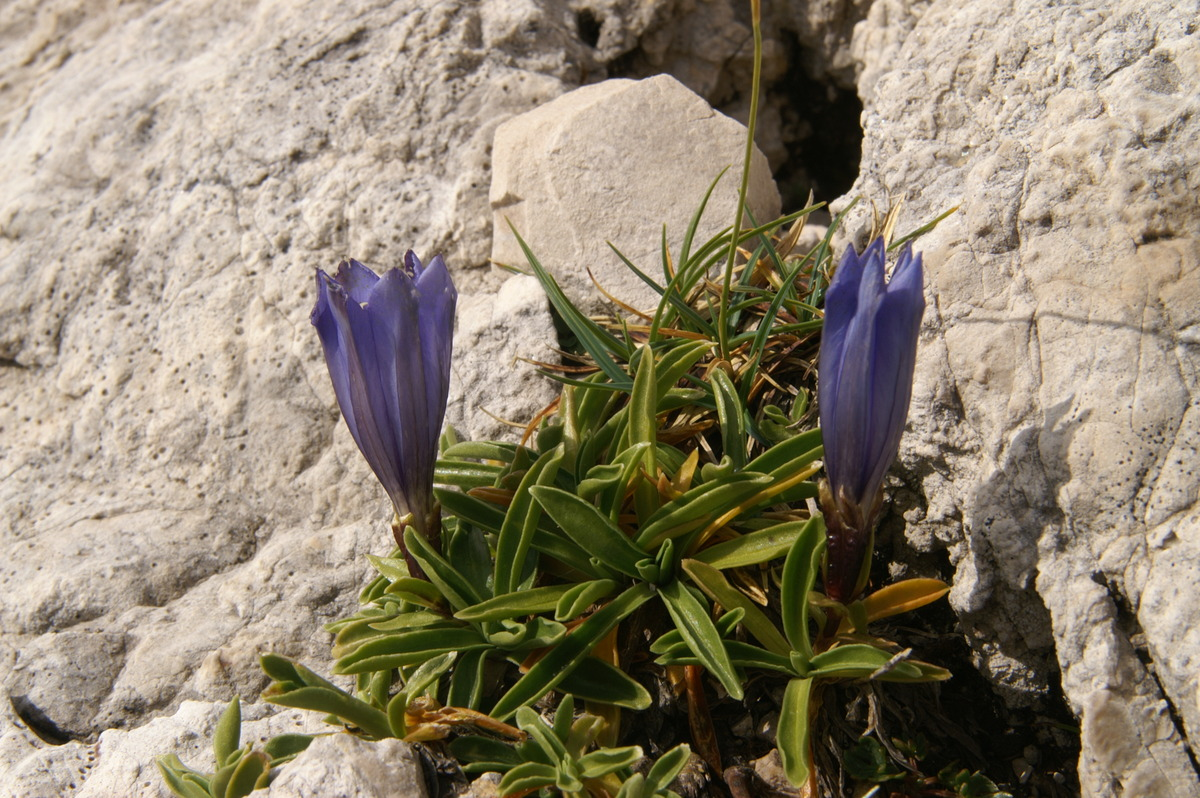

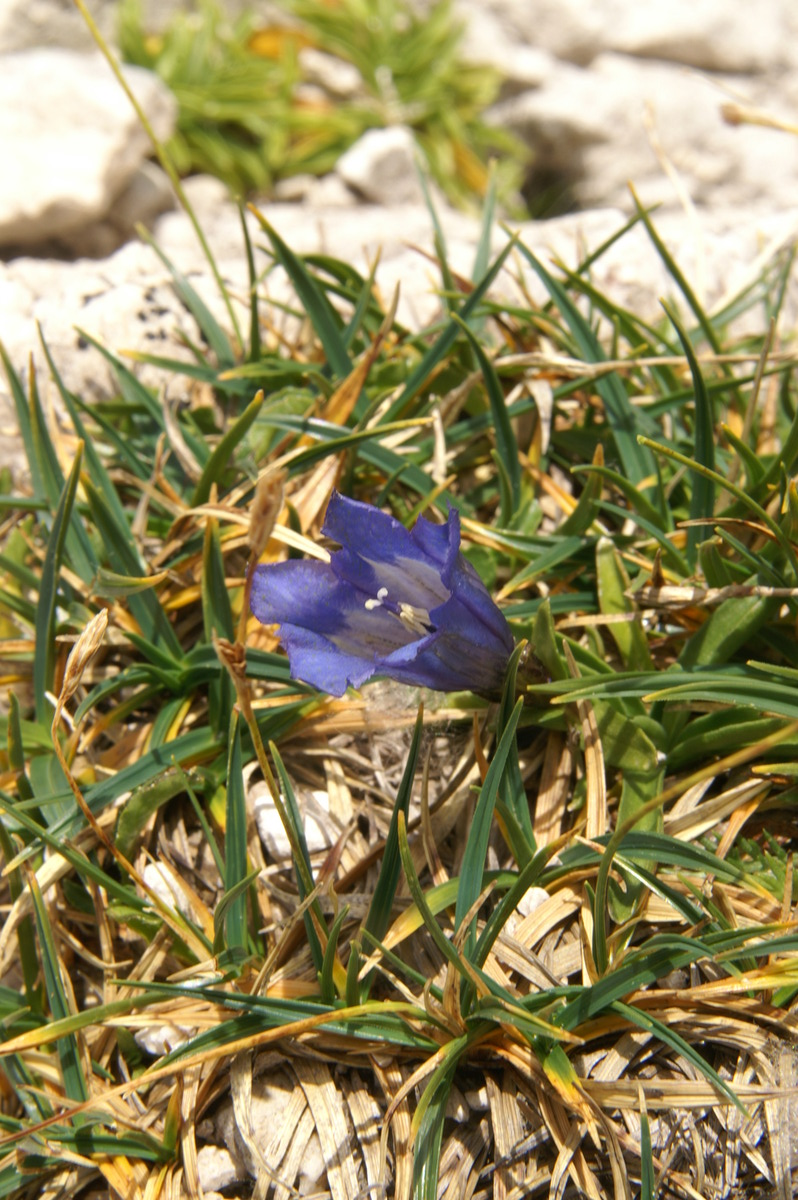

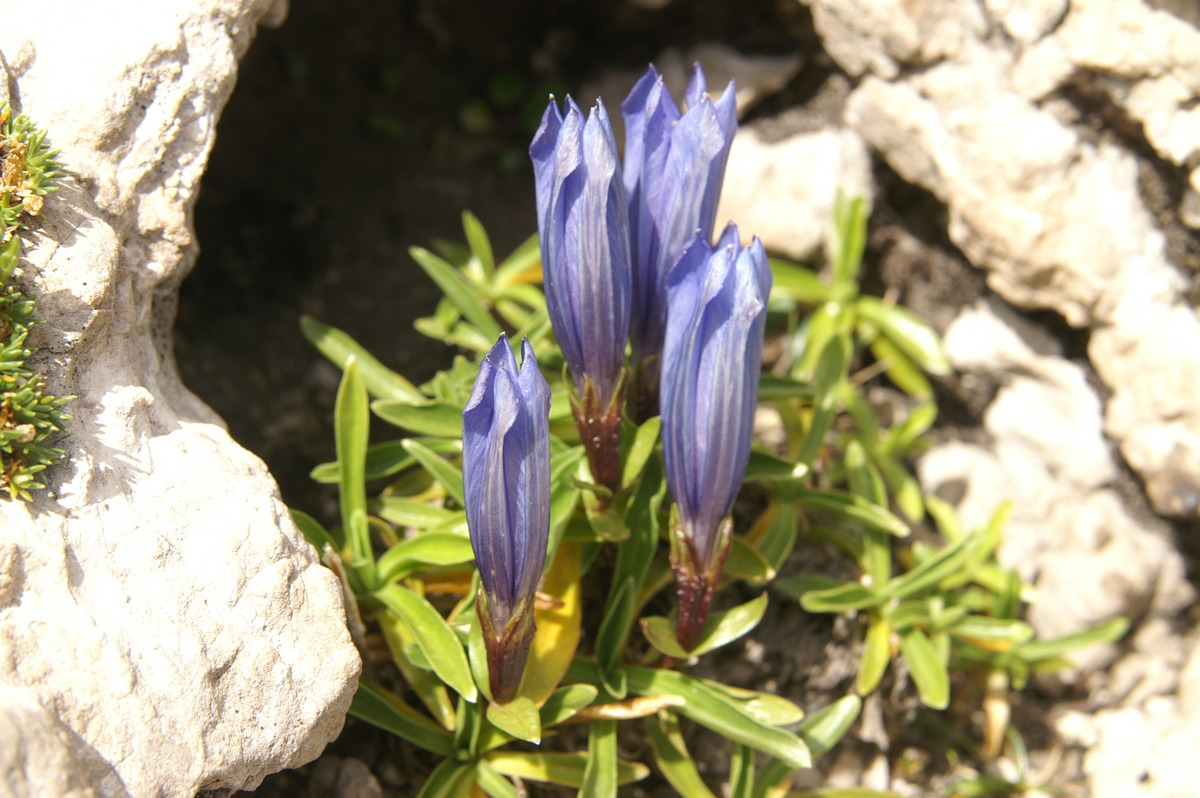

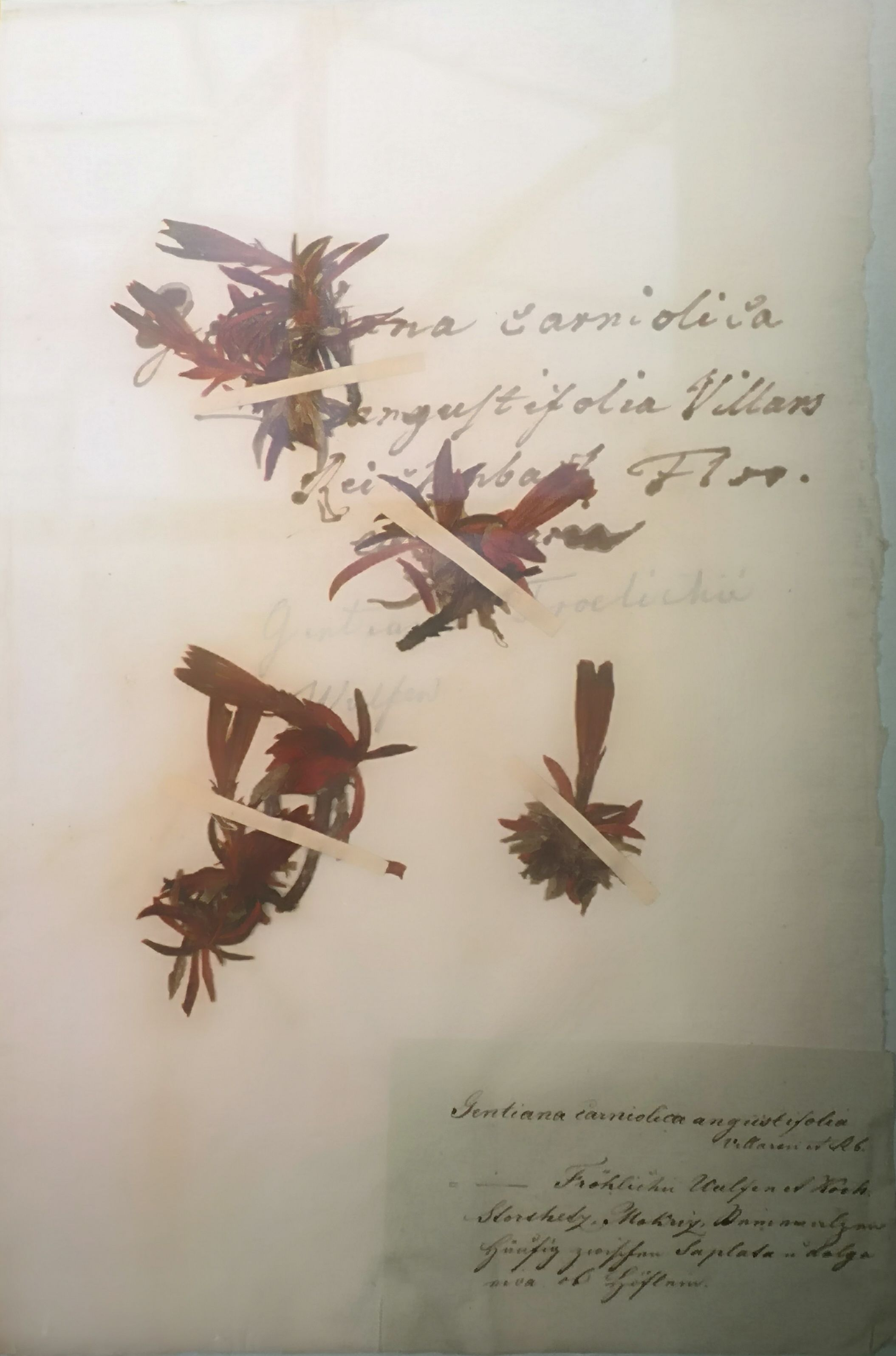

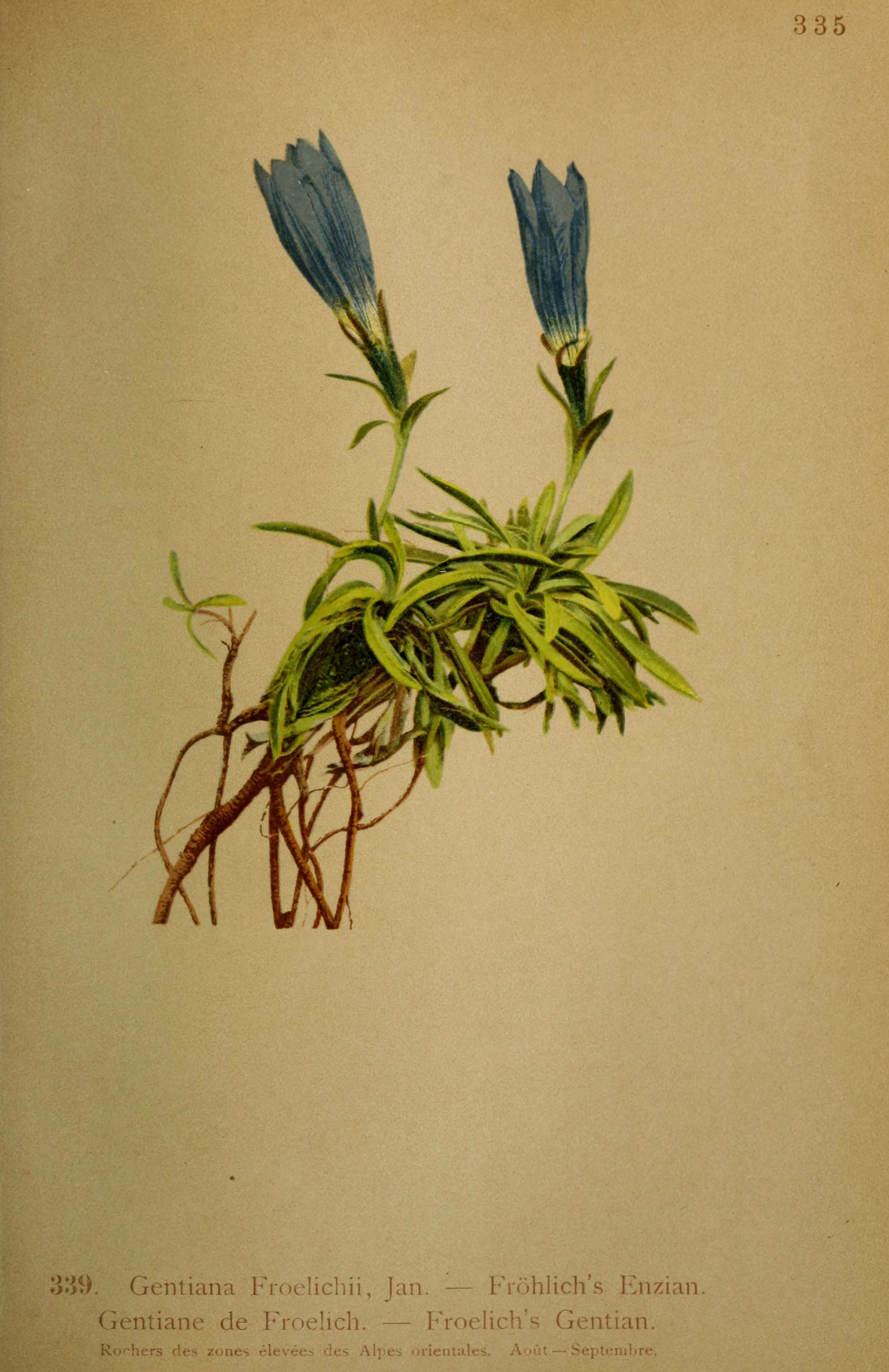

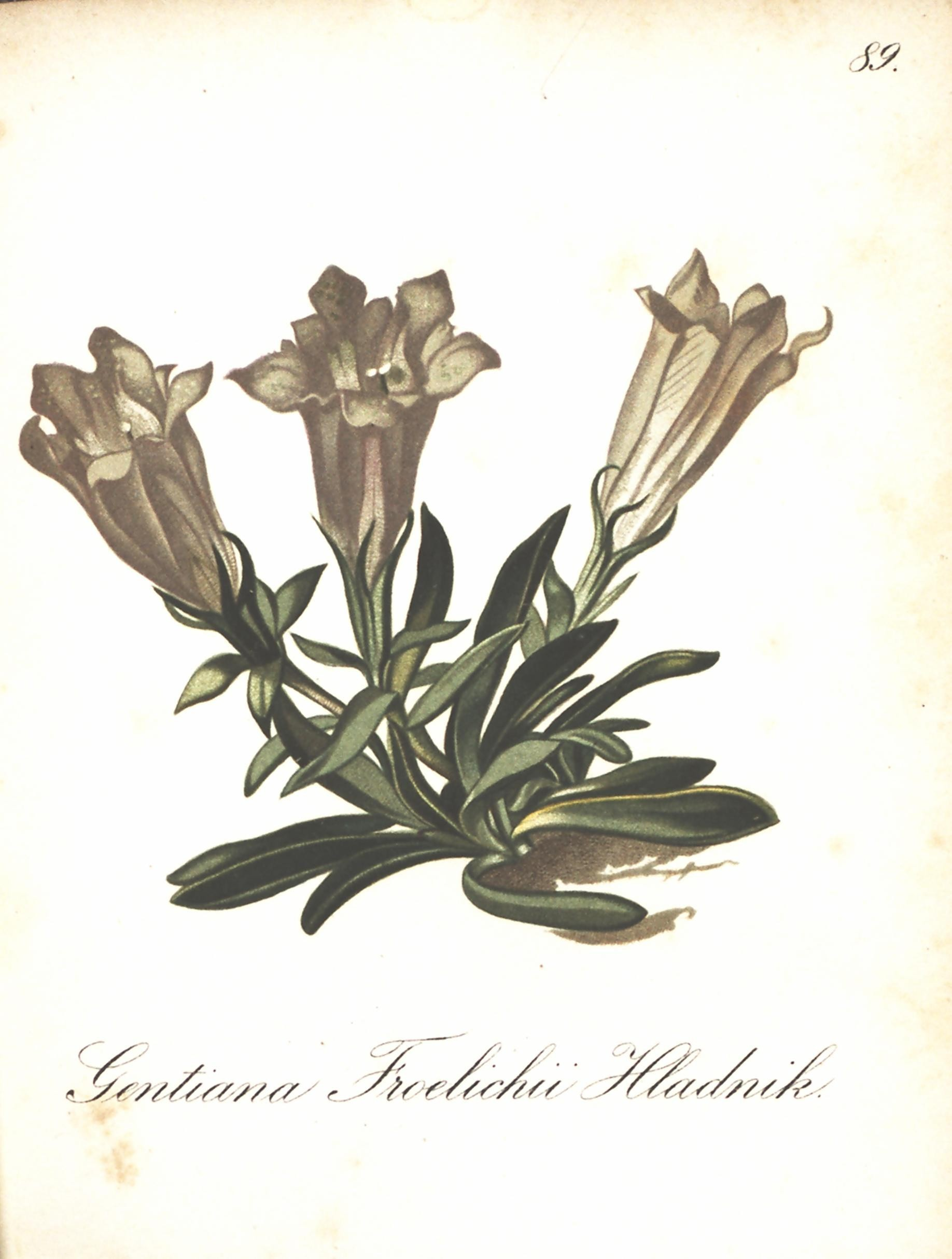

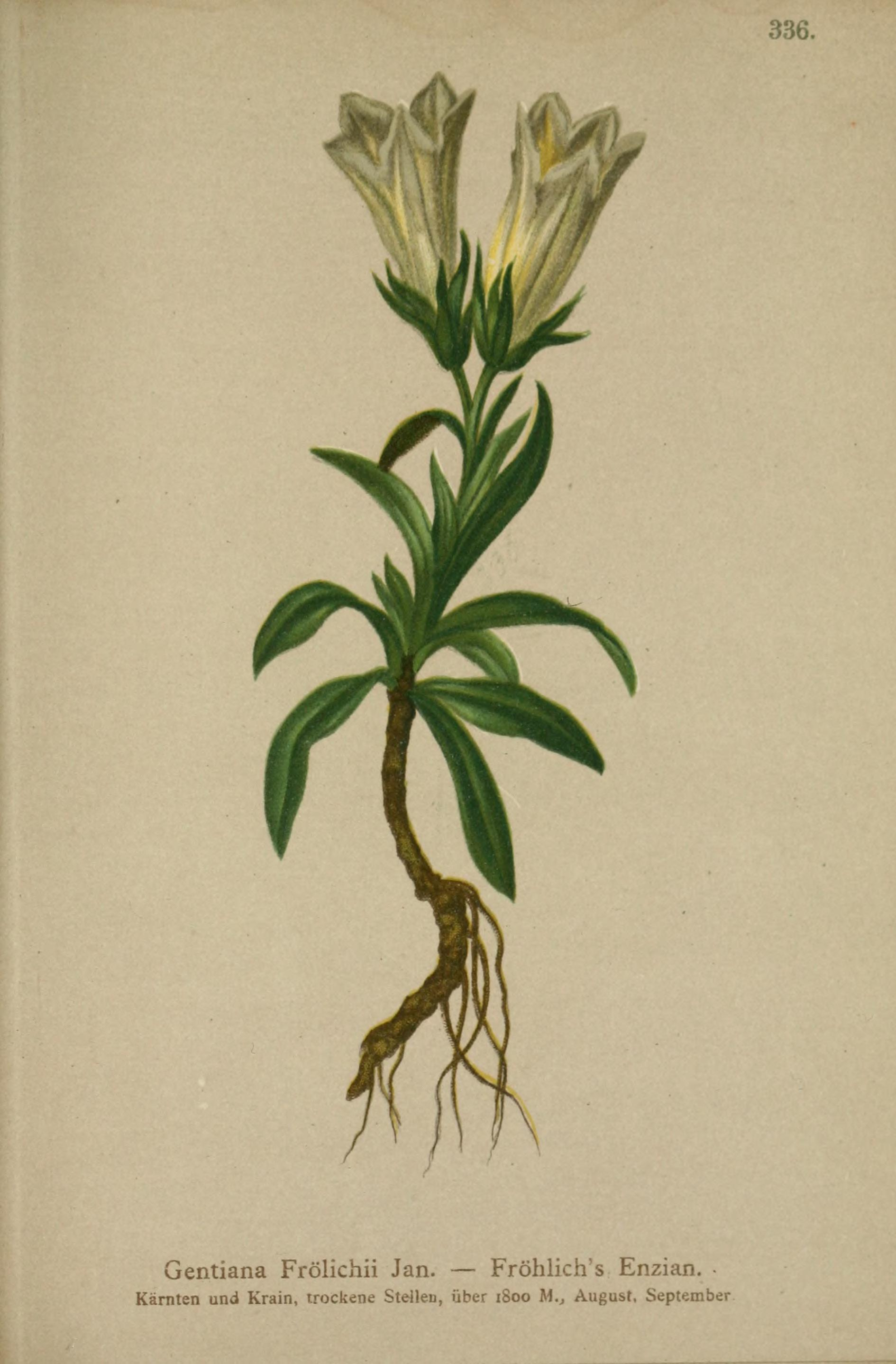

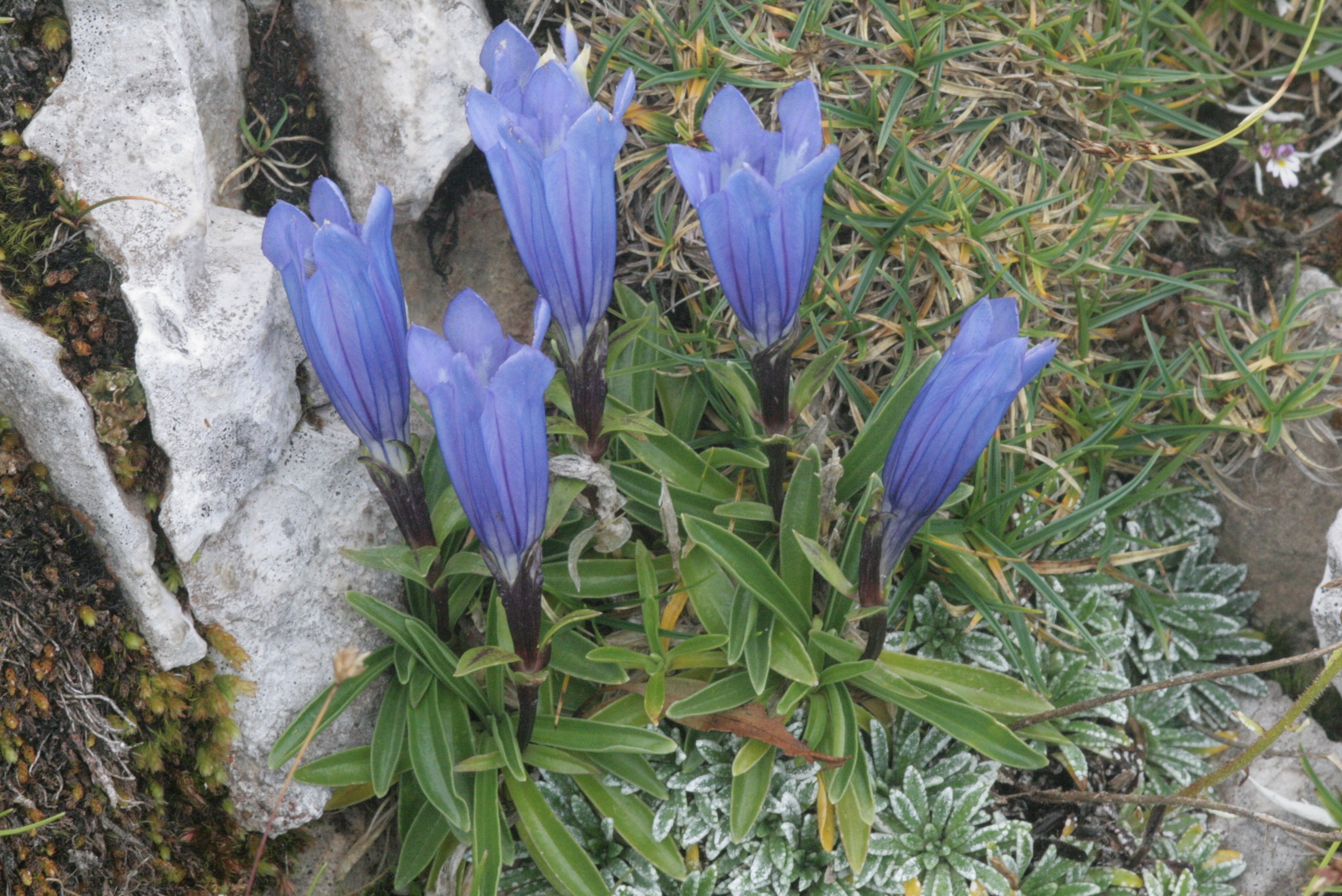
