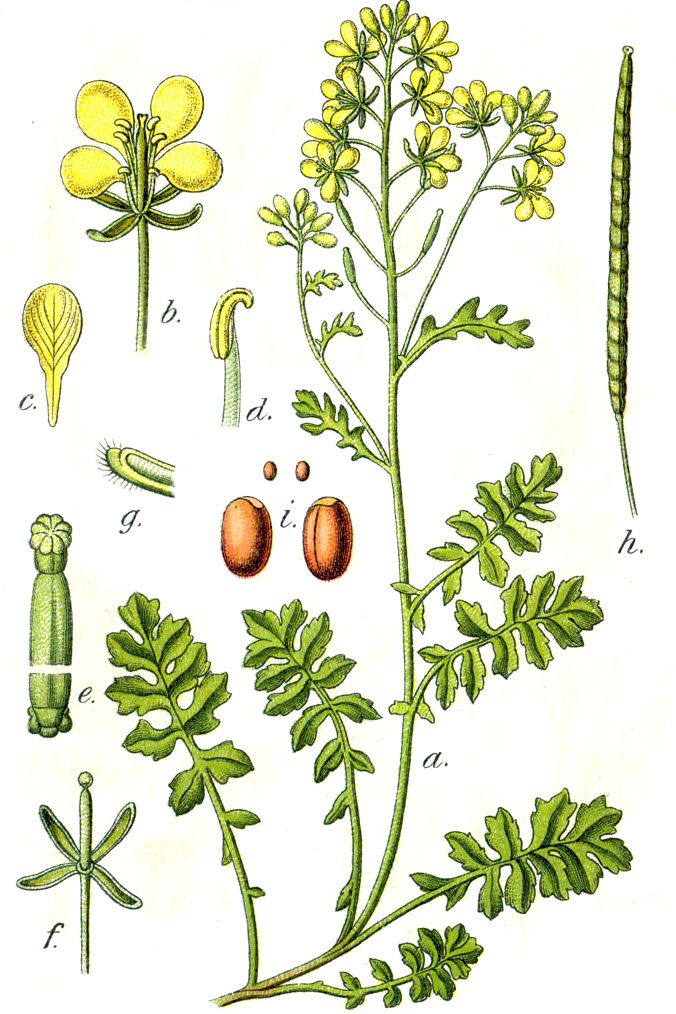
- Erucastrum gallicum

Scientific classification
- Kingdom: Plantae
- Clade: Tracheophytes
- Clade: Angiosperms
- Clade: Eudicots
- Clade: Rosids
- Order: Brassicales
- Family: Brassicaceae
- Genus: Erucastrum (DC) C.Presl

Synonyms
- Chamaeplium Wallr.; Conirostrum Dulac; Corynelobos R.Roem. ex Willk.; Kibera Adans.; Kilbera Fourr.; Plastobrassica (O.E.Schulz) Tzvelev

= Erucastrum =

Genus of flowering plants

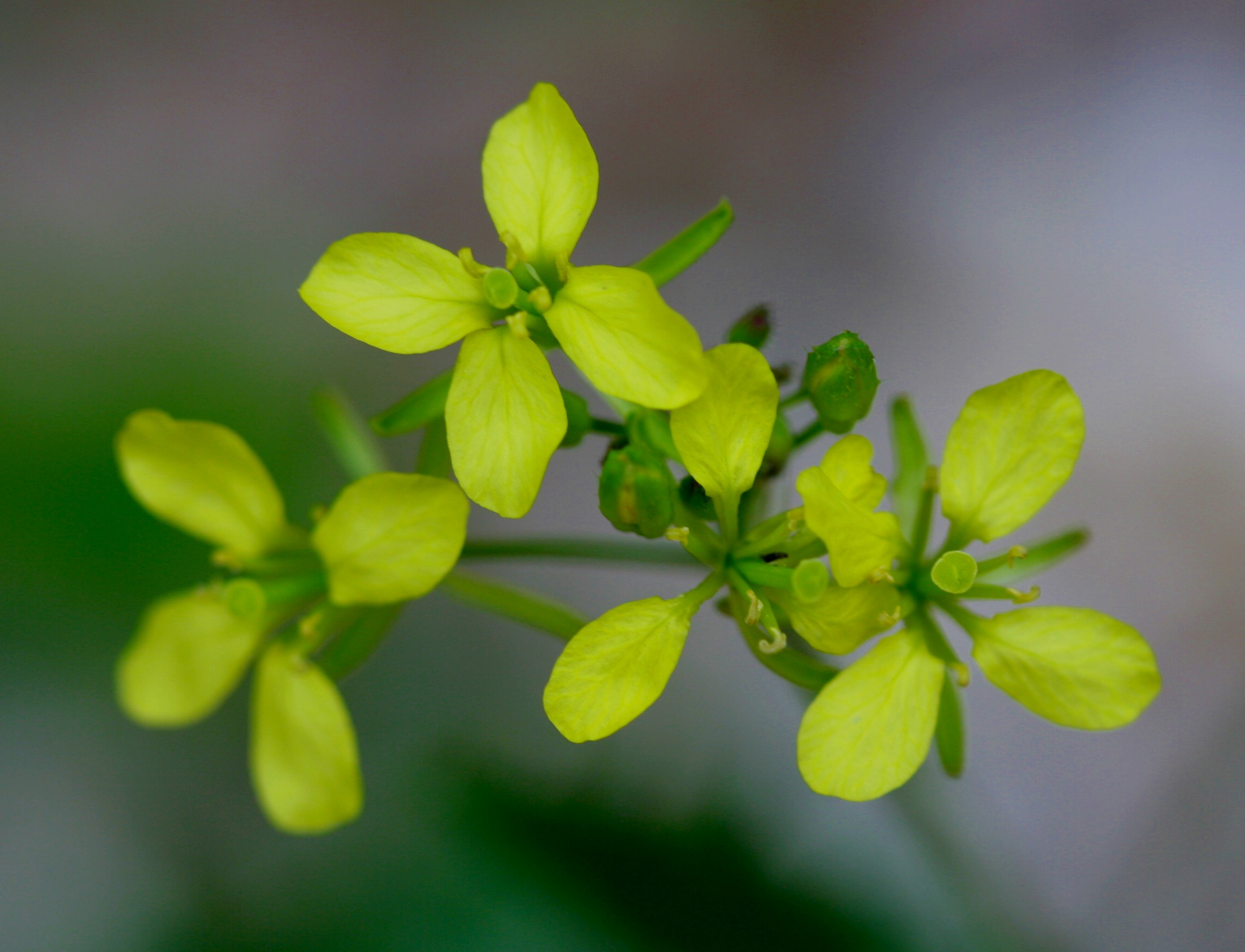
Erucastrum nastutiifolium

Erucastrum is a genus of flowering plant in the family Brassicaceae. Erucastrum species are known generally as dogmustards. The genus includes 25 species native to Europe, Africa, and the Arabian Peninsula.

== Species ==
25 species are accepted.

- Erucastrum abyssinicum (A.Rich.) O.E.Schulz
- Erucastrum arabicum Fisch. & C.A.Mey.
- Erucastrum austroafricanum Al-Shehbaz & Warwick
- Erucastrum brevirostre (Maire) Gómez-Campo
- Erucastrum canariense Webb & Berthel.
- Erucastrum cardaminoides (Webb ex Christ) O.E.Schulz
- Erucastrum elatum (Ball) O.E.Schulz
- Erucastrum elgonense Jonsell
- Erucastrum erigavicum Jonsell
- Erucastrum gallicum (Willd.) O.E.Schulz
- Erucastrum griquense (N.E.Br.) O.E.Schulz
- Erucastrum ifniense Gómez-Campo
- Erucastrum leucanthum Coss. & Durieu
- Erucastrum littoreum (Pau & Font Quer) Maire
- Erucastrum meruense Jonsell
- Erucastrum nasturtiifolium (Poir.) O.E.Schulz
- Erucastrum pachypodum (Chiov.) Jonsell
- Erucastrum palustre (Biv.) Vis.
- Erucastrum rifanum (Emb. & Maire) Gómez-Campo
- Erucastrum rostratum (Balf.f.) Gómez-Campo
- Erucastrum strigosum (Thunb.) O.E.Schulz
- Erucastrum supinum (L.) Al-Shehbaz & Warwick
- Erucastrum varium (Durieu) Durieu
- Erucastrum virgatum C.Presl
- Erucastrum woodiorum Jonsell
