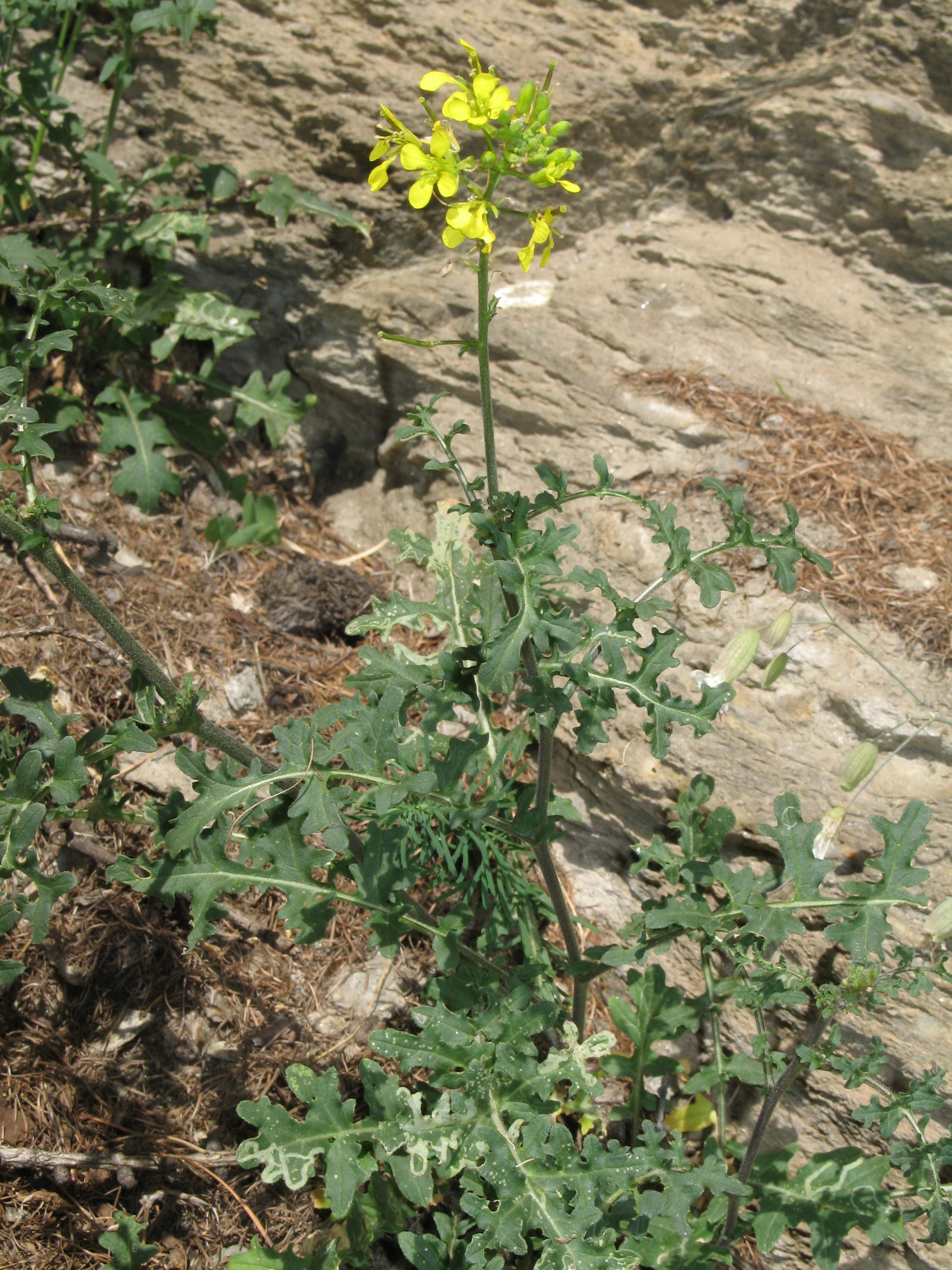

Scientific classification
- Kingdom: Plantae
- Clade: Tracheophytes
- Clade: Angiosperms
- Clade: Eudicots
- Clade: Rosids
- Order: Brassicales
- Family: Brassicaceae
- Genus: Erucastrum
- Species: E. nasturtiifolium

Binomial name
- Erucastrum nasturtiifolium (Poir.) O.E.Schulz

= Erucastrum nasturtiifolium =

Species of flowering plant

Erucastrum nasturtiifolium is a species of flowering plant belonging to the family Brassicaceae.

Its native range is Central and Southern Europe.
