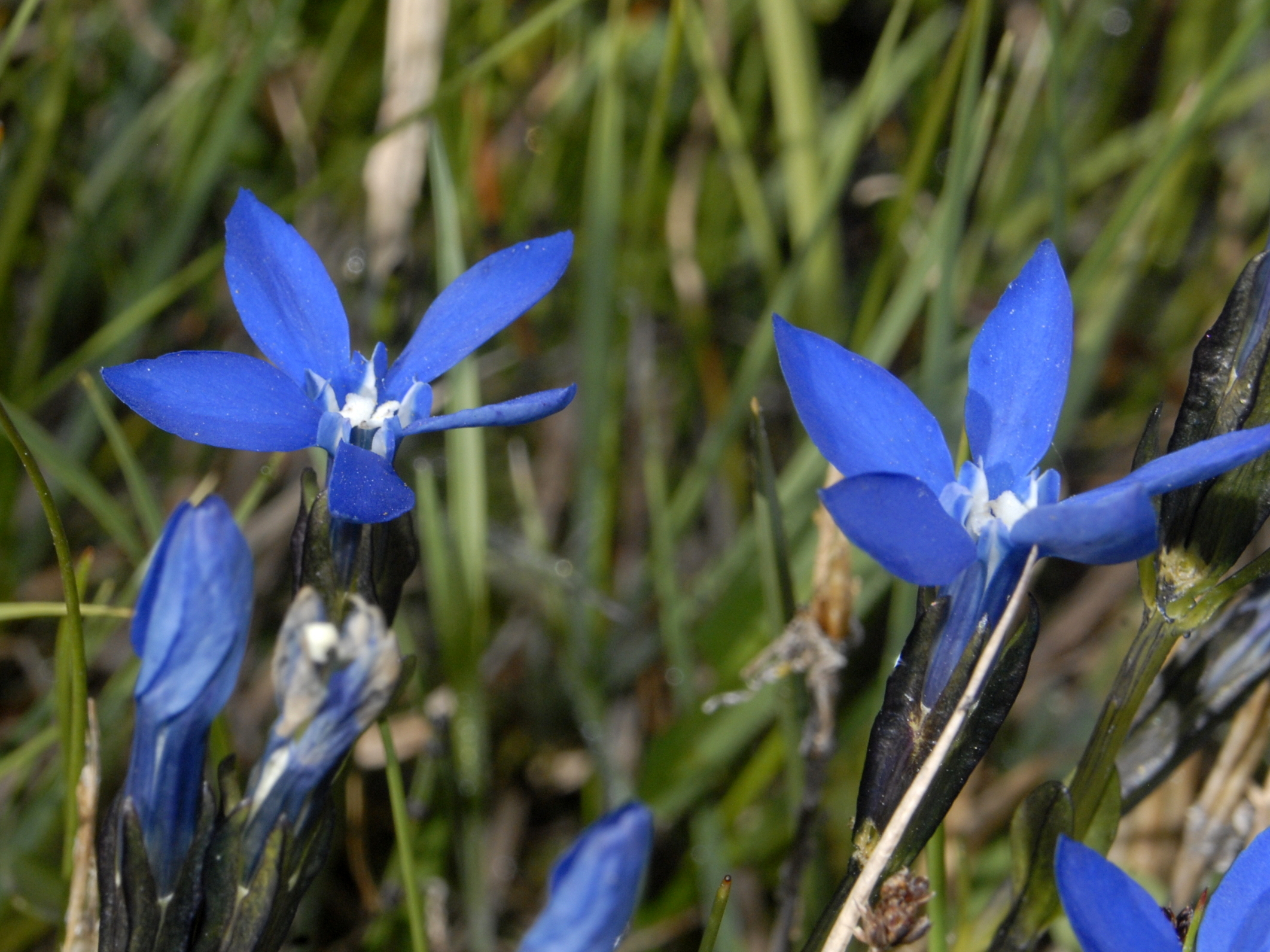
- Gentiana bavarica at the Giardino Botanico Alpino Chanousia

Scientific classification
- Kingdom: Plantae
- Clade: Tracheophytes
- Clade: Angiosperms
- Clade: Eudicots
- Clade: Asterids
- Order: Gentianales
- Family: Gentianaceae
- Genus: Gentiana
- Species: G. bavarica

Binomial name
- Gentiana bavarica L.

Synonyms
- Calathiana bavarica (L.) J. Holub; Gentiana bavarica var. bavarica; Gentiana bavarica var. subacaulis Custer; Gentiana rotundifolia Hoppe ex Griseb.; Hippion bavaricum (L.) F. W. Schmidt

= Gentiana bavarica =

Species of plant

Gentiana bavarica, the Bavarian gentian, is a herbaceous perennial species of flowering plant in the Gentian family Gentianaceae.

== Description ==
Gentiana bavarica can reach a height of 5–15 centimetres (2.0–5.9 in). This plant forms a rosette of basal obovate to spathulate yellowish-green leaves, about 1 cm long. Flowers are deep blue, 1–2 centimetres (0.39–0.79 in) long, with broad spreading lobes. They bloom from July to August.

== Distribution and habitat ==
Gentiana bavarica is native to European Alps and prefers wet grasslands at elevation of 1,300–3,600 metres (4,300–11,800 ft) above sea level.

== Culture ==
D. H. Lawrence titled one of his latest poems Bavarian Gentians. In it, he likens the flower to a "blue, forked torch" that he uses to light his descent into the underworld.
