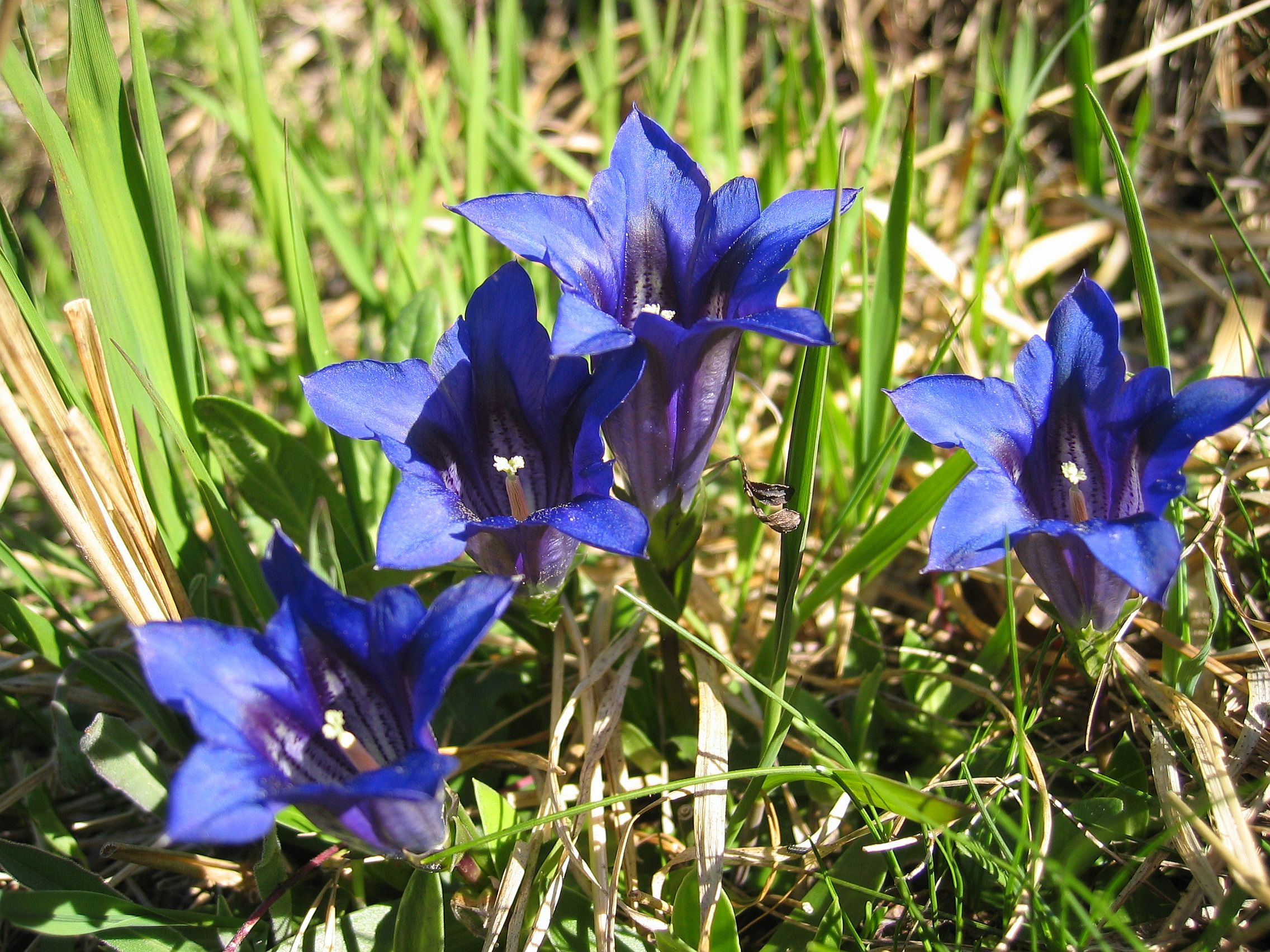

Scientific classification
- Kingdom: Plantae
- Clade: Tracheophytes
- Clade: Angiosperms
- Clade: Eudicots
- Clade: Asterids
- Order: Gentianales
- Family: Gentianaceae
- Genus: Gentiana
- Species: G. clusii

Binomial name
- Gentiana clusii E.P.Perrier & Songeon

Synonyms
- Ciminalis clusii

= Gentiana clusii =

Species of plant

Gentiana clusii, commonly known as flower of the sweet-lady or Clusius' gentian, is a large-flowered, short-stemmed gentian, native to Europe. It is named after Carolus Clusius, one of the earliest botanists to study alpine flora.

== Description ==
This species is very similar to Gentiana acaulis, but Gentiana clusii differs in the absence of green stripes inside the corolla, by a more pointed shape of the corners between the petals, and preferring areas underlaid by limestone.

== Distribution ==
In common with G. acaulis, Gentiana clusii is found in the Pyrenees, Alps, Apennine Mountains, Jura Mountains, Black Forest and the Carpathian Mountains. Seeds are available from commercial suppliers.
