= Gentiana utriculosa =

Scientific classification
- Kingdom: Plantae
- Clade: Tracheophytes
- Clade: Angiosperms
- Clade: Eudicots
- Clade: Asterids
- Order: Gentianales
- Family: Gentianaceae
- Genus: Gentiana
- Species: G. utriculosa

Binomial name
- Gentiana utriculosa L.

Species of plant

Gentiana utriculosa is a species of flowering plant belonging to the family Gentianaceae.

Its native range is Europe's mountains.
