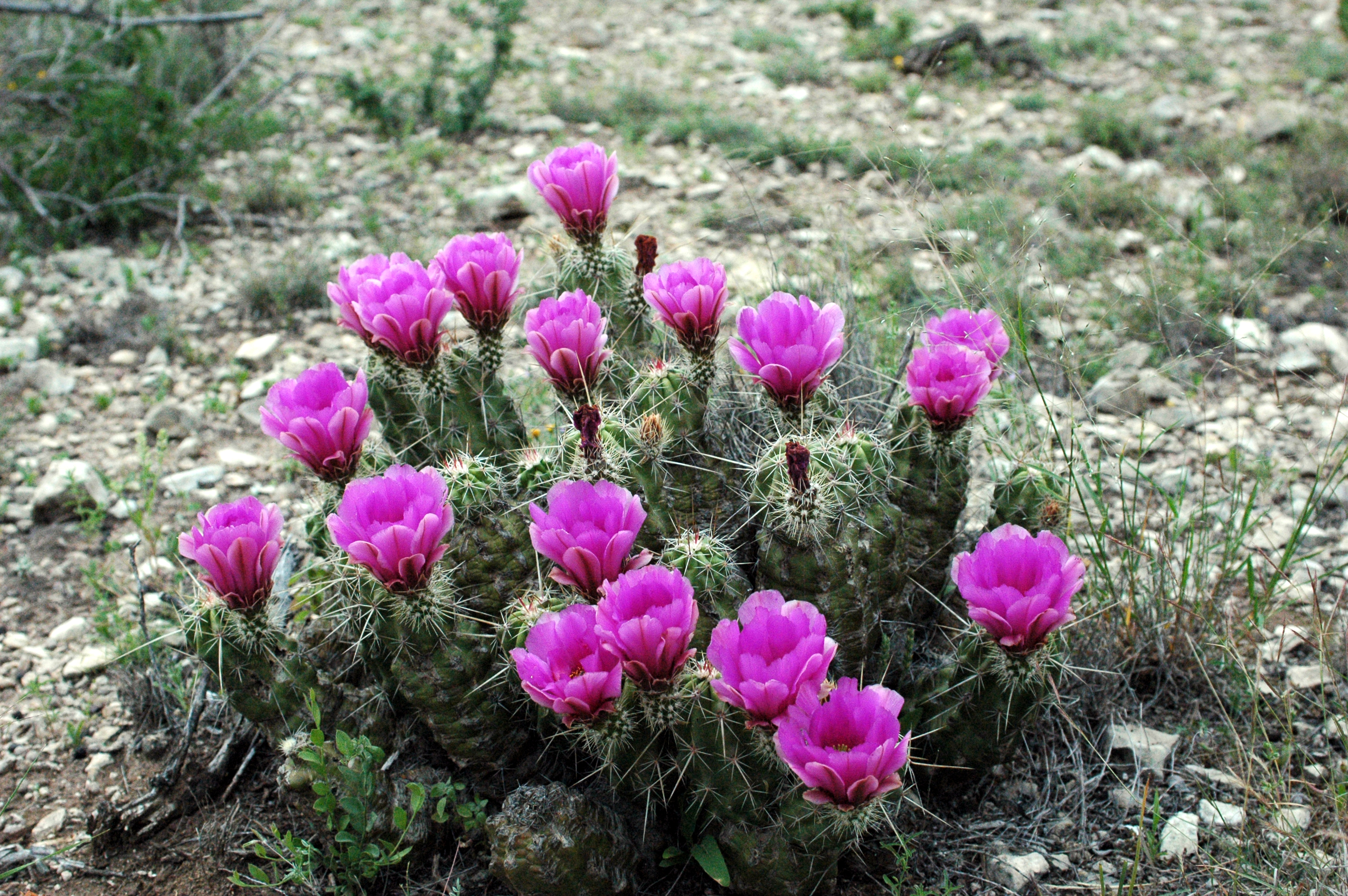

Scientific classification
- Kingdom: Plantae
- Clade: Embryophytes
- Clade: Tracheophytes
- Clade: Spermatophytes
- Clade: Angiosperms
- Clade: Eudicots
- Order: Caryophyllales
- Family: Cactaceae
- Subfamily: Cactoideae
- Genus: Echinocereus
- Species: E. enneacanthus

Binomial name
- Echinocereus enneacanthus Engelm.

Synonyms
- Cereus enneacanthus (Engelm.) Engelm.

= Echinocereus enneacanthus =

Species of plant

Echinocereus enneacanthus is a species of flowering plant first described by George Engelmann.

== Description ==
Echinocereus enneacanthus forms low cushions with 30 to 200 shoots. The cloudy to light green, cylindrical shoots, which are prostrate except for the tips, are up to two meters (6 ft 7 in) meters long and have a diameter of 3.5 to 15 cm (1.4 to 5.9 in). There are seven to ten ribs that are not clearly tuberculated. The one to four straight or curved, round to flattened, angular or furrowed central spines are yellowish to brownish or bluish. They are up to 8 cm (3.1 in) long. The six to 13 straight, whitish to brownish marginal spines are up to 4 cm (1.6 in) long.

The funnel-shaped flowers are magenta colored and have a darker throat. They appear below the shoot tips, are up to 8 cm (3.1 in) long and reach a diameter of 8 to 12 cm (3.1 to 4.7 in). The spherical to egg-shaped fruits contain pink flesh and taste like strawberries.

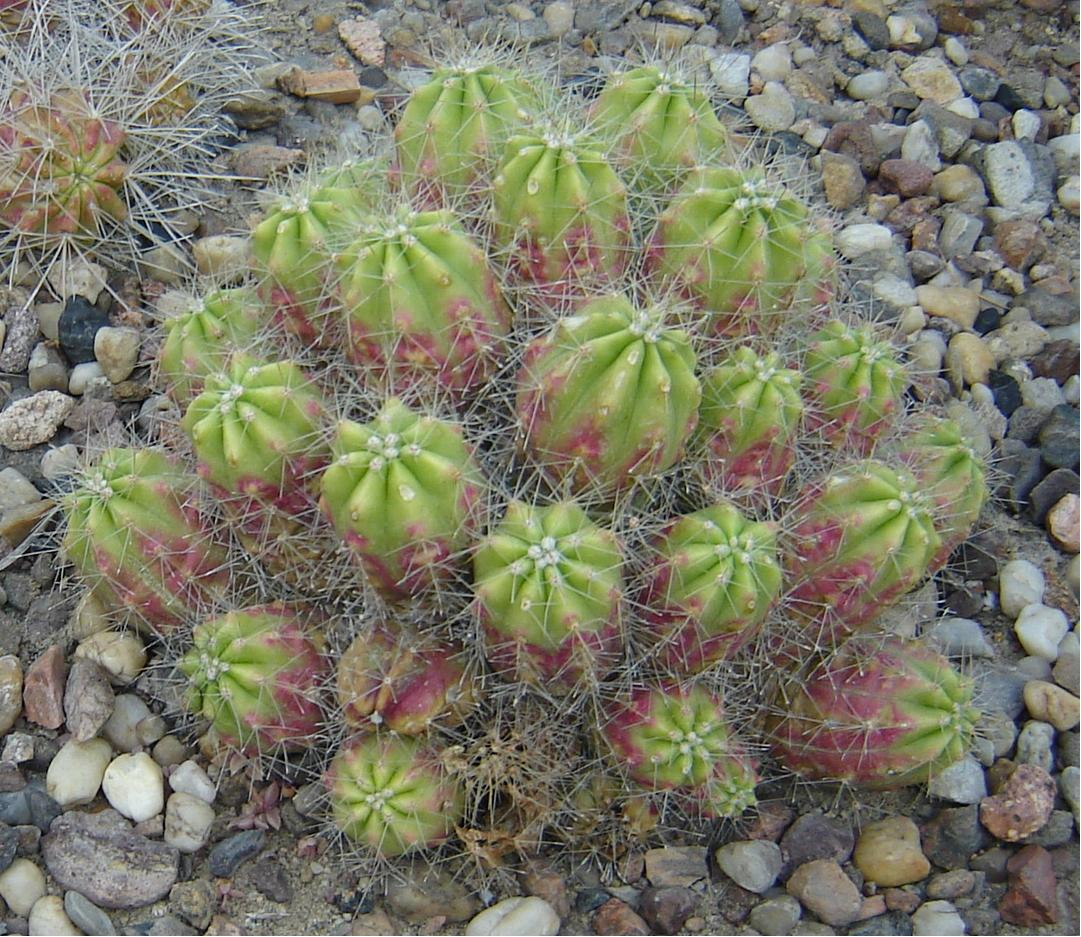
Plant

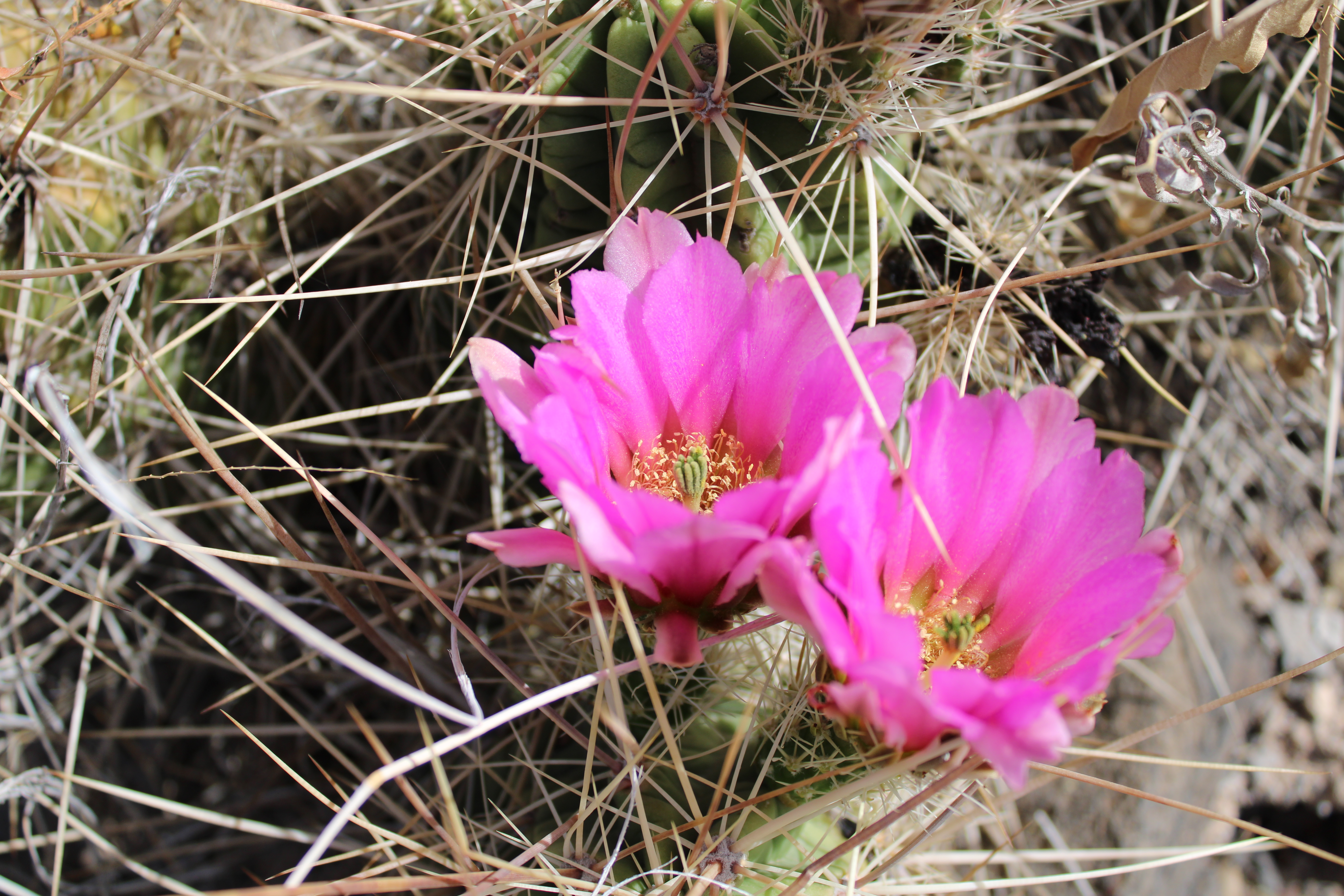
Flowers

=== Subspecies ===
This species is divided into the following subspecies:

| Image | Scientific name | Distribution |
|---|---|---|
| | Echinocereus enneacanthus var. carnosus (Rümpler) J.Neumann | Texas and Mexico |
| | Echinocereus enneacanthus var. enneacanthus | Texas and Mexico |

== Distribution ==
Echinocereus enneacanthus is distributed in the United States in the state of Texas and New Mexico is also found in northeast Mexico in the states of Sonora, Chihuahua, Durango, Nuevo León, Tamaulipas, San Luis Potosí, Coahuila and Zacatecas at elevations of 0 to 1800 meters. Plants are found growing in limestone soil in grasslands along with Echinocereus stramineus, Echinocereus chisoensis, Echinocereus dasyacanthus, Mammillaria lasiacantha, Lophophora diffusa, and Neolloydia conoidea.

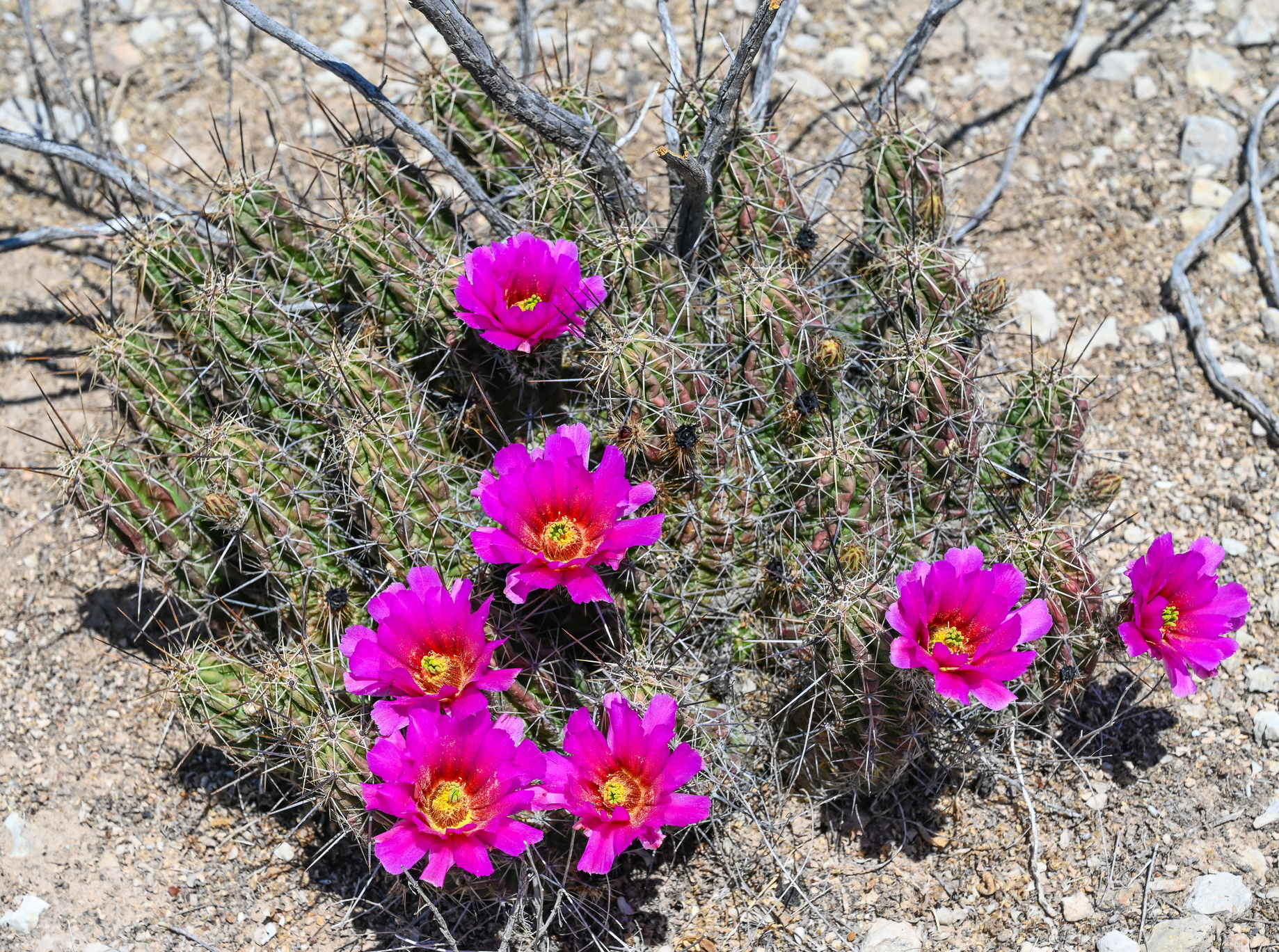
Echinocereus enneacanthus carnosus in Langtry, Texas

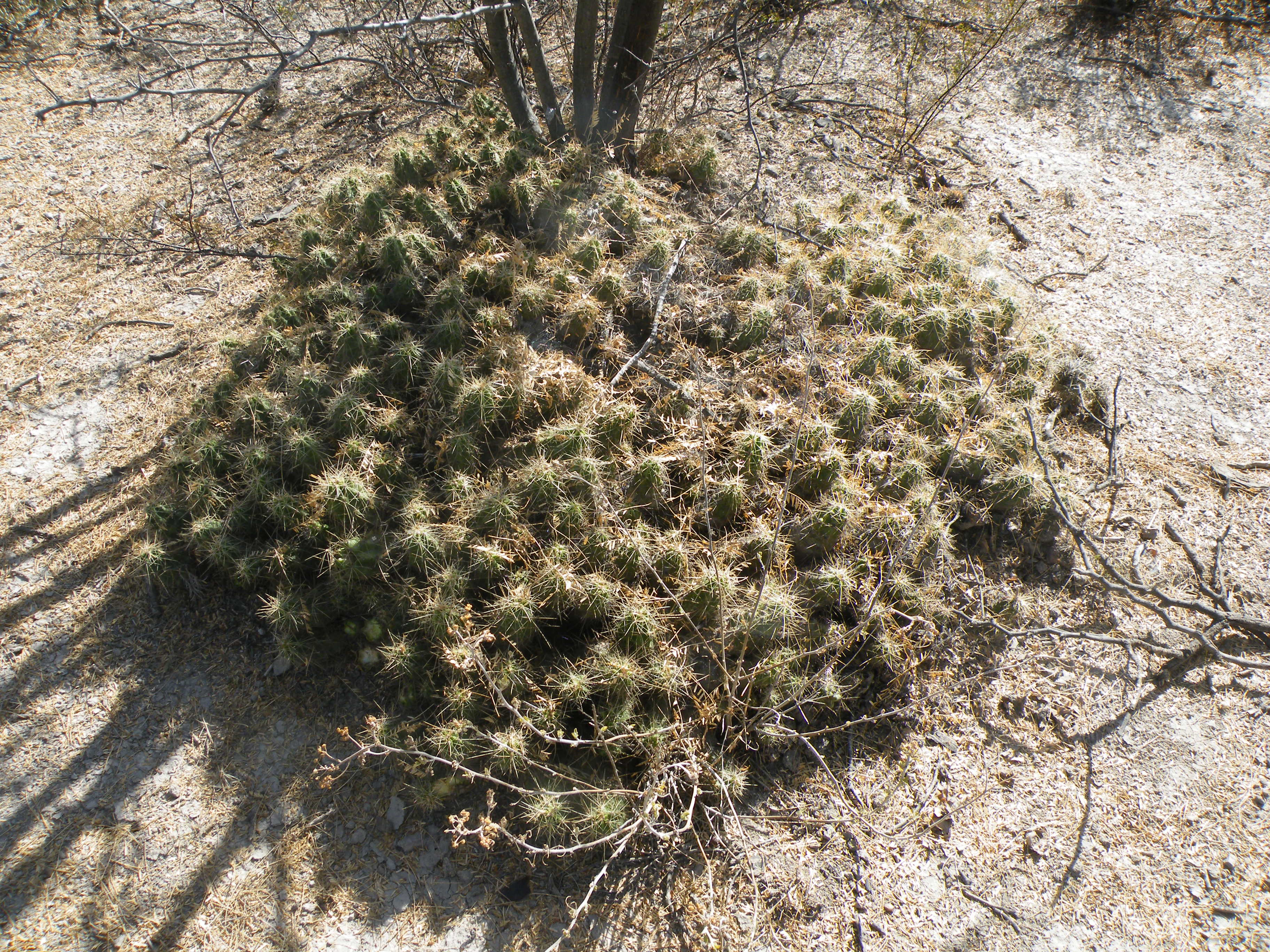
Plants growing in Villa Arista, San Luis Potosi

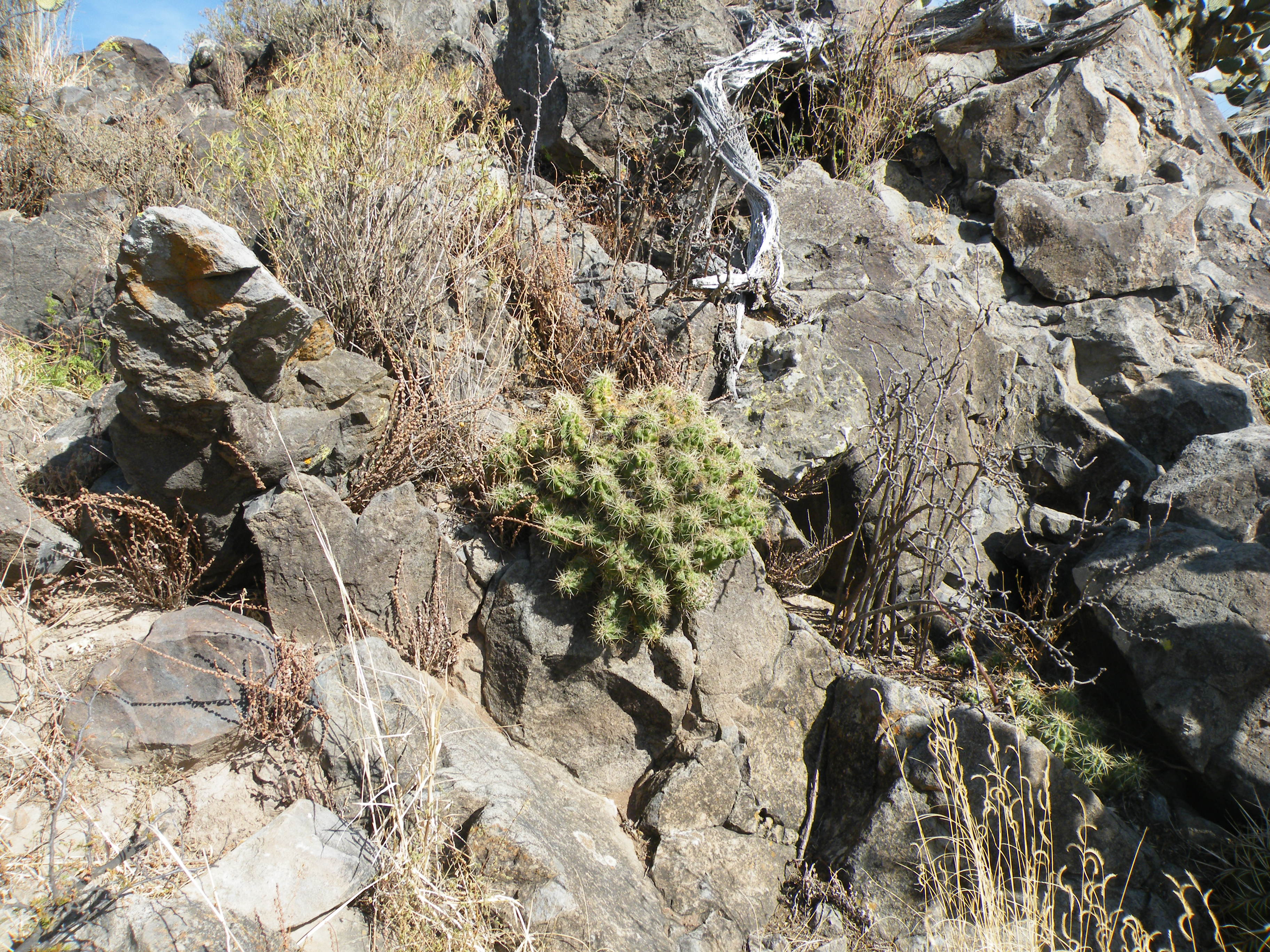
Plants growing near Estacion Vanegas

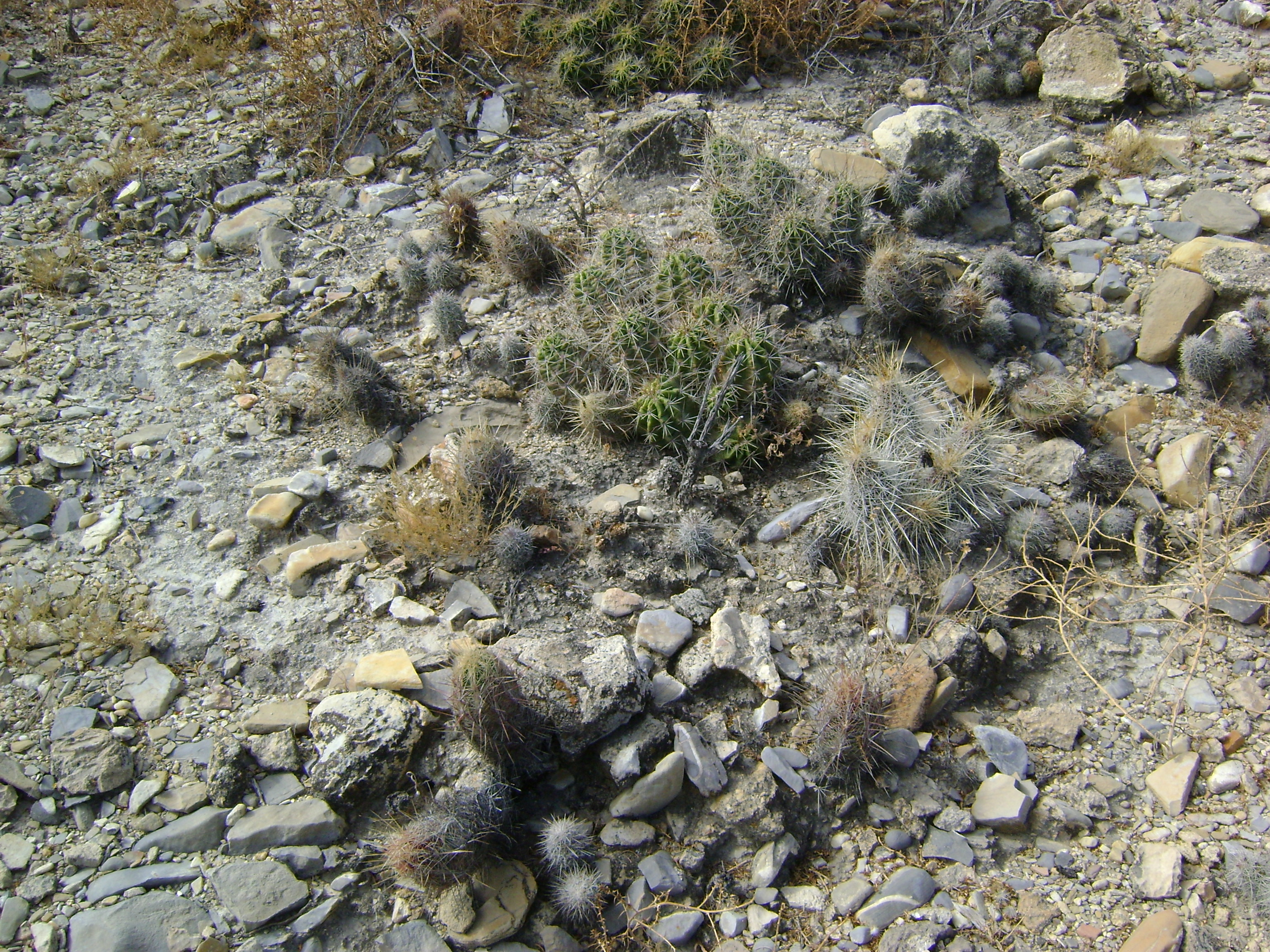
Plants growing in habitat with Neolloydia conoidea in Parras De La Fuente, Coahuila

== Taxonomy ==
The first description by George Engelmann was published in 1848. The specific epithet enneacanthus means 'nine-spined'. Common names include “alicoche,” “banana cactus,” “cob cactus,” “green strawberry hedgehog,” “pitaya,” “prostrate hedgehog cactus,” “purple pitaya,” “strawberry cactus,” and “strawberry hedgehog cactus.” A nomenclature synonym is Cereus enneacanthus (Engelm.) Engelm. (1849).
