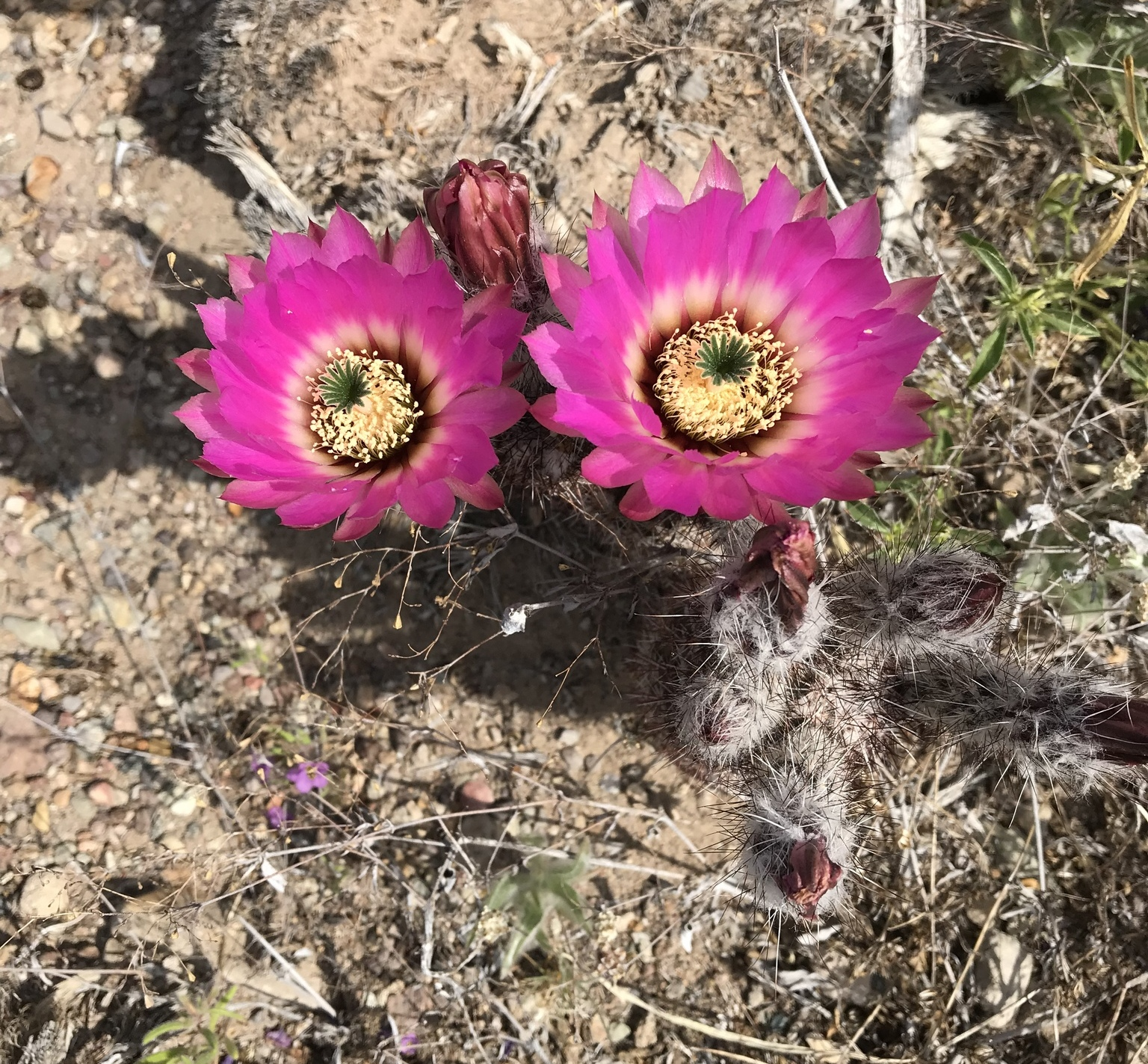
- Echinocereus chisoensis var. fobeanus

Conservation status
- Imperiled (NatureServe)

- Endangered (IUCN 3.1)

Scientific classification
- Kingdom: Plantae
- Clade: Embryophytes
- Clade: Tracheophytes
- Clade: Angiosperms
- Clade: Eudicots
- Order: Caryophyllales
- Family: Cactaceae
- Subfamily: Cactoideae
- Genus: Echinocereus
- Species: E. chisoensis

Binomial name
- Echinocereus chisoensis W.T.Marsh

Synonyms
- Echinocereus chisosensis W.T.Marsh; Echinocereus metornii G.Frank; Echinocereus fobeanus Oehme

= Echinocereus chisoensis =

Chisos Mountain hedgehog cactus

Species of cactus

Echinocereus chisoensis is a rare North American species of cactus known by the common name Chisos Mountain hedgehog cactus.

== Description ==
Echinocereus chisoensis is an inconspicuous plant, either solitary or forming small loose clumps. Stems are gray to blue-green cylindrical taper towards the tip, measuring 5 to 25 centimeters in length and 3 to 5 centimeters in diameter, sometimes erect but sometimes partially reclining on the ground. The spines do not conceal the shoots, and the roots are occasionally thickened. The plant has 10 to 16 ribs arranged in a somewhat spiral pattern, which are clearly tuberculated, with noticeably woolly areoles. The 1 to 6 slender, brownish central spines are up to 1.7 centimeters long, with the lowest being the longest. The 11 to 16 whitish to grayish radial spines are 1.2 to 2 centimeters long, with the top ones being very short and the bottom ones the longest. Flowers can be up to 6 to 9.5 centimeters long and 5 to 12 centimeters long, whitish along the throat, with red or purple spots near the base, and light pink-magenta near the tips. Anthers are yellow, fruit green. The club-shaped, reddish, woolly, and bristly fruits are up to 3.5 centimeters long and tear open when ripe.

=== Varieties ===
There are two varieties of this species, both rare.

Image	Scientific name	Description	Distribution
	Echinocereus chisoensis var. fobeanus (Oehme) N.P.Taylor	This variety is sometimes regarded as a distinct species, Echinocereus fobeanus.	known only from south of the Río Grande, between Coahuila and Durango in Mexico.
	Echinocereus chisoensis var. chisoensis	It is a federally listed threatened species of the United States. Other plants in the area include creosote (Larrea tridentata) and lechuguilla (Agave lechuguilla). Creosote and similar shrubs act as nurse plants for the cactus. The "incredibly spectacular" pink flowers of this plant have made it a target for cactus collectors, who are a major threat to the survival of the species. There are only about 1000 individuals existing.	known only from alluvial flats in desert scrub habitat. The soil is rocky and gravelly. It is endemic to Brewster County, Texas, with all occurrences located within Big Bend National Park.

== Distribution ==
The plant is native to the Chihuahuan Desert of northern Mexico in the states of Coahuila, Chihuahua, and Durango and in Brewster County, Texas, United States below 1000 meters. Plants are found growing in desert grasslands or open xerophyllous shrublands in limestone flats and soil.

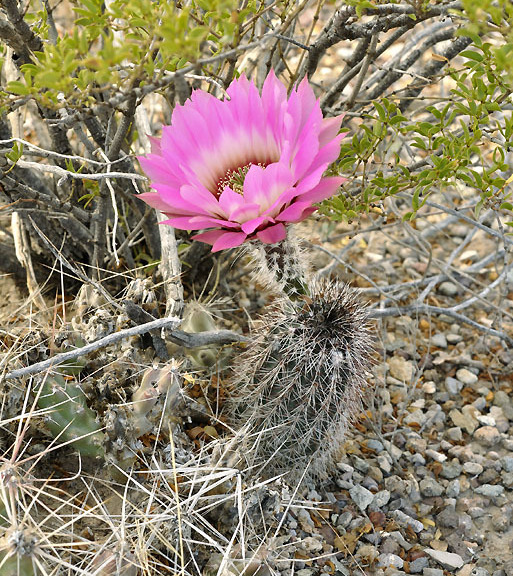
Plant blooming near Woodsons, Texas

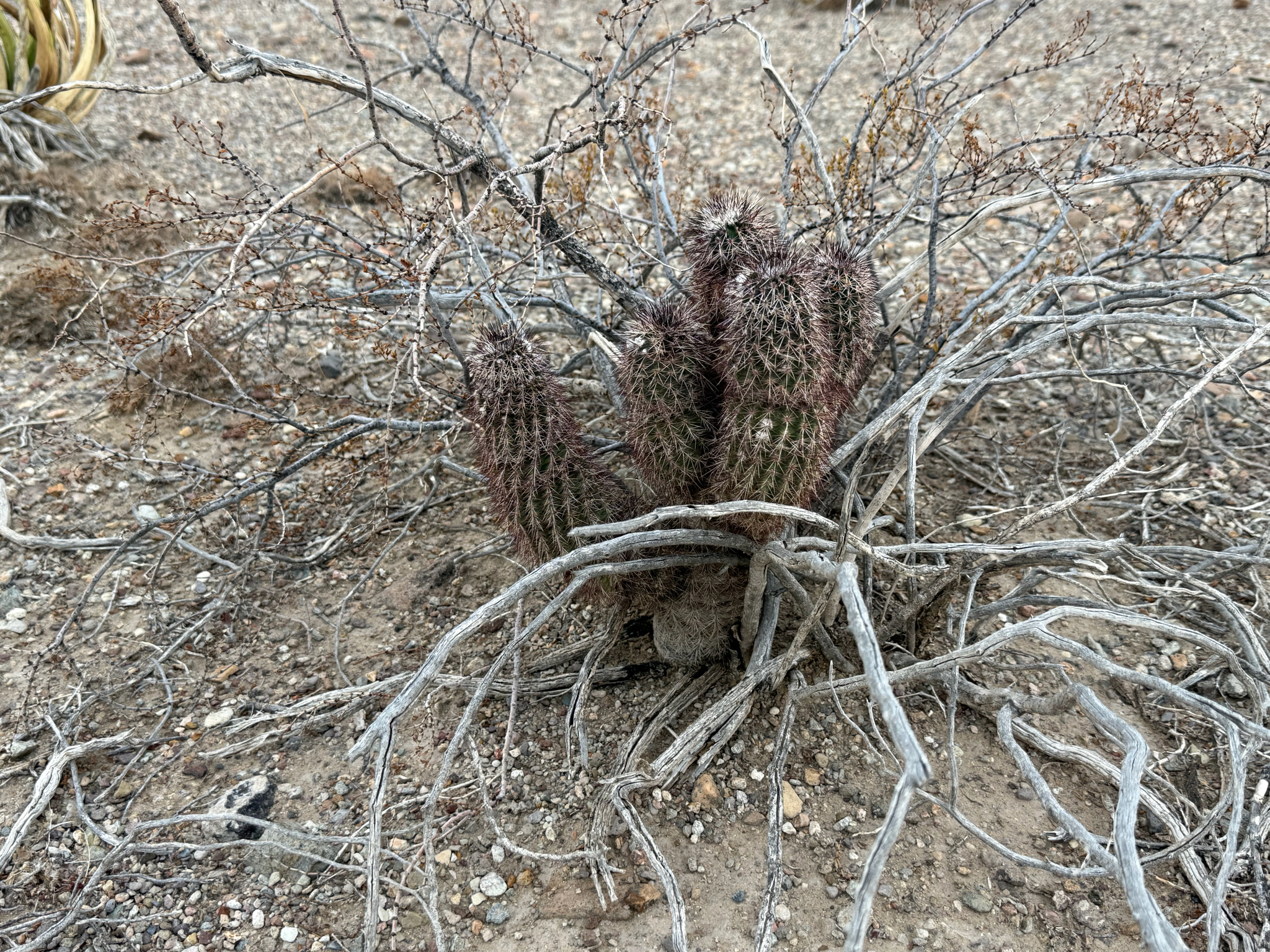
Plant growing in Brewster County, Texas

== Pollination ==
Because it is self-incompatible, flowers of one cactus require pollen from another individual of the species for fertilization; when plants are rare and spread apart, the likelihood that a pollinator will stop at the plant and deliver the correct pollen is lower. When fruits are successfully produced, they are often taken by jackrabbits and rodents for food. Dry conditions may increase this herbivory and decrease pollinator abundance.

== Taxonomy ==
The species was first described by William Taylor Marshall in 1940. The specific epithet "chisoensis" refers to its occurrence in the Chisos Mountains in Big Bend National Park.

== See also ==
- Cryptantha crassipes
- Escobaria minima
- Flora of the Chihuahuan Desert
