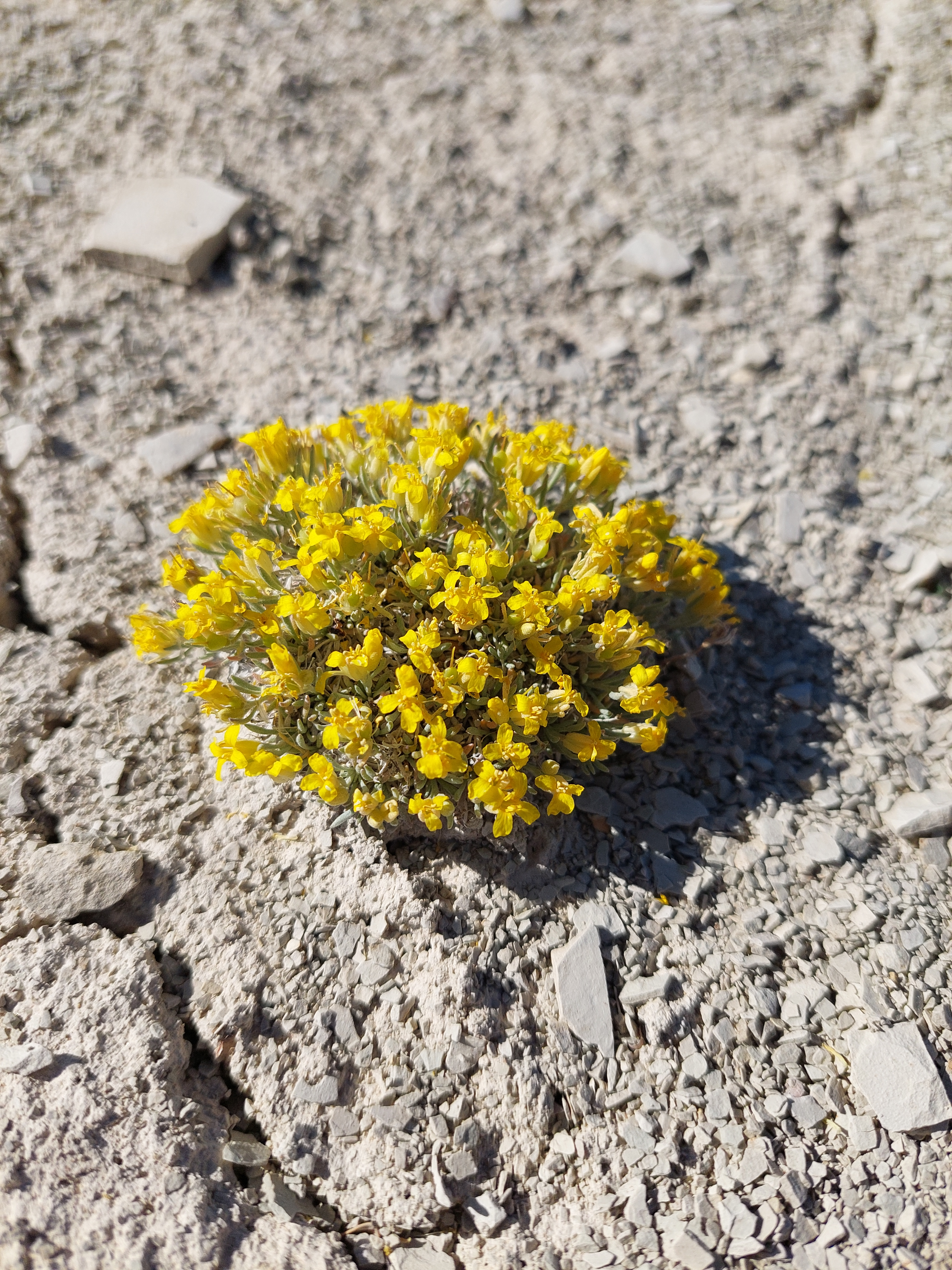

Conservation status
- Critically Imperiled (NatureServe)

Scientific classification
- Kingdom: Plantae
- Clade: Tracheophytes
- Clade: Angiosperms
- Clade: Eudicots
- Clade: Rosids
- Order: Brassicales
- Family: Brassicaceae
- Genus: Physaria
- Species: P. tumulosa

Binomial name
- Physaria tumulosa (Barneby) O'Kane & Al-Shehbaz

Synonyms
- Lesquerella tumulosa Physaria hitchcockii subsp. tumulosa

= Physaria tumulosa =

Species of flowering plant

Physaria tumulosa, known by the common name Kodachrome bladderpod, is a rare species of flowering plant in the family Brassicaceae. It is endemic to Utah in the United States, where it is known only from Kane County. There is only one known population of this plant, made up of scattered occurrences totaling about 20,000 individuals, all within the Kodachrome Basin. The plant is threatened by the loss and degradation of its habitat. It is federally listed as an endangered species. It was previously treated as a subspecies of Physaria hitchcockii.

P. tumulosa is a perennial herb producing short stems from a buried caudex and forming a tough mat just a few centimeters tall and a few centimeters in diameter. The mat has hairy, somewhat fleshy leaves which are linear or lance-shaped and up to 1.2 centimeters long. The inflorescence is a crowded raceme of bright yellow flowers. The fruit is an inflated silique a few millimeters wide.

The single known population of this plant is mostly located on land within the bounds of the Grand Staircase–Escalante National Monument and Kodachrome Basin State Park. It grows on dry, barren outcrops of white shale at roughly 1,740 meters (5,710 feet) in elevation. The rock is part of the Carmel geologic formation. The plant is commonly associated with buckbrush (Purshia tridentata) and yellow cryptantha (Cryptantha flava), but it generally grows on bare rocky substrate with little other vegetation. P. tumulosa is a narrow endemic which is extremely limited in distribution, and the land on which it grows is impacted by a number of processes. The main threat to the species is off-road vehicle use. The vehicles cause soil degradation, erosion, and plant mortality. Gravel mining was once a threat to the species but since the area was designated a national monument these operations have ceased.
