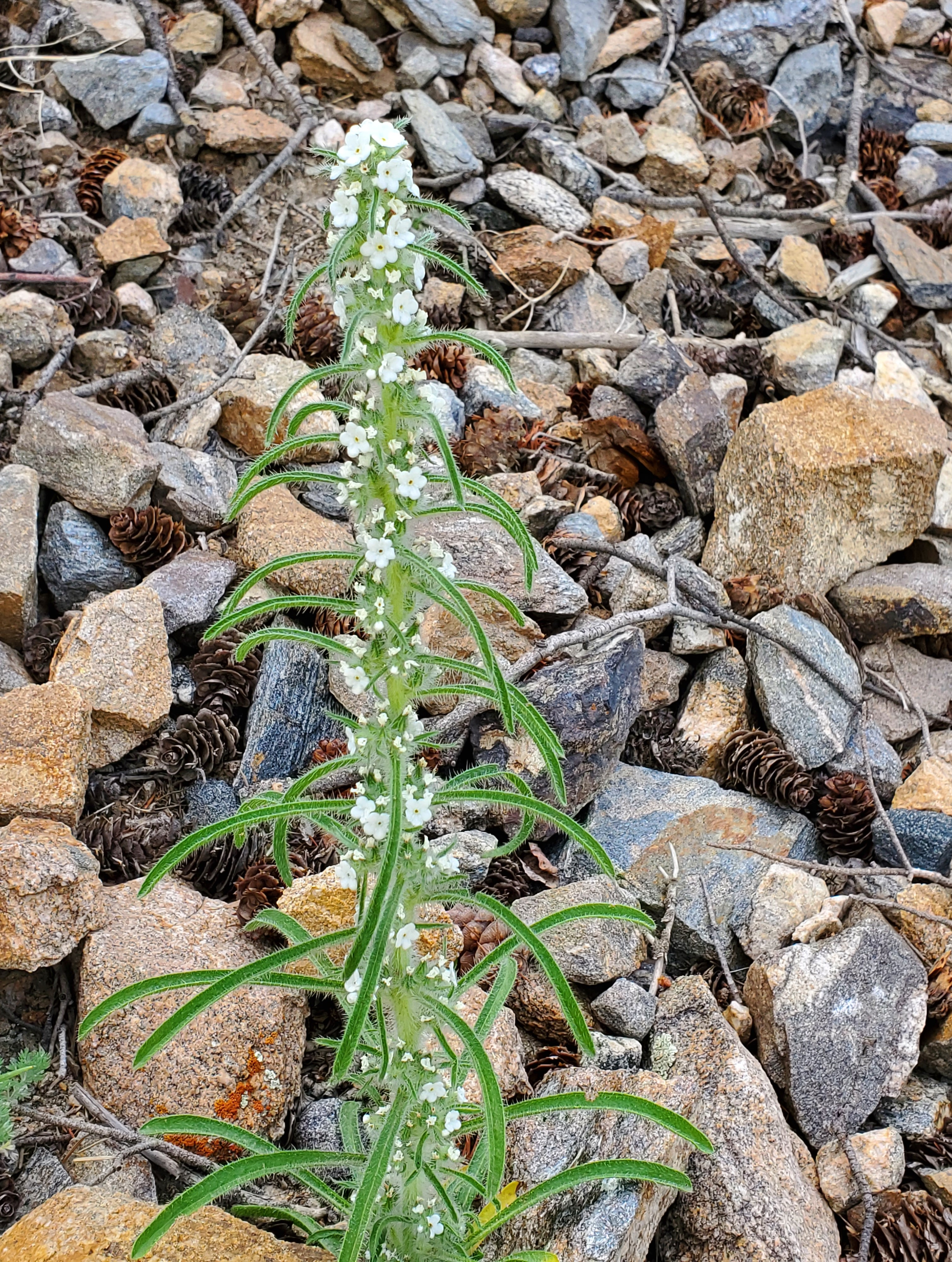
- Habit
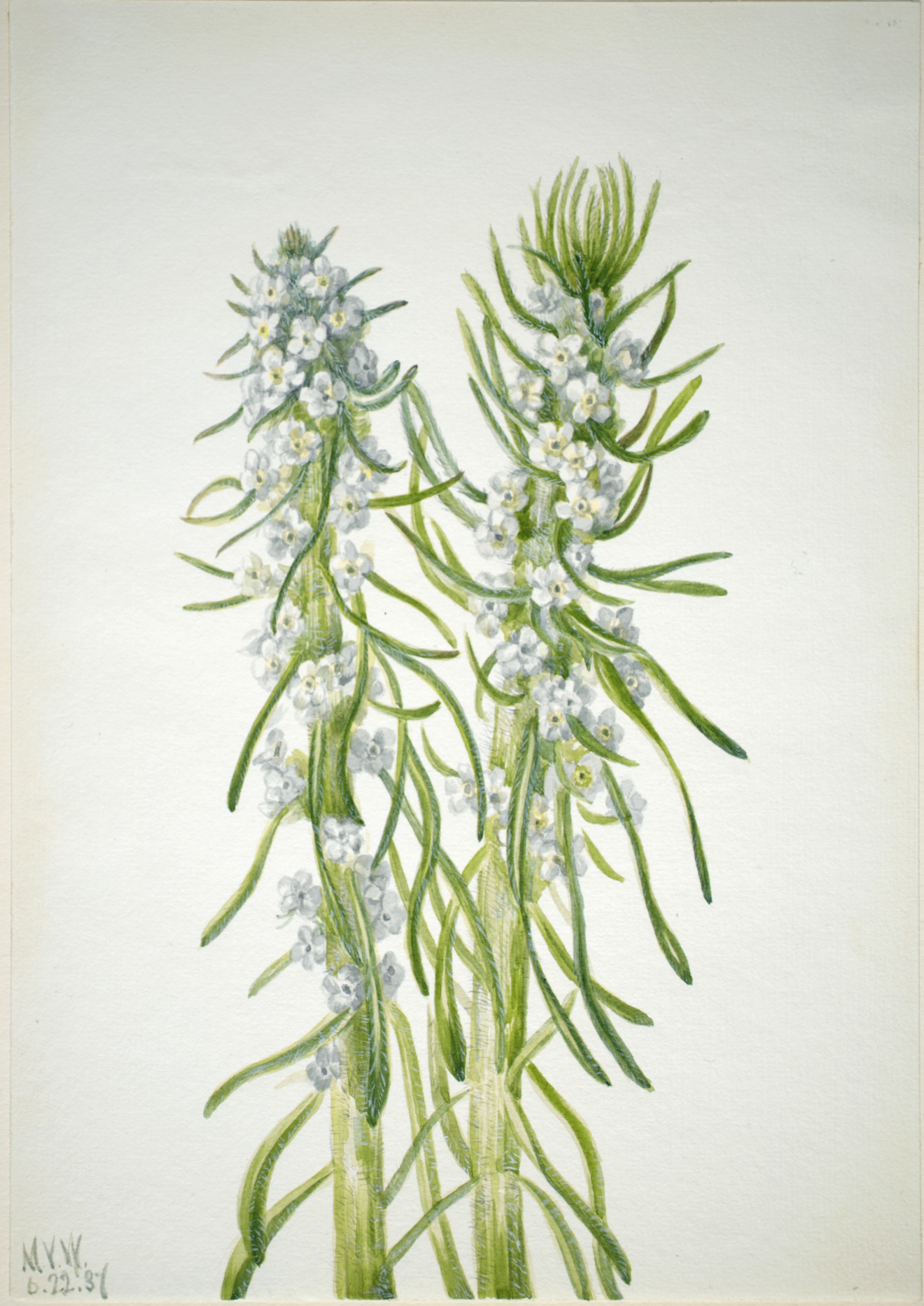
- Botanical illustration by Mary Vaux Walcott

Scientific classification
- Kingdom: Plantae
- Clade: Tracheophytes
- Clade: Angiosperms
- Clade: Eudicots
- Clade: Asterids
- Order: Boraginales
- Family: Boraginaceae
- Genus: Oreocarya
- Species: O. virgata

Binomial name
- Oreocarya virgata (Porter) Greene

Synonyms
- List: Cryptantha virgata (Porter) Payson; Eritrichium glomeratum var. virgatum (Porter) Porter; Eritrichium virgatum Porter; Krynitzkia virgata A.Gray; Oreocarya spicata Rydb.; Oreocarya virgata f. spicata (Rydb.) J.F.Macbr.

= Oreocarya virgata =

Species of plant

Oreocarya virgata (syn. Cryptantha virgata), the miner's candle, is a species of flowering plant in the family Boraginaceae, native to the U.S. states of Wyoming and Colorado. It is a biennial herb reaching 0.9 m (3 ft), with white flowers.
