= Oreocarya subcapitata =

Conservation status
- Imperiled (NatureServe)

Scientific classification
- Kingdom: Plantae
- Clade: Tracheophytes
- Clade: Angiosperms
- Clade: Eudicots
- Clade: Asterids
- Order: Boraginales
- Family: Boraginaceae
- Genus: Oreocarya
- Species: O. subcapitata

Binomial name
- Oreocarya subcapitata (Dorn & Lichvar) R.B.Kelley

Synonyms
- Cryptantha subcapitata Dorn & Lichvar

Species of flowering plant

Oreocarya subcapitata is a species of flowering plant in the family Boraginaceae known by the common names Owl Creek miner's candle, Wallowa cat's eye, and Wallowa cryptantha. It is endemic to Wyoming in the United States, where it is limited to the Owl Creek and Bridger Mountains in Fremont County. There are three populations, with a total of about 38,000 individuals.

This plant is a perennial herb forming a low silvery mat of hairy leaves. The stems are up to 15 centimeters tall. It blooms in "sparkling white forget-me-not flowers."

This plant grows on barren, sandy and gravelly terrain on the Wind River Formation in the Wind River Basin. It grows on sandstone and limestone substrates. It occurs with other cushion-like plants such as Sphaeromeria capitata and Artemisia nova within sagebrush habitat. There are few threats to the species because the region is rugged and uninhabited.
