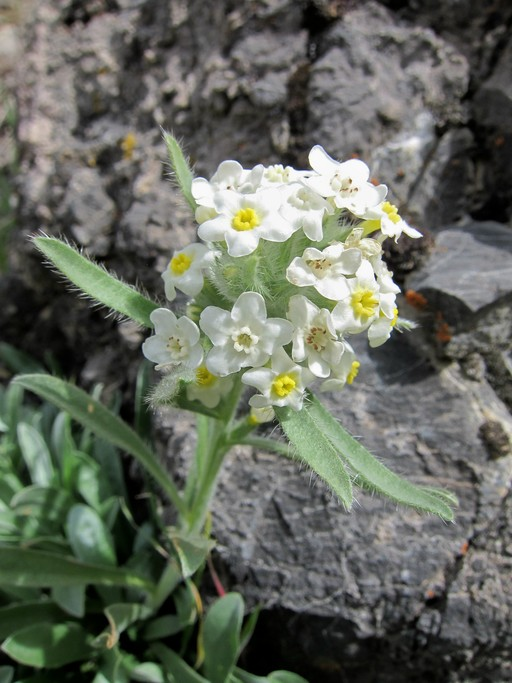

Scientific classification
- Kingdom: Plantae
- Clade: Tracheophytes
- Clade: Angiosperms
- Clade: Eudicots
- Clade: Asterids
- Order: Boraginales
- Family: Boraginaceae
- Genus: Oreocarya
- Species: O. humilis

Binomial name
- Oreocarya humilis (A.Gray) Greene

Synonyms
- List: Cryptantha alpicola Cronquist; Cryptantha humilis (A.Gray) Payson; Cryptantha humilis var. commixta (J.F.Macbr.) L.C.Higgins; Cryptantha humilis var. nana (Eastw.) L.C.Higgins; Cryptantha humilis var. ovina (Payson) L.C.Higgins; Cryptantha humilis var. shantzii (Tidestr.) L.C.Higgins; Cryptantha nana (Eastw.) Payson; Cryptantha nana var. commixta (J.F.Macbr.) Payson; Cryptantha nana var. ovina Payson; Cryptantha nana var. shantzii (Tidestr.) Payson; Cryptantha nana var. typica Payson, not validly publ.; Eritrichium glomeratum var. humile A.Gray; Oreocarya alpicola (Cronquist) D.W.Taylor; Oreocarya commixta J.F.Macbr.; Oreocarya dolosa J.F.Macbr.; Oreocarya hispida A.Nelson & P.B.Kenn.; Oreocarya humilis subsp. nana (Eastw.) W.A.Weber; Oreocarya nana Eastw.; Oreocarya shantzii Tidestr.

= Oreocarya humilis =

Species of flowering plant

Oreocarya humilis, synonym Cryptantha humilis, is a perennial plant in the borage family (Boraginaceae), native to the western United States. It may be called low cryptantha.

== Description ==
Oreocarya humilis has small, densely leafy stems, giving it a cushion-like appearance, and is relatively low growing, hence the common name. The hairy leaves are spoon-shaped. The inflorescences have five-lobed, white flowers with a yellow ring inside the upper throat, and are less than 1/2 in (1.3 cm) wide. The ovate fruits (nutlets) are more wrinkled than those of O. nubigena.

== Distribution and habitat ==
Oreocarya humilis is native to the western United States: Arizona, California, Colorado, Idaho, Montana, Nevada, Oregon, and Utah. In the Sierra Nevada range, it is found in dry, gravely soils of the sagebrush scrub community, in subalpine forest, and the alpine zone, up to 11,900 feet (3,600 m).
