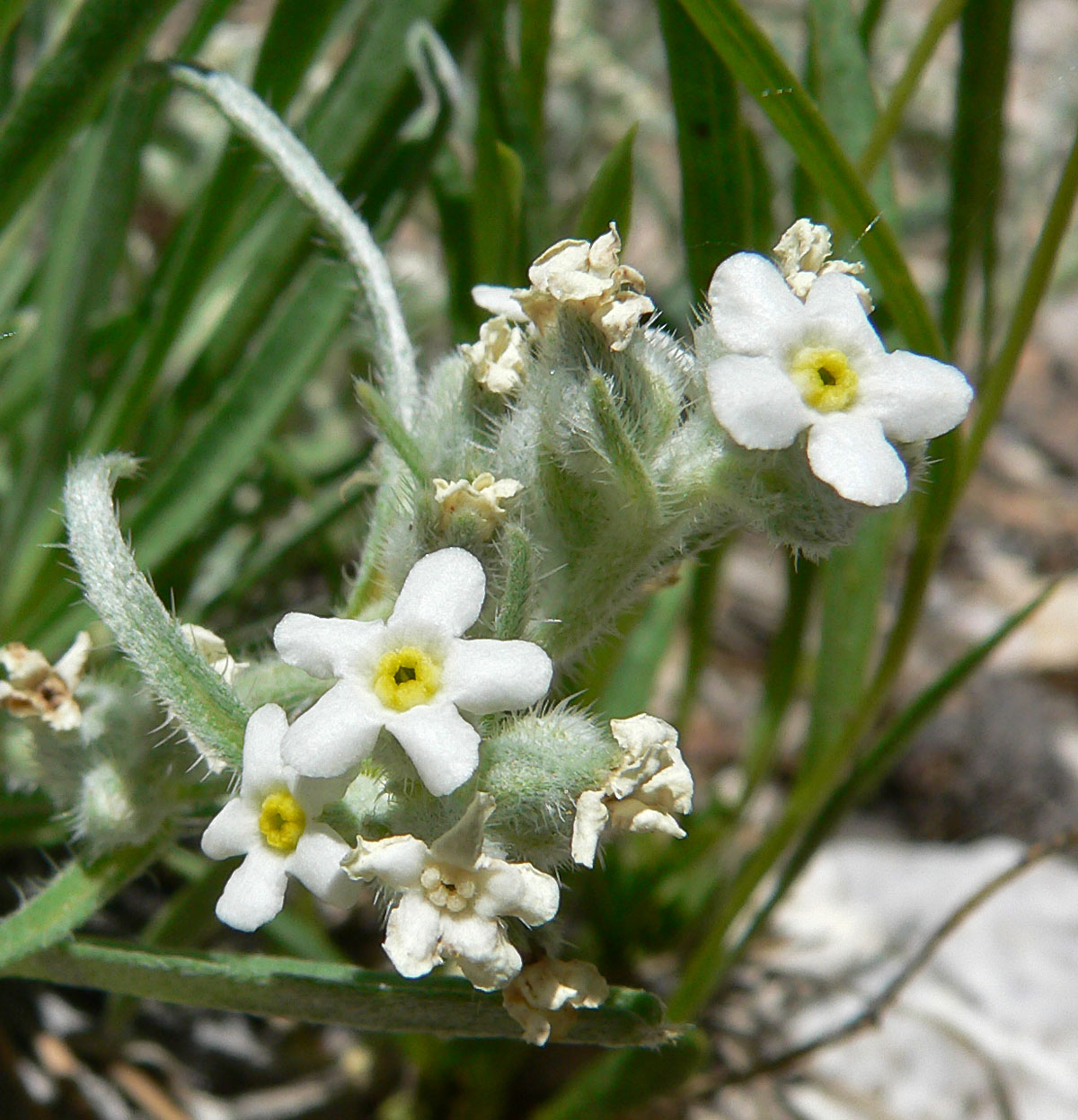

Conservation status
- Secure (NatureServe)

Scientific classification
- Kingdom: Plantae
- Clade: Tracheophytes
- Clade: Angiosperms
- Clade: Eudicots
- Clade: Asterids
- Order: Boraginales
- Family: Boraginaceae
- Genus: Oreocarya
- Species: O. flavoculata

Binomial name
- Oreocarya flavoculata A.Nelson

Synonyms
- Cryptantha flavoculata (A.Nelson) Payson; Oreocarya cristata Eastw.; Oreocarya eastwoodiae A.Nelson & P.B.Kenn.; Oreocarya flavoculata var. spatulata A.Nelson; Oreocarya shockleyi Eastw.

= Oreocarya flavoculata =

Species of flowering plant

Oreocarya flavoculata is a species of flowering plant in the family Boraginaceae known by the common name roughseed cryptantha. It is native to the western United States from California to Montana, where it is common in many types of habitat. It is a perennial herb growing an unbranching stem up to about 35 centimeters tall from a woody caudex. It is coated in soft bristly hairs. The densely hairy to bristly leaves vary in shape and may reach 11 centimeters long. The inflorescence is a cylindrical cluster or rounded head of flowers which elongates as the fruits develop from the bottom up. Each tubular flower is about a centimeter long topped with a five-lobed white corolla with yellow appendages at the center.
