= Oreocarya nubigena =

Scientific classification
- Kingdom: Plantae
- Clade: Tracheophytes
- Clade: Angiosperms
- Clade: Eudicots
- Clade: Asterids
- Order: Boraginales
- Family: Boraginaceae
- Genus: Oreocarya
- Species: O. nubigena

Binomial name
- Oreocarya nubigena Greene

Synonyms
- Cryptantha nubigena (Greene) Payson

Species of flowering plant

Oreocarya nubigena, synonym Cryptantha nubigena, is a perennial plant in the borage family (Boraginaceae), native to western North America. It may be called the Sierra cryptantha and Sierra oreocarya.

== Description ==
Oreocarya nubigena has short, leafy stems, but is less densely leafy than Oreocarya humilis (syn. Cryptantha humilis). The hairy leaves are spoon-shaped. The flowers are white and less than 1/5 in (5 mm) wide. The wrinkled ovate fruits (nutlets) are more smooth than O. humilis.

== Distribution and habitat ==
Oreocarya nubigena is native to Alberta and British Columbia in western Canada, and to California, Idaho, Nevada, and Oregon in the western United States. In California and Nevada, it is found in the central and southern Sierra Nevada mountains, up to the alpine zone at 12,900 feet (3,900 m).
