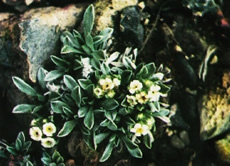

Conservation status
- Critically Imperiled (NatureServe)

Scientific classification
- Kingdom: Plantae
- Clade: Tracheophytes
- Clade: Angiosperms
- Clade: Eudicots
- Clade: Asterids
- Order: Boraginales
- Family: Boraginaceae
- Genus: Oreocarya
- Species: O. roosiorum

Binomial name
- Oreocarya roosiorum (Munz) R.B.Kelley, Hasenstab & M.G.Simpson

Synonyms
- Cryptantha roosiorum Munz

= Oreocarya roosiorum =

Species of flowering plant

Oreocarya roosiorum is a species of flowering plant in the family Boraginaceae known by the common name bristlecone cryptantha.

It is endemic to Inyo County, California, where it is known from only a few occurrences in the northern Inyo Mountains.

It is a small, mat-forming perennial herb just a few centimeters high which grows from a woody caudex rooted in rocky soils. The leaves are up to about a centimeter long, oval to spoon-shaped, and hairy to bristly. The inflorescence is a dense cluster of tiny white flowers with five-lobed white corollas with yellow appendages.
