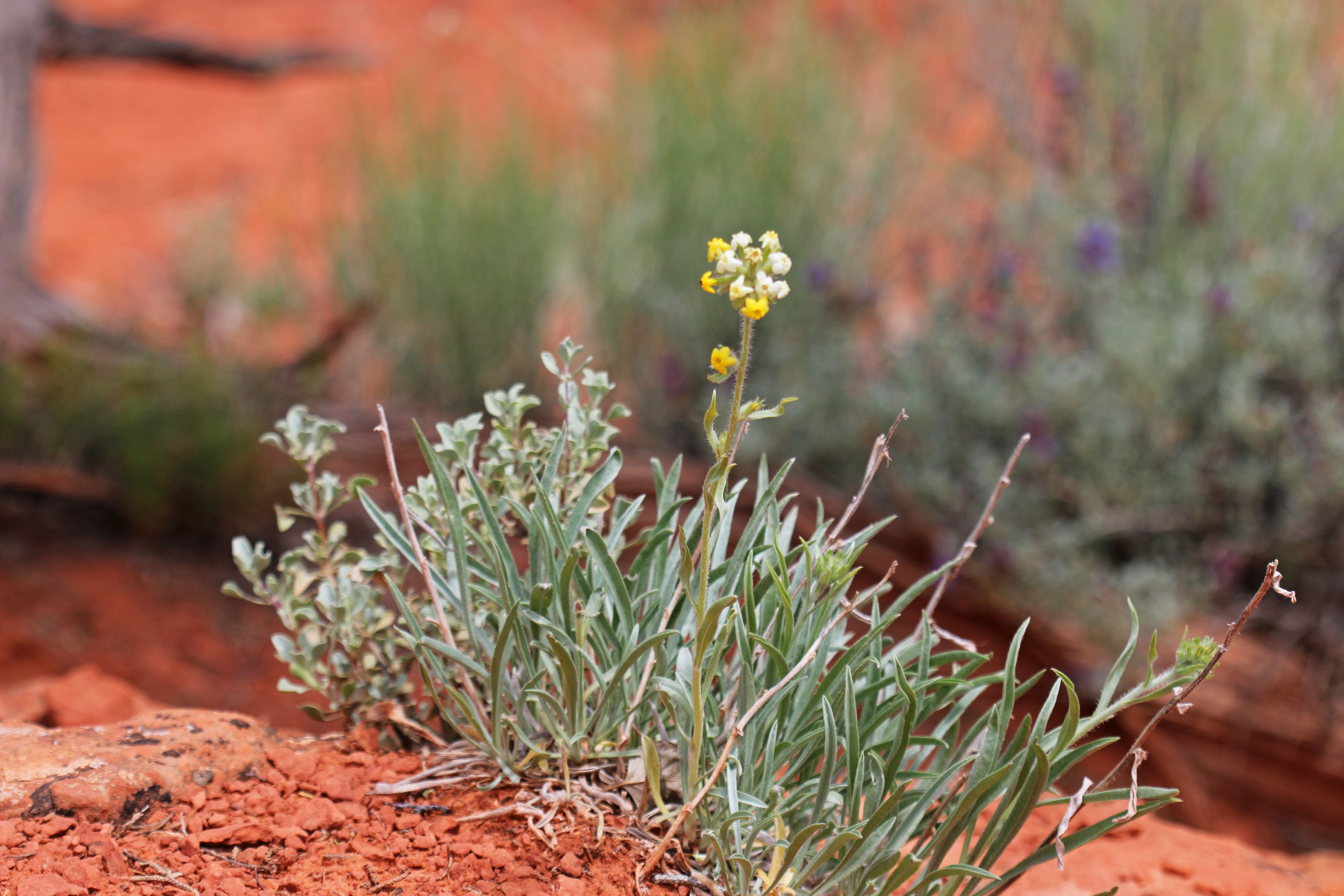
- Basin yellow catseye (Oreocarya confertiflora)

Scientific classification
- Kingdom: Plantae
- Clade: Tracheophytes
- Clade: Angiosperms
- Clade: Eudicots
- Clade: Asterids
- Order: Boraginales
- Family: Boraginaceae
- Genus: Oreocarya; Greene

Species
- See text.

= Oreocarya =

Genus of flowering plants

Oreocarya (perennial cat's-eye) is a genus of flowering plants in the family Boraginaceae. There are about 63 species and its native range extends from western and central Canada, through western United States to north Mexico. It is part of subtribe of Amsinckiinae.

It was once thought to be a either a subgenus or synonym of Cryptantha Lehm. ex G. Don, as they both had plenty of tiny flowers, hairy leaves, and persisting dried flower stems.

Botanist William Alfred Weber later noted that the 2 genera were different in form as Oreocarya was a "biennial or perennial from rosettes of basal leaves; flowers more than 5 mm in diameter, often distinctly long-tubular with prominent yellow eye", while Cryptantha was an "annual without rosettes of basal leaves; flowers minute, less than 5 mm diameter, short-tubed with inconspicuous eye".

== Description ==
They are perennial or biennial, plants. Most species are perennials but a few (such as O. setosissima and O. virgata) are biennial. Species of Oreocarya have a taproot, with branching and a simple or branching caudex, which has a rosette of leaves at the top. From this the flowering stem rises. The herbaceous stem is various among the species, but generally the stems are foliate or bracteate, with branches bearing several helicoid cymes (as flowers). Most species have linear, spatulate (spoon shaped) or oblanceolate shaped leaves, with entire margins and a (leaf) blade that is gradually narrowed to a long, slender petiole. The flower (or inflorescence) is an open, rounded, leafy bracteate thyrsus or a helicoid shaped cyme.

== Taxonomy ==
The Latin specific epithet Oreocarya is derived from "Oreos" which is Greek for "mountain" and "caryum" is Greek for "nut".

It was first published by Edward Lee Greene in Pittonia vol.1 on page 57 in 1887.

In 1887, several species found in the genus Eritrichium were segregated out by Greene. Genus Allocarya was formed, then the genera Piptocalyx, Eremocarya and Oreocarya were formed. Oreocarya had nine former species from the genus Eritrichium. In 1896, Greene described 8 more species (of Oreocarya) and in 1899 he added 2 more species and then in 1901, he added another 2 species of Oreocarya to the genus. Other botanical authors (including Alice Eastwood and Per Axel Rydberg, added more species to the genus up until 1916. In 1916, Macbride carried out a revision of the genus (which had 45 species by then). Then in 1924, Ivan M. Johnston wrote that the genus of Oreocarya could be combined with Cryptantha. Payson in 1927 (A Monograph of the section Oreocarya of Cryptantha, Ann. Mo. Bot. Gard. 14:211-358) agreed with Johnston and all the species of Oreocarya became Cryptantha species. More species were found up until 1969 and also placed in the Cryptantha genus.

In 2012, the phylogenetic relationship of members of the genus Cryptantha was carried out, based on dna sequencing analyses, it was then proposed that the resurrection of the following genera Eremocarya, Greeneocharis, Johnstonella, and also Oreocarya. Weber and Wittman (2012) then placed all perennial species of Cryptantha back in the genus Oreocarya. Botanist John Kartesz from Missouri Botanical Garden Press agreed with the re-classification, as part of the Biota of North America Program (BONAP) in 2015.

=== Species ===
There are 63 accepted species listed by Kew, and the Biota of North America Program.

- Oreocarya abortiva Greene
- Oreocarya aperta Eastw.
- Oreocarya atwoodii (L.C.Higgins) Hasenstab & M.G.Simpson
- Oreocarya bakeri Greene
- Oreocarya barnebyi (I.M.Johnst.) Hasenstab & M.G.Simpson
- Oreocarya breviflora Osterh.
- Oreocarya caespitosa A.Nelson
- Oreocarya cana A.Nelson
- Oreocarya capitata Eastw.
- Oreocarya compacta (L.C.Higgins) R.B.Kelley
- Oreocarya confertiflora Greene
- Oreocarya crassipes (I.M.Johnst.) Hasenstab & M.G.Simpson
- Oreocarya creutzfeldtii (S.L.Welsh) R.B.Kelley
- Oreocarya crymophila (I.M.Johnst.) Jeps. & Hoover
- Oreocarya elata Eastw.
- Oreocarya flava A.Nelson
- Oreocarya flavoculata A.Nelson
- Oreocarya fulvocanescens (S.Watson) Greene
- Oreocarya glomerata (A.Gray) Greene
- Oreocarya grahamii (I.M.Johnst.) R.B.Kelley
- Oreocarya hoffmannii (I.M.Johnst.) Abrams
- Oreocarya humilis (A.Gray) Greene
- Oreocarya hypsophila (I.M.Johnst.) Hasenstab & M.G.Simpson
- Oreocarya insolita J.F.Macbr.
- Oreocarya interrupta Greene
- Oreocarya johnstonii (L.C.Higgins) Hasenstab & M.G.Simpson
- Oreocarya jonesiana Payson
- Oreocarya leucophaea (Douglas ex Lehm.) Greene
- Oreocarya longiflora A.Nelson
- Oreocarya mensana (M.E.Jones) Payson
- Oreocarya nubigena Greene
- Oreocarya oblata (M.E.Jones) J.F.Macbr.
- Oreocarya ochroleuca (L.C.Higgins) R.B.Kelley
- Oreocarya osterhoutii Payson
- Oreocarya palmeri (A.Gray) Greene
- Oreocarya paradoxa A.Nelson
- Oreocarya paysonii J.F.Macbr.
- Oreocarya propria A.Nelson & J.F.Macbr.
- Oreocarya revealii W.A.Weber & R.C.Wittmann
- Oreocarya rollinsii (I.M.Johnst.) W.A.Weber
- Oreocarya roosiorum (Munz) R.B.Kelley, Hasenstab & M.G.Simpson
- Oreocarya rugulosa Payson
- Oreocarya salmonensis A.Nelson & J.F.Macbr.
- Oreocarya schoolcraftii (Tiehm) R.B.Kelley
- Oreocarya semiglabra (Barneby) Hasenstab & M.G.Simpson
- Oreocarya sericea (A.Gray) Greene
- Oreocarya setosissima (A.Gray) Greene
- Oreocarya shackletteana (L.C.Higgins) R.B.Kelley
- Oreocarya sobolifera (Payson) R.B.Kelley
- Oreocarya spiculifera Piper
- Oreocarya stricta Osterh.
- Oreocarya subcapitata (Dorn & Lichvar) R.B.Kelley
- Oreocarya subretusa (I.M.Johnst.) Abrams
- Oreocarya suffruticosa (Torr.) Greene
- Oreocarya tenuis Eastw.
- Oreocarya thompsonii (I.M.Johnst.) Abrams
- Oreocarya thyrsiflora Greene
- Oreocarya tumulosa Payson
- Oreocarya virgata (Porter) Greene
- Oreocarya virginensis (M.E.Jones) J.F.Macbr.
- Oreocarya weberi (I.M.Johnst.) W.A.Weber
- Oreocarya welshii (K.H.Thorne & L.C.Higgins) R.B.Kelley
- Oreocarya wetherillii Eastw.

== Distribution ==
It is found in Canada (within the provinces of Alberta, British Columbia and Saskatchewan) in the United States (within the states of Alaska, Arizona, California, Colorado, Idaho, Kansas, Montana, Nebraska, Nevada, New Mexico, North Dakota, Oklahoma, Oregon, South Dakota, Texas, Utah, Washington and Wyoming) and also in northern Mexico. Most species are found in the Colorado Plateau and the Great Basin of the U.S.

== Ecology ==
Most species grow in xerophytic habitats at middle elevations. Only a few species can tolerate growing in the shade of overhanging trees or shrubs. Some species grow in sandy deserts (O. jamesii), on alpine slopes (such as O. weberi, O. crymophile and O. thompsonii), O. virginensis, O. rugulosa and O. semiglabra can tolerate clay soils, but no species grows in moist and undrained soils.

== Other sources ==
- Cronquist, A. et al. 1972-. Intermountain flora.
- Johnston, I. M. 1927. Studies in the Boraginaceae VI. A revision of the South American Boraginoideae. Contr. Gray Herb. 78:31.
