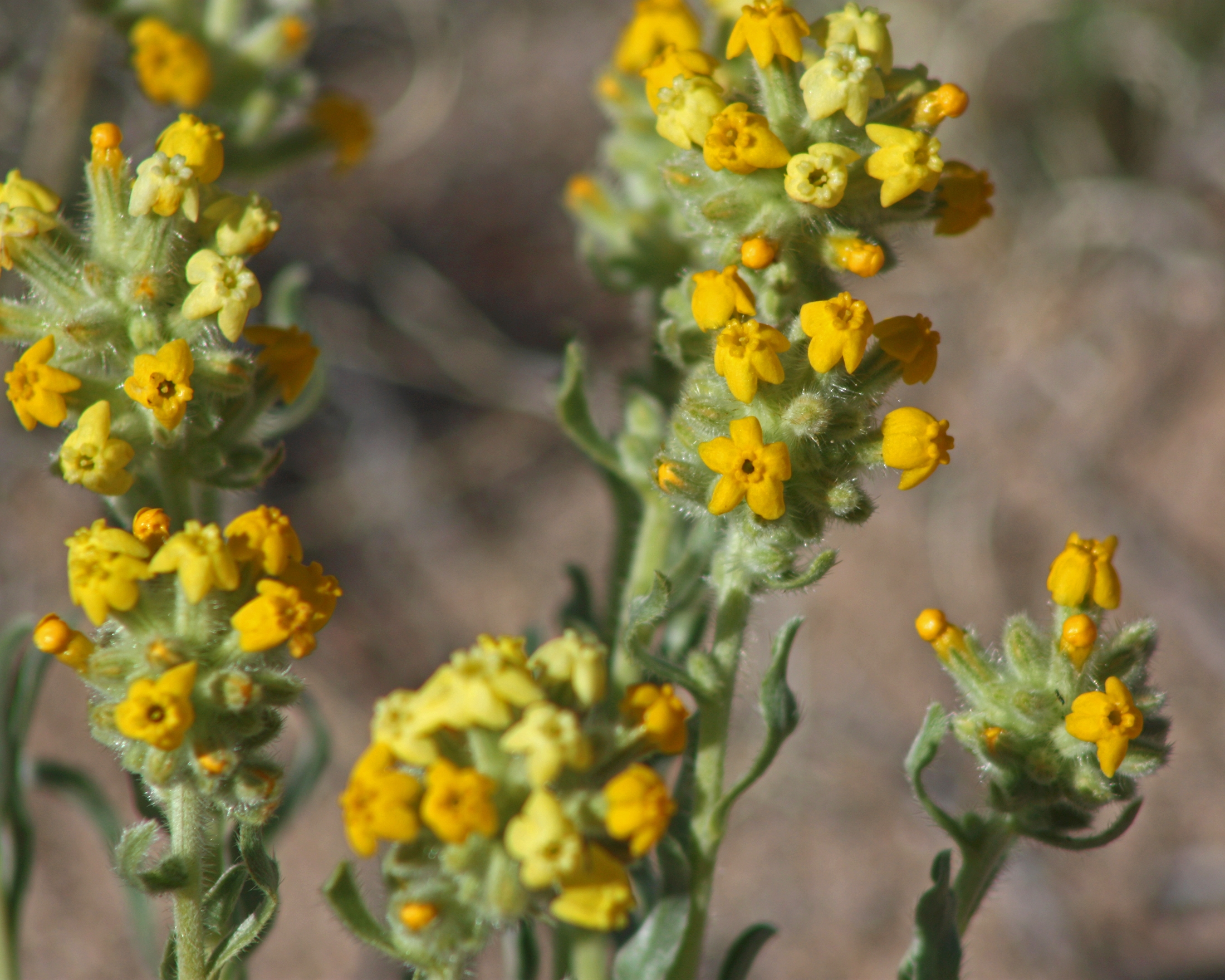
- Cryptantha flava in Petrified Forest National Park

Scientific classification
- Kingdom: Plantae
- Clade: Tracheophytes
- Clade: Angiosperms
- Clade: Eudicots
- Clade: Asterids
- Order: Boraginales
- Family: Boraginaceae
- Genus: Cryptantha
- Species: C. flava

Binomial name
- Cryptantha flava (A.Nelson) Payson

= Cryptantha flava =

Species of flowering plant

Cryptantha flava, commonly known as plateau yellow miner's candle, yellow cryptantha, and Brenda's yellow cryptantha, is a yellow-flowered perennial plant in the borage family found in the southwestern United States. It grows in sandy soils.

== Description ==
The stems of this hairy plant grow in clumps, reaching 25 centimetres (10 in) tall. The leaves are up to 10 cm (4 in) long, narrowly lanceolate, and broadest at the base.

From April to August, coils of yellow funnel-shaped flowers appear, each about 1.5 cm (1/2 in) long.

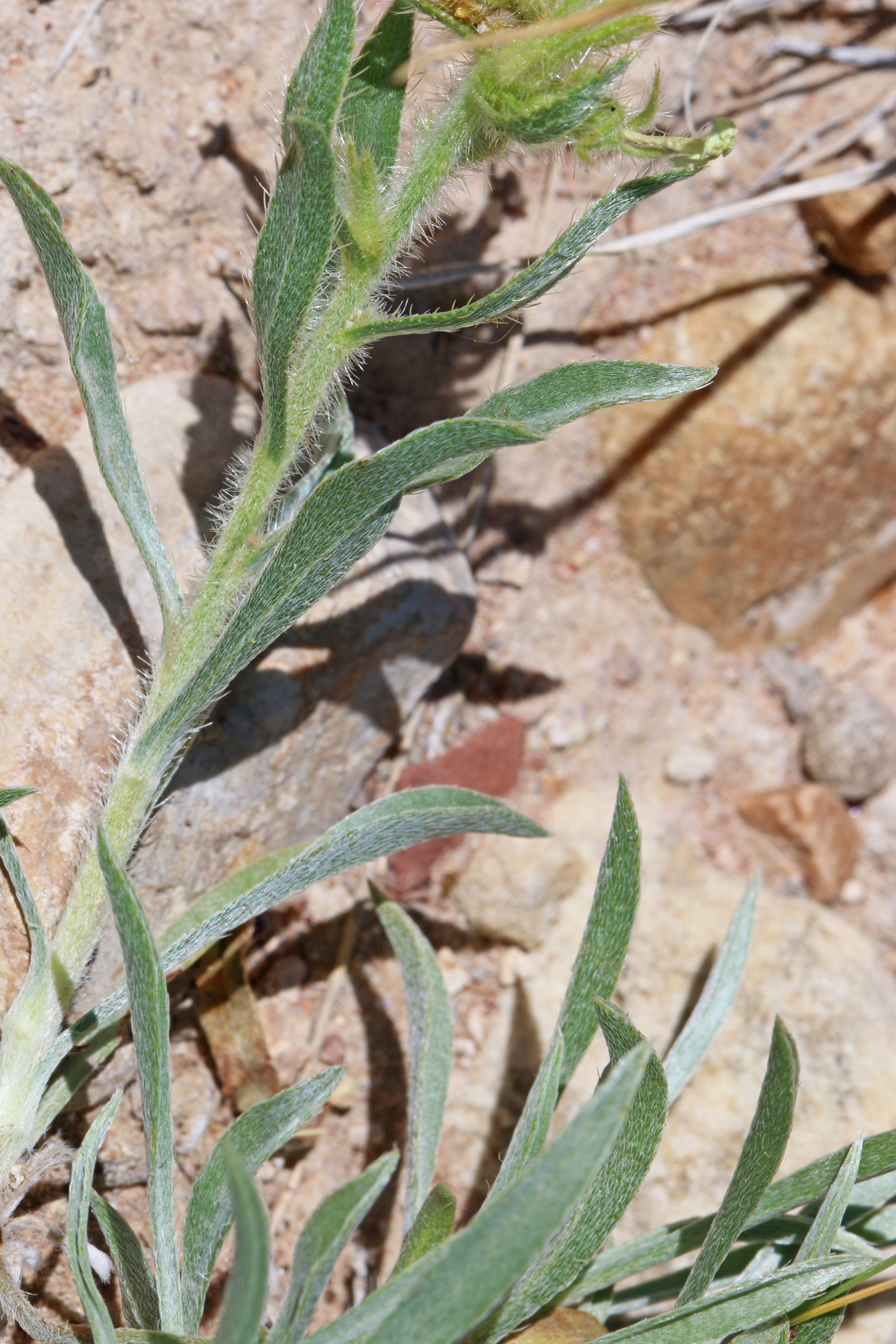
Leaves

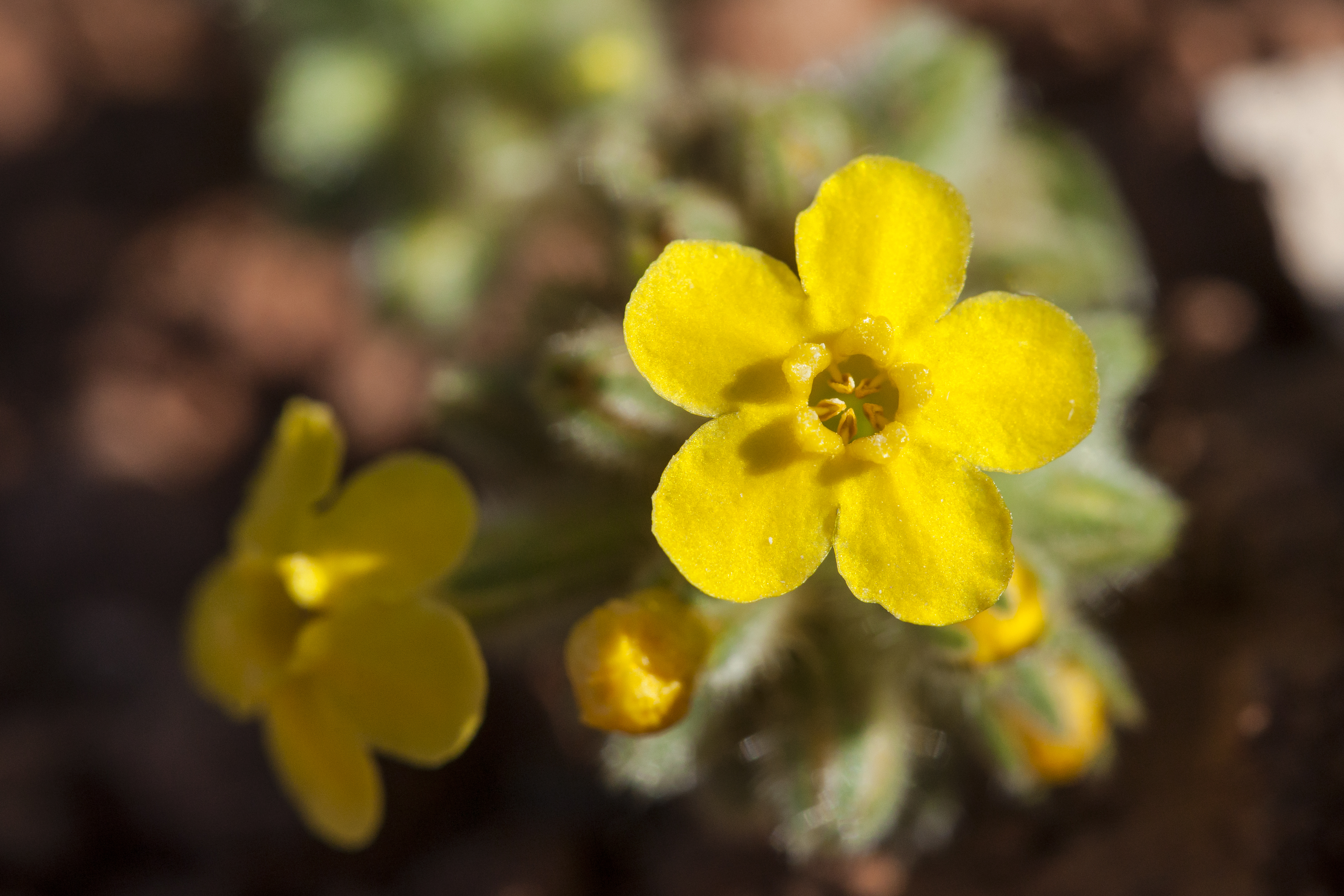
Flowers close-up

=== Similar species ===
The most similar species associated with the genus is Oreocarya confertiflora.

== Distribution and habitat ==
It is found in the Colorado Plateau and Canyonlands region of the southwestern United States. It grows in sandy soils and open areas.
