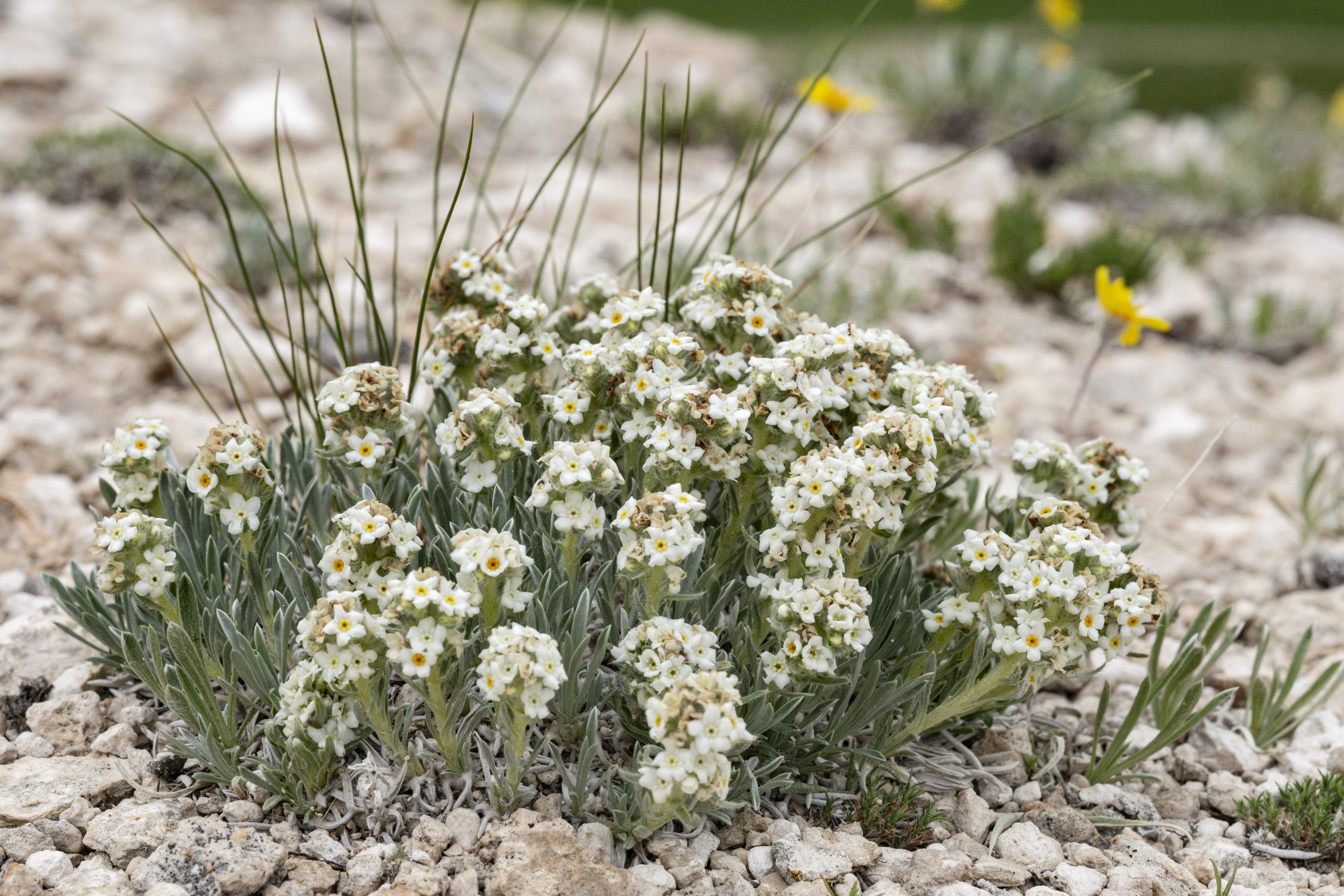
- On Fremont Butte, Washington County, Colorado

Conservation status
- Apparently Secure (NatureServe)

Scientific classification
- Kingdom: Plantae
- Clade: Tracheophytes
- Clade: Angiosperms
- Clade: Eudicots
- Clade: Asterids
- Order: Boraginales
- Family: Boraginaceae
- Genus: Oreocarya
- Species: O. cana

Binomial name
- Oreocarya cana A.Nelson

Synonyms
- Cryptantha cana (A.Nelson) Payson

= Oreocarya cana =

Plant species in the borage family

Oreocarya cana is a long-lived species of perennial plant known by the common names mountain cryptantha and mountain cat's-eye in the family Boraginaceae. It is found in the western and central United States.

== Description ==
Oreocarya cana is a perennial plant, forming caespitose mats from a thick caudex with many inflorescences that are 40 to 150 mm (1.6 to 5.9 in) tall, narrow, and typically restricted to the upper half of the stem. Stems are densely but rather weakly covered in bristly hairs, and support inconspicuous foliar bracts. Sepals are 3–6 mm (1/8–1/4 in) long and finely covered in setose hairs. Tubular corollas are composed of five fused white petals roughly 3 mm (1/8 in) long, and are actinomorphic (radially symmetrical), with prominent yellow eyes (fornices).

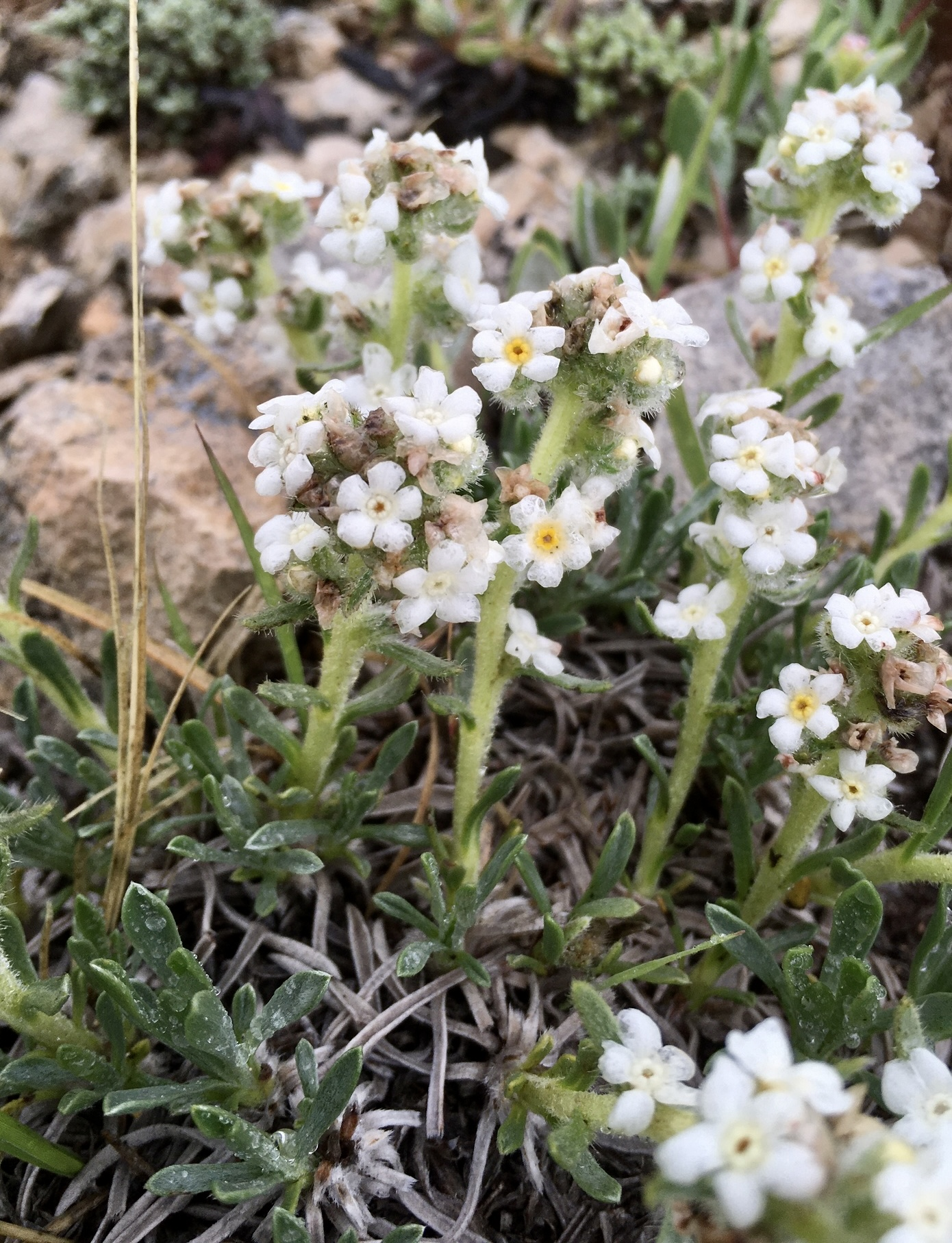
Flowers, stems, and foliage.

Leaves are crowded near the main caudex, and are narrowly oblanceolate, reaching lengths of 20–60 mm (3/4–2 3/8 in) long. Leaves are densely and uniformly silky strigose, giving a smooth appearance to the naked eye, and are very inconspicuously pustulate abaxially(on the underside) and covered in bristly, setose hairs, while pustules on adaxial(upper) surfaces are highly obscured.

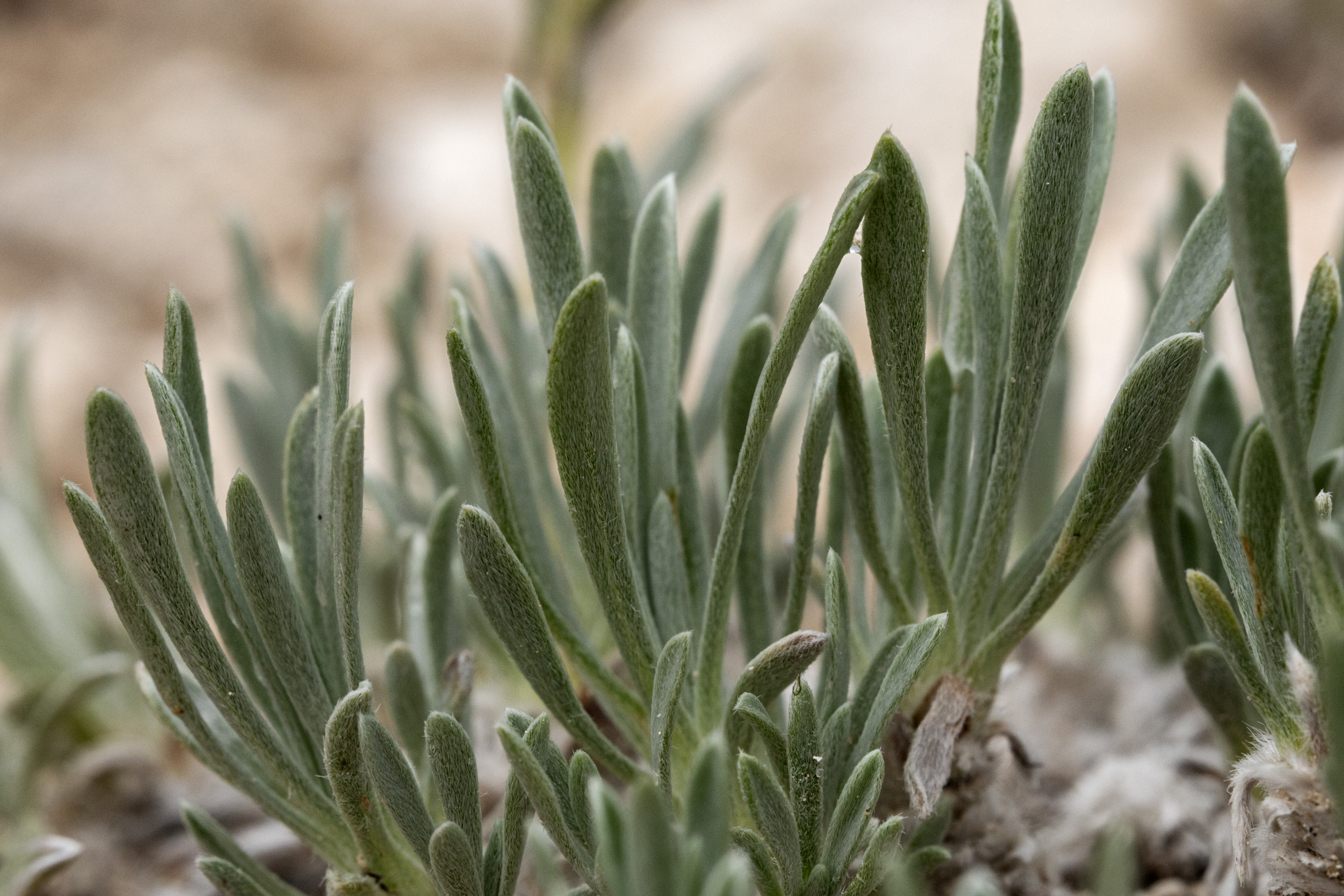
Close-up view of appressed, silky-strigose hairs.

Once successfully pollinated, fruits are produced in the form of nutlets. Each flower typically only produces one mature nutlet, but can produce more. Nutlets are lance-ovoid in shape, usually asymmetrical, and are quite small at only 3–3.5 mm (0.12–0.14 in) long, with dull surfaces and scar widened at the base.

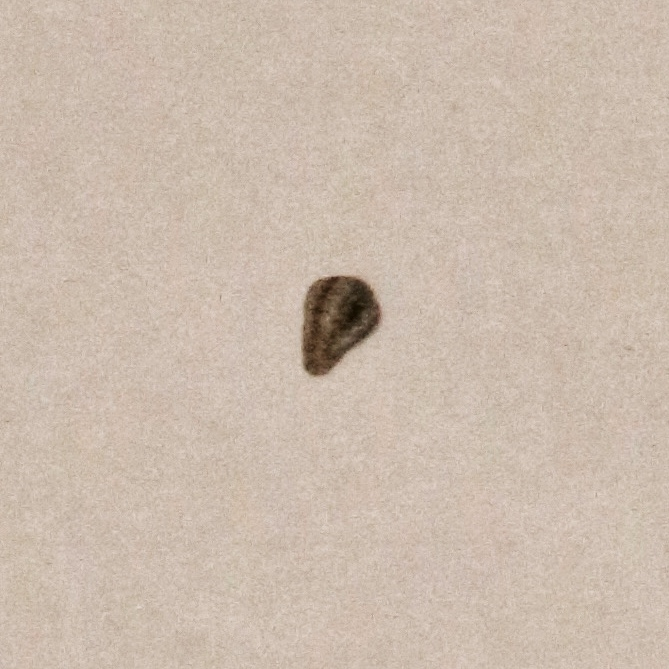
A mature nutlet, from Weld County, Colorado.

Easily distinguished from other species in its region as Oreocarya cana is the only species in its genus east of the Rockies that forms densely caespitose mats.

== Taxonomy ==
Oreocarya cana was scientifically described and named by Aven Nelson in 1902. Nelson was an American botanist and professor at the University of Wyoming, that specialized in plants of the Rocky Mountains. In 1927 it was moved to Cryptantha as Cryptantha cana and placed in section Oreocarya by the botanist Edwin Blake Payson.

The earliest of these collected and examined type specimens of Oreocarya cana came from Pine Bluffs, Wyoming, collected by Johan Erik Bodin on June 27th, of 1889. Some other early specimens came from Ft. Robinson, Nebraska on June 1, of 1890, collected by Henry Walter Bates, and Pawnee Buttes, Colorado, on June 17th, of 1919, collected by George Everett Osterhout.

The binomial nomenclature, Cryptantha Cana stuck until 2012, when the Cryptantha genus was divided into different genera, with the Oreocarya section being elevated to genus, following Hasenstan-Lehman and Simpson's work on phylogenetic systematics of the genus Cryptantha.

Oreocarya cana is part of the “humilus group” of the genus Oreocarya, which houses eight species including O. cana. The “humilus group” is defined by; muricate nutlets, with an open scar, that is basally triangular, with plants typically having caespitose growth forms.

=== Names ===
The species epithet, cana, is Latin and roughly translates to "gray".

It is known by the common names mountain cryptantha and mountain cat’s-eye. “Cat’s-eye”, refers to the distinct yellow fornices, with white corollas exhibited on many species of Oreocarya that resemble eyes.

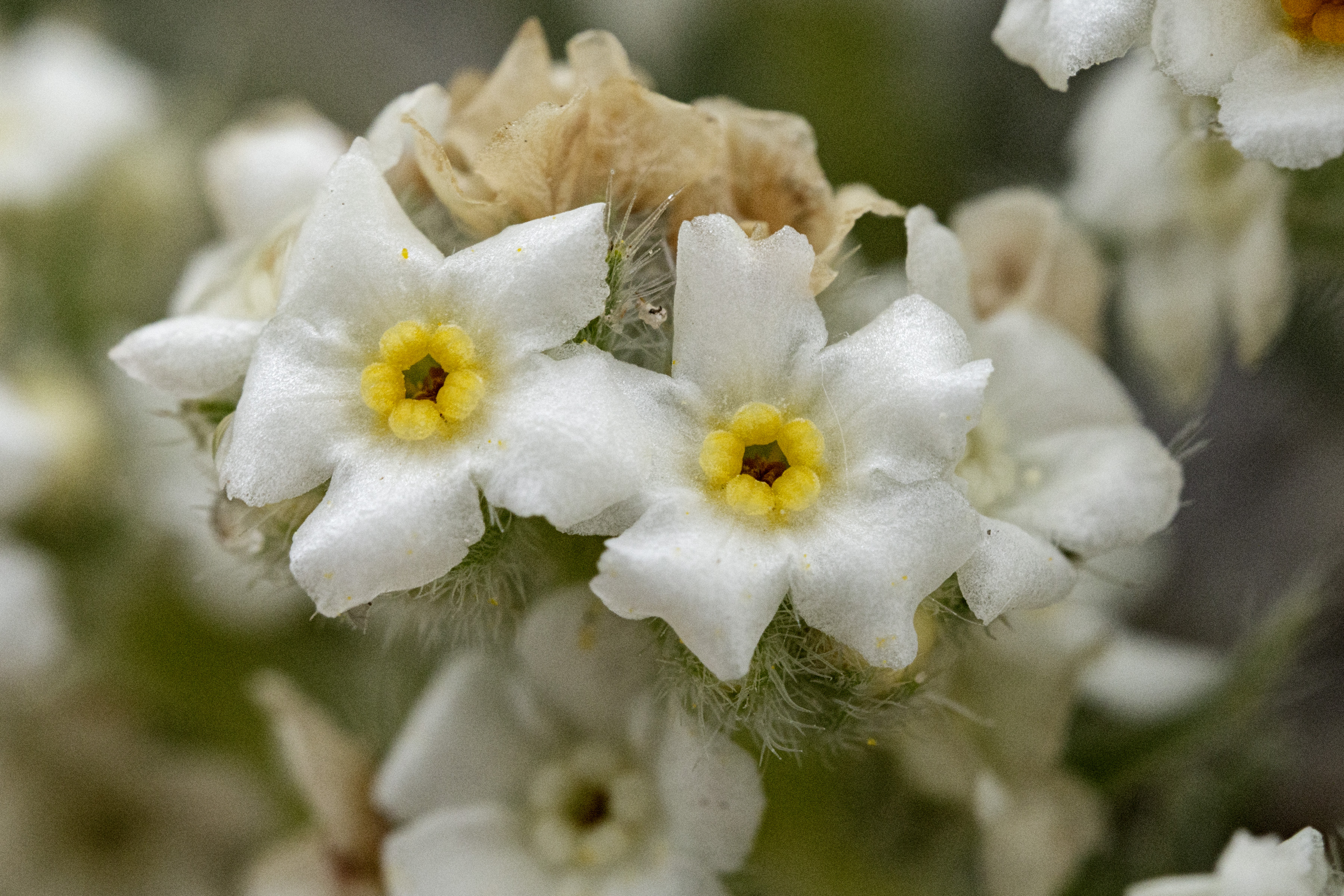
White corollas with yellow fornices

== Range and habitat ==
Primary range is the western high plains of the United States, from Northeastern Colorado, north through eastern Wyoming and western Nebraska, into southwestern South Dakota. Disjunctions of Oreocarya cana have been recorded occurring further west through Wyoming into Carbon and Bighorn counties in Montana, as well as rarely in North Dakota. Entire species range are estimates based on collected herbarium specimens.

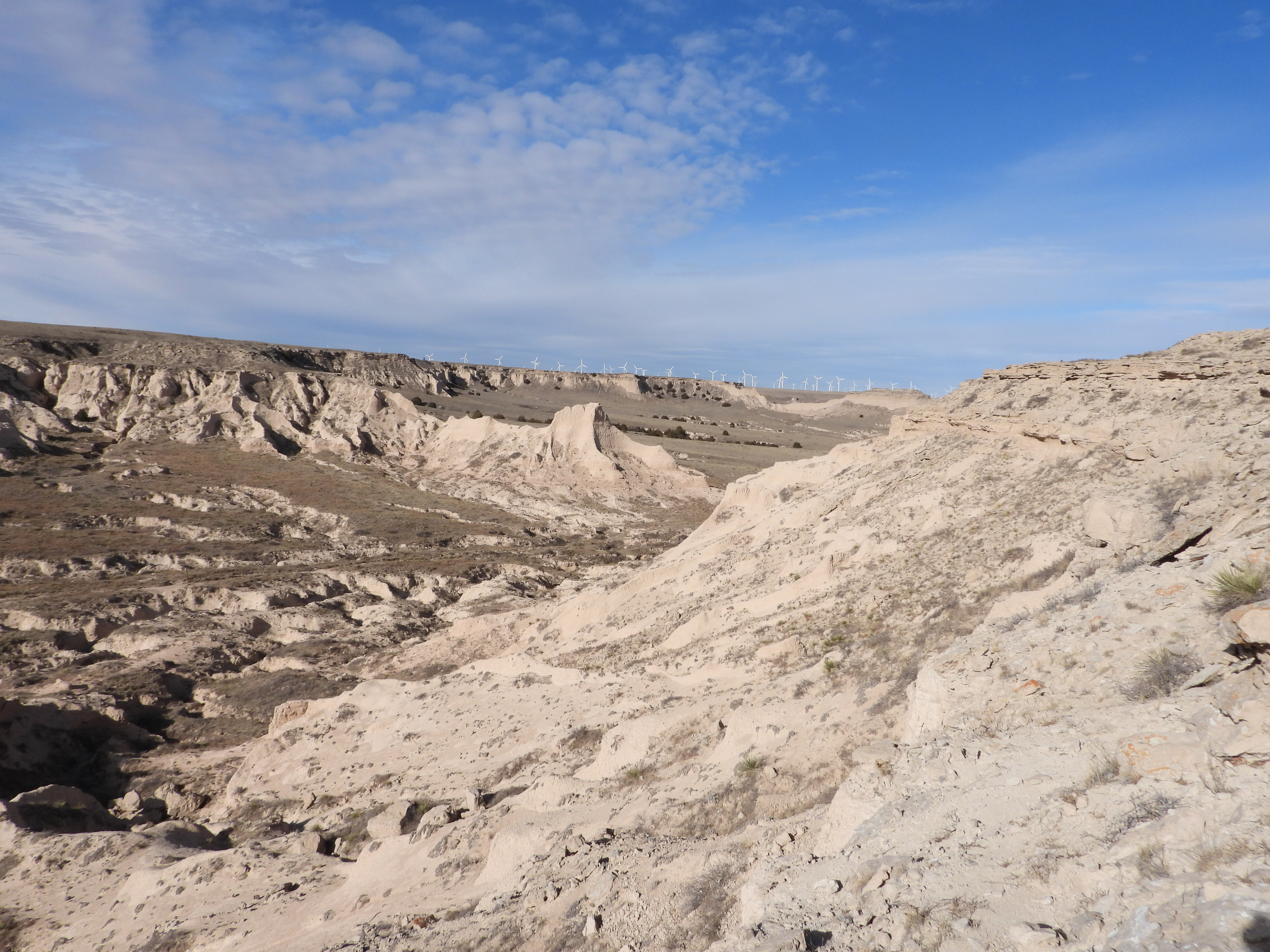
Habitat of Oreocarya cana at Pawnee National Grassland, Weld County, Colorado.

Oreocarya cana is typically found at elevations of 3,000 to 6,000 ft (910 to 1,830 m), on sites receiving 12 to 17 in (300 to 430 mm) precipitation annually. Occurrences are usually on dry, rocky, exposed sites, often occurring as a chasmophyte or lithophyte on sandstone Rimrock of bluffs and buttes, as well as on rolling plains either in Rocky Mountain Juniper and Rocky Mountain Ponderosa pine forest, or shortgrass prairie ecosystems.

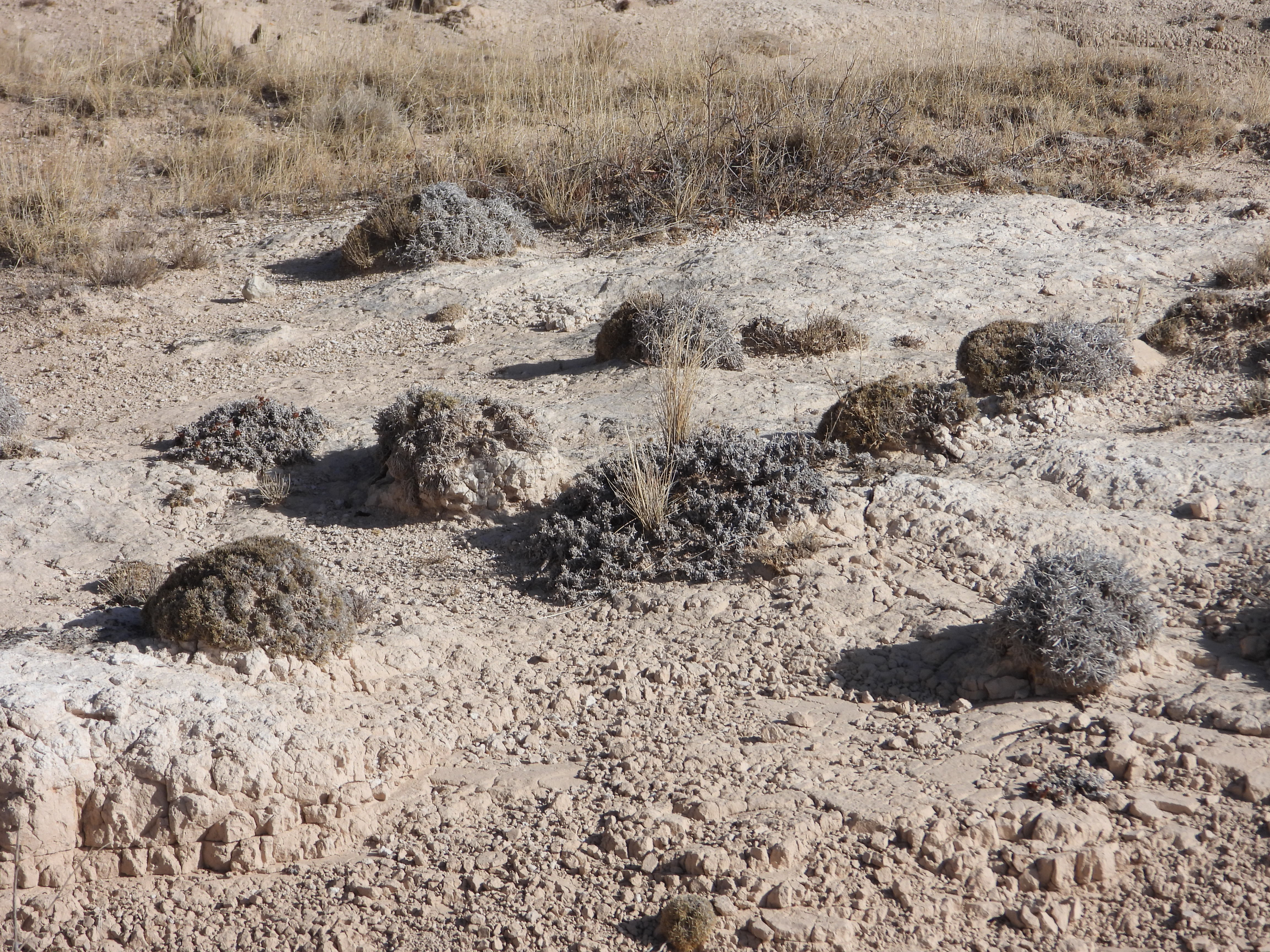
Oreocarya cana and other mat-forming plants growing on eroded sandstone outcrops.

== Ecology ==
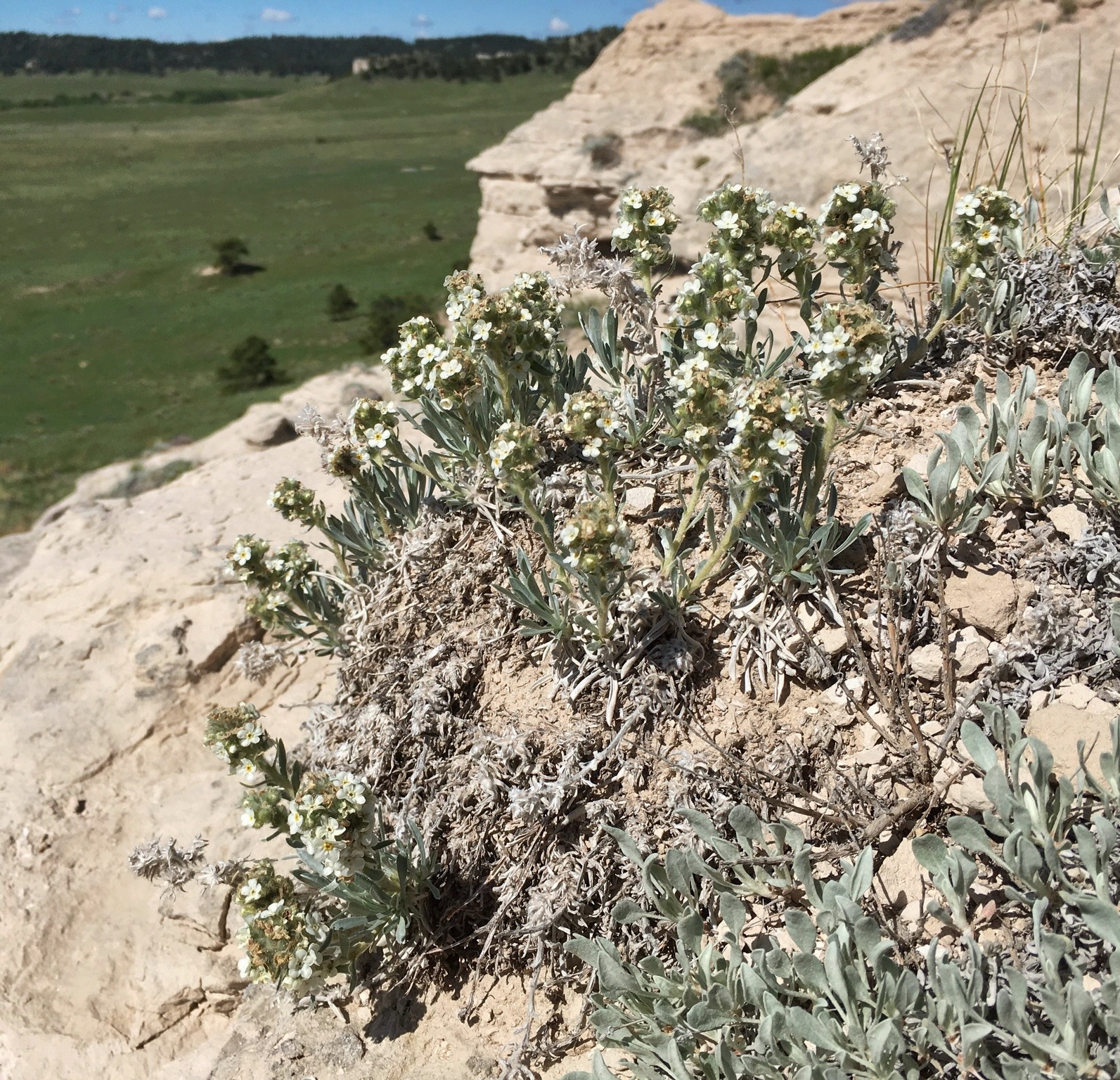
Oreocarya cana on a windswept ridge in Scotts Bluff County, Nebraska.

O. cana appears unable to compete with dominant sod-forming grasses of the shortgrass prairies such as Bouteloua gracilis and Bouteloua dactyloides that make up the climax vegetation. It escapes to shaley ridges or gravelly outcrops which periodically jut up through the prairie sod where it flourishes. In these habitats, O. cana finds itself at home with various species of Atriplex, Artemisia, Astragalus, Eriogonum, Eremogone, Physaria, Mentzelia, Penstemon, Townsendia, Phlox and other similar forms. Blooms typically occur May and June.

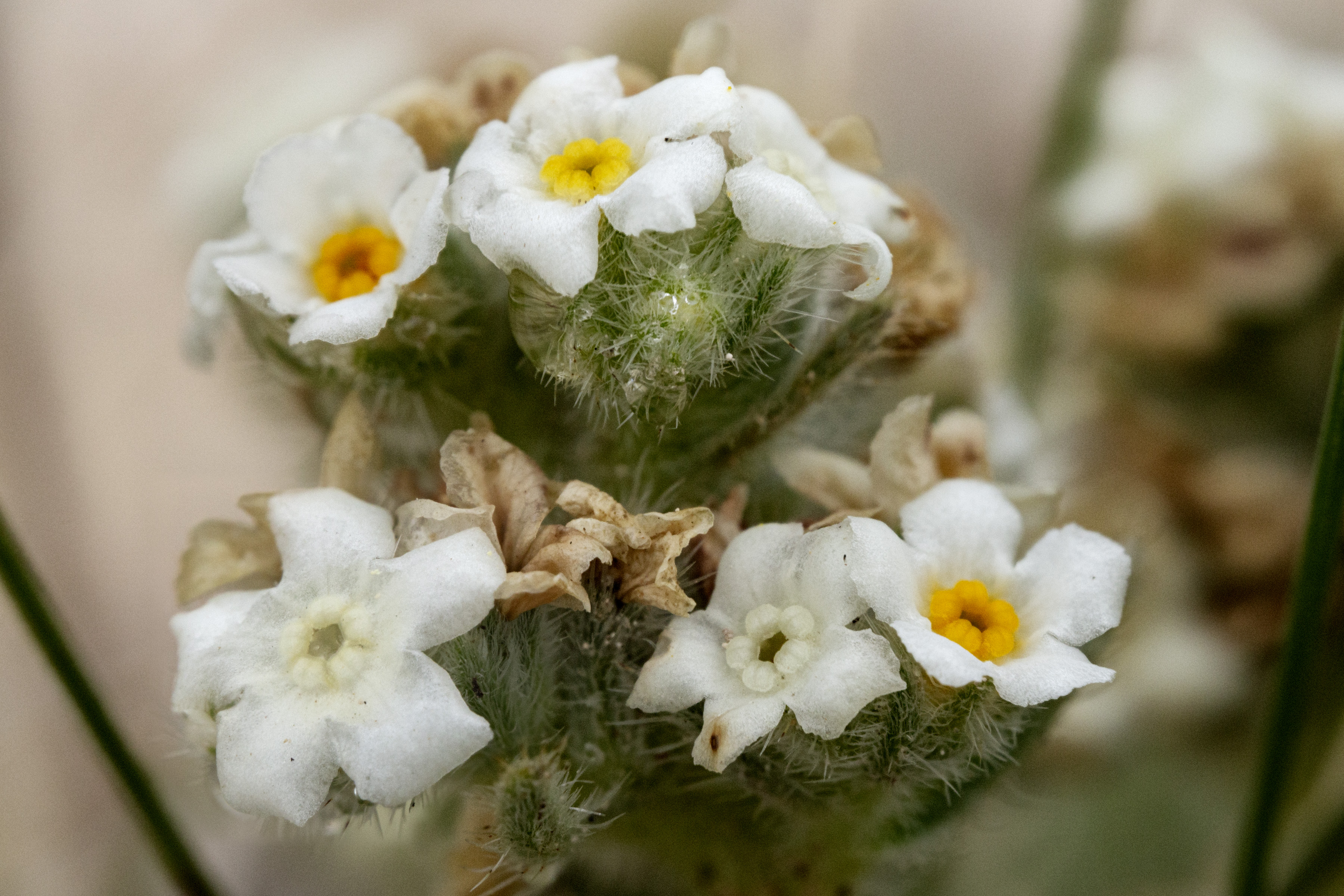
Close-up of an inflorescence.

Little in depth study has been done on most species in the genus Oreocarya regarding ecological relations with organisms from other kingdoms, but most species are known to be pollinated by insects. Lepidoptera and Coleoptera have been observed visiting several species of Oreocarya and undoubtedly serve as pollinators.

Seed dispersal mechanisms within the genus Oreocarya are almost entirely unknown. Nutlets of several species have been shown to have slightly winged margins(shown in above photo), but the size of the wing in relation to nutlet size, is such that it likely has little to no aid in wind dispersal. Seed dispersal by means of an animal vector is the most plausible answer to long-distance dispersal events.

== Conservation ==
In 2023 NatureServe evaluated the species and ranked it as apparently secure (G4) at the global level. In Montana, Wyoming, and Nebraska it is also ranked as apparently secure (S4). While in Colorado and South Dakota they evaluated it as imperiled (S2). Threats to Oreocarya cana include: overgrazing and trampling from livestock, rangeland management, and competition from invasive species.
