= Oreocarya crymophila =

Conservation status
- Vulnerable (NatureServe)

Scientific classification
- Kingdom: Plantae
- Clade: Tracheophytes
- Clade: Angiosperms
- Clade: Eudicots
- Clade: Asterids
- Order: Boraginales
- Family: Boraginaceae
- Genus: Oreocarya
- Species: O. crymophila

Binomial name
- Oreocarya crymophila (I.M.Johnst.) Jeps. & Hoover

Synonyms
- Cryptantha crymophilaI.M.Johnst.

Species of flowering plant

Oreocarya crymophila is a perennial plant in the family Boraginaceae. It is commonly called subalpine cryptantha.

== Habitat and range ==
It is found in the Alpine and Tuolumne Counties, south of Lake Tahoe, in the Sierra Nevada range of California. It is generally found in rocky volcanic soil or scree.

== Description ==
Oreocarya crymophila has many stems with prickly leaves. It grows to a height of 5–16 inches (13–40 cm). The nutlets have winged margins.
