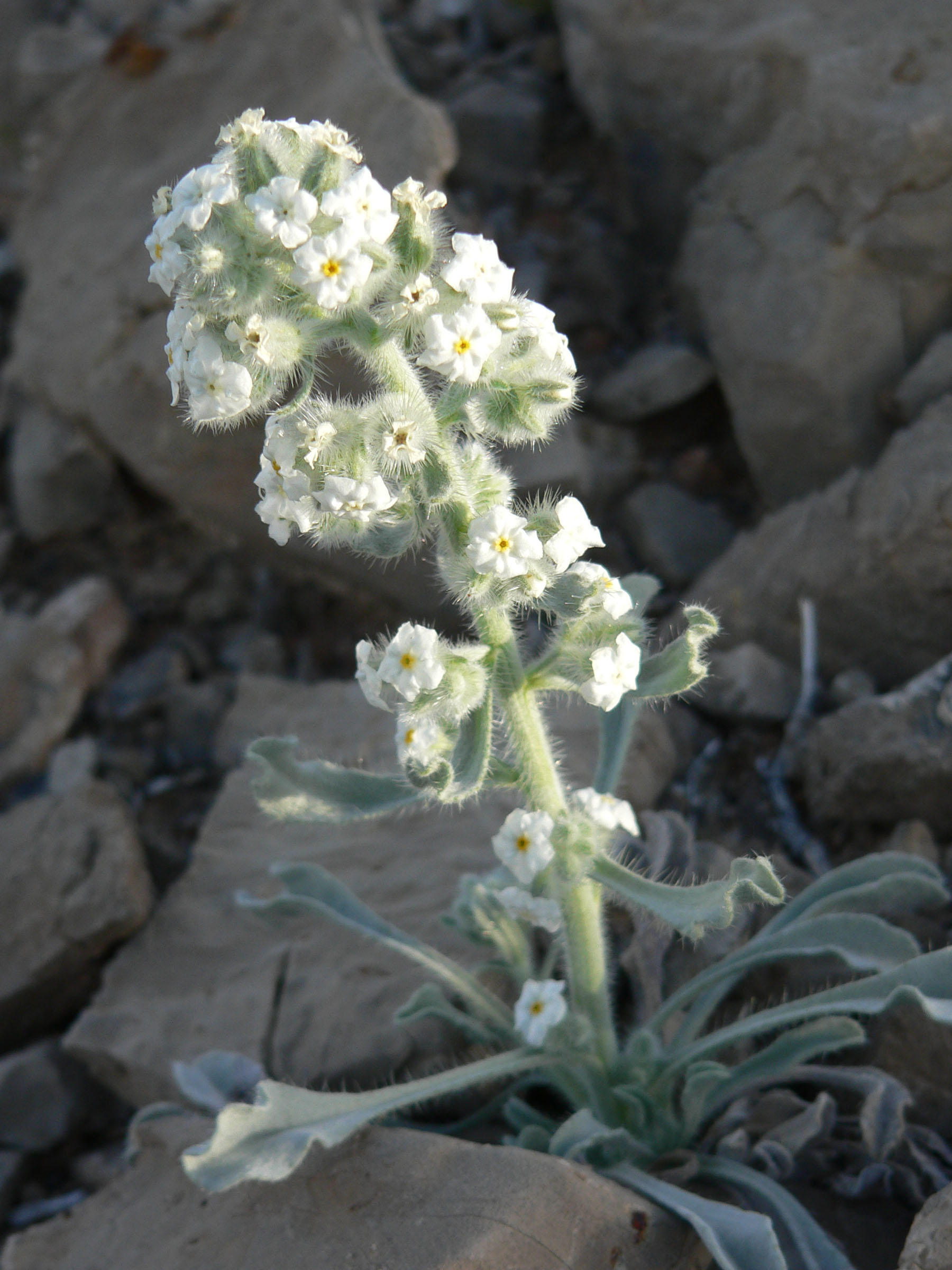
- Oreocarya virginensis in the State Line Hills, 1 km northwest of Primm, Nevada, near the Spring Mountains.

Scientific classification
- Kingdom: Plantae
- Clade: Tracheophytes
- Clade: Angiosperms
- Clade: Eudicots
- Clade: Asterids
- Order: Boraginales
- Family: Boraginaceae
- Genus: Oreocarya
- Species: O. virginensis

Binomial name
- Oreocarya virginensis (M.E.Jones) J.F.Macbr.

Synonyms
- Cryptantha virginensis (M.E.Jones) Payson; Krynitzkia glomerata var. virginensis M.E.Jones

= Oreocarya virginensis =

Virgin River cryptantha

Species of flowering plant

Oreocarya virginensis is a species of wildflower in the family Boraginaceae known by the common name Virgin River cryptantha. This is a small plant native to the southwestern United States (Arizona, California, Nevada and Utah) where it is a common plant in scrub and woodland. It is named for the Virgin River, a tributary of the Colorado River which runs through the region. This Oreocarya is a biennial, or occasionally perennial plant up to 40 centimeters in height. It is coated densely in long white hairs and bristles. The inflorescence is a cylindrical or club-shaped thyrse, packed with white, tubular flowers with flat-faced corollas, and yellow fornices. The fruit is a rough, ridged nutlet.
