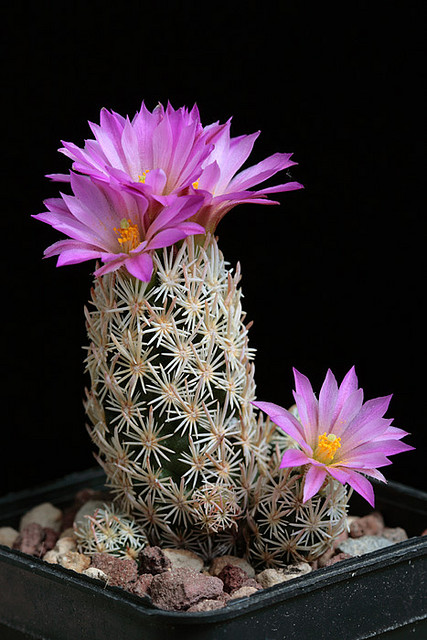

Conservation status
- Critically Imperiled (NatureServe)
- CITES Appendix I

Scientific classification
- Kingdom: Plantae
- Clade: Tracheophytes
- Clade: Angiosperms
- Clade: Eudicots
- Order: Caryophyllales
- Family: Cactaceae
- Subfamily: Cactoideae
- Genus: Pelecyphora
- Species: P. minima

Binomial name
- Pelecyphora minima (Baird) D.Aquino & Dan.Sánchez

Synonyms
- Coryphantha nellieae Coryphantha minima Escobaria nellieae Mammillaria nellieae Escobaria minima

= Pelecyphora minima =

Species of cactus

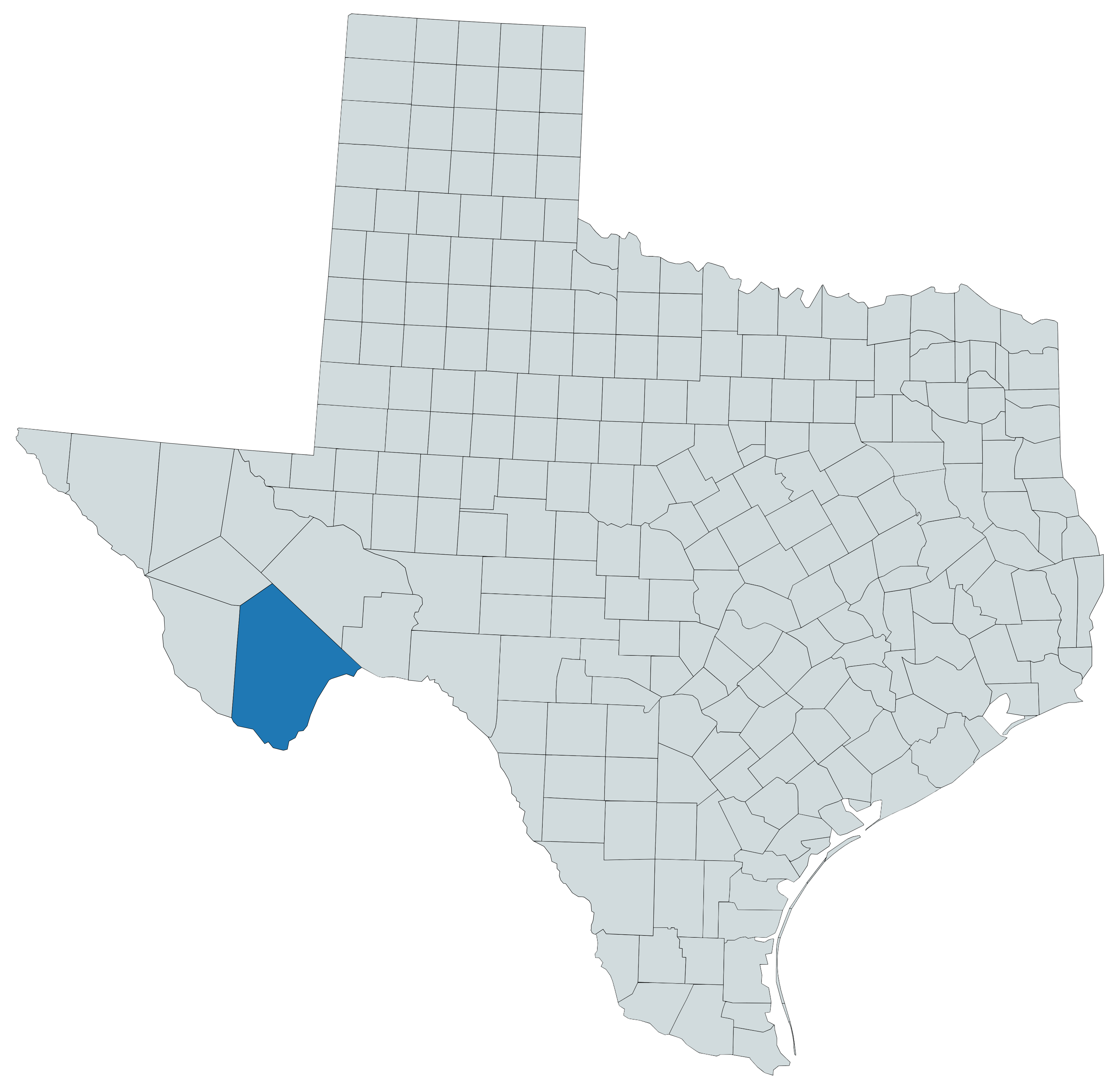
Range of Escobaria minima

Pelecyphora minima (syn. Coryphantha minima, Escobaria minima) is a rare species of cactus known by the common names Nellie cory cactus, Nellie's pincushion cactus, birdfoot cactus, and others. It is a very popular species among cactus collectors. This is one reason why it is a highly endangered species in the wild today. This cactus is found only in Brewster County, Texas, in the United States, where there are three populations remaining near Marathon. The cactus is limited to one outcrop in the Marathon Uplift, where it grows in rocky novaculite soils. It was added to the endangered species list in 1979.

== Description ==
The cactus' stem is mostly beneath the soil surface with the above ground portion a spiny spherical or columnar body no more than 3 centimeters long. It can become larger in cultivation. The longest spines are about half a centimeter long. They are flattened in shape and the tips are not needle-sharp but slightly more rounded. In color they may be tinged tan, yellow, gray, or pink, and sometimes the tips are darker. The flower is roughly 1.5 centimeters long and bright pink to magenta or rose-purple in color. It may be larger than the cactus body itself. The green or yellowish fruit is no more than 6 millimeters long.

== Distribution and habitat ==
The cactus' natural habitat is the Chihuahuan desert scrub, where it grows in mats of Selaginella in rock crevices. It occurs in association with Echinocereus viridiflorus var. davisii, another cactus variety on the endangered species list.

== Taxonomy ==
The first description as Coryphantha minima was published in 1931 by Ralph O. Baird. The specific epithet minima comes from Latin, means 'very small' and refers to the size of the species. David Richard Hunt placed it in the genus Escobaria in 1978. David Aquino & Daniel Sánchez moved the species to Pelecyphora based on phylogenetic studies in 2022. Further nomenclature synonyms is Neobesseya minima (Baird) Lodé (2013) and Escobaria minima (Baird) D.R.Hunt (1978).

== Cultivation ==
This cactus is tiny, interesting, and attractive, and it is a favorite of cactus hobbyists. Collectors have long visited the small patch of land where the cactus occurs. Much of this land is privately owned and not open to surveys or visitors, and the exact abundance of the cactus is not known. The cactus was once found on a ranch in the area, but the owner of the ranch allowed cactus collectors to scour the land for specimens and this species was extirpated from the site. It has also been eliminated from easy-to-reach highway margins where it used to grow.

The plant is propagated by growers today.
