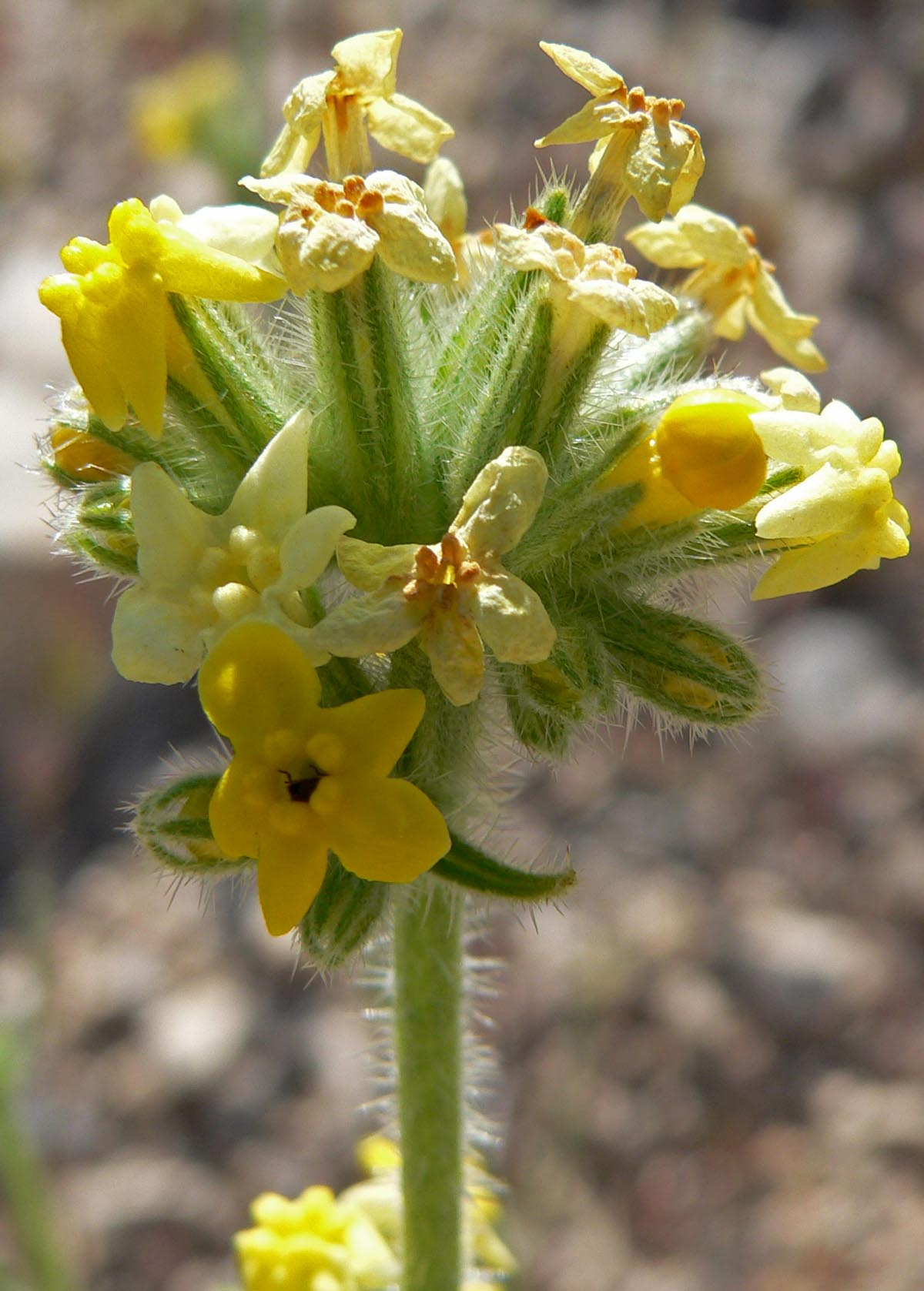

Scientific classification
- Kingdom: Plantae
- Clade: Tracheophytes
- Clade: Angiosperms
- Clade: Eudicots
- Clade: Asterids
- Order: Boraginales
- Family: Boraginaceae
- Genus: Oreocarya
- Species: O. confertiflora

Binomial name
- Oreocarya confertiflora Greene

Synonyms
- Cryptantha confertiflora (Greene) Payson; Oreocarya leucophaea var. confertiflora (Greene) Parish; Oreocarya confertiflora var. flava Brand; Oreocarya confertiflora var. lutescens Brand; Oreocarya lutea Greene ex Brand

= Oreocarya confertiflora =

Species of flowering plant

Oreocarya confertiflora is a species of wildflower in the family Boraginaceae known by the common names Mojave popcorn flower and basin yellow catseye.

== Description ==
It is an erect perennial herb reaching 44 centimetres (17 in) in height. The stems grow from a woody caudex and form a rough clump of hairy, bristly gray-green leaves.

The stems are topped with dense inflorescences of hairy yellow flowers. Each flower is tubular with sepals wrapped around the tube below a flat-faced or curled-back corolla of five lobes. The fruit is a nutlet 3 to 4 millimetres (1/8 to 3/16 in) wide, of which there are typically four.

== Distribution and habitat ==
It is a common desert plant native to the southwestern United States, appearing in dry, rocky areas.
