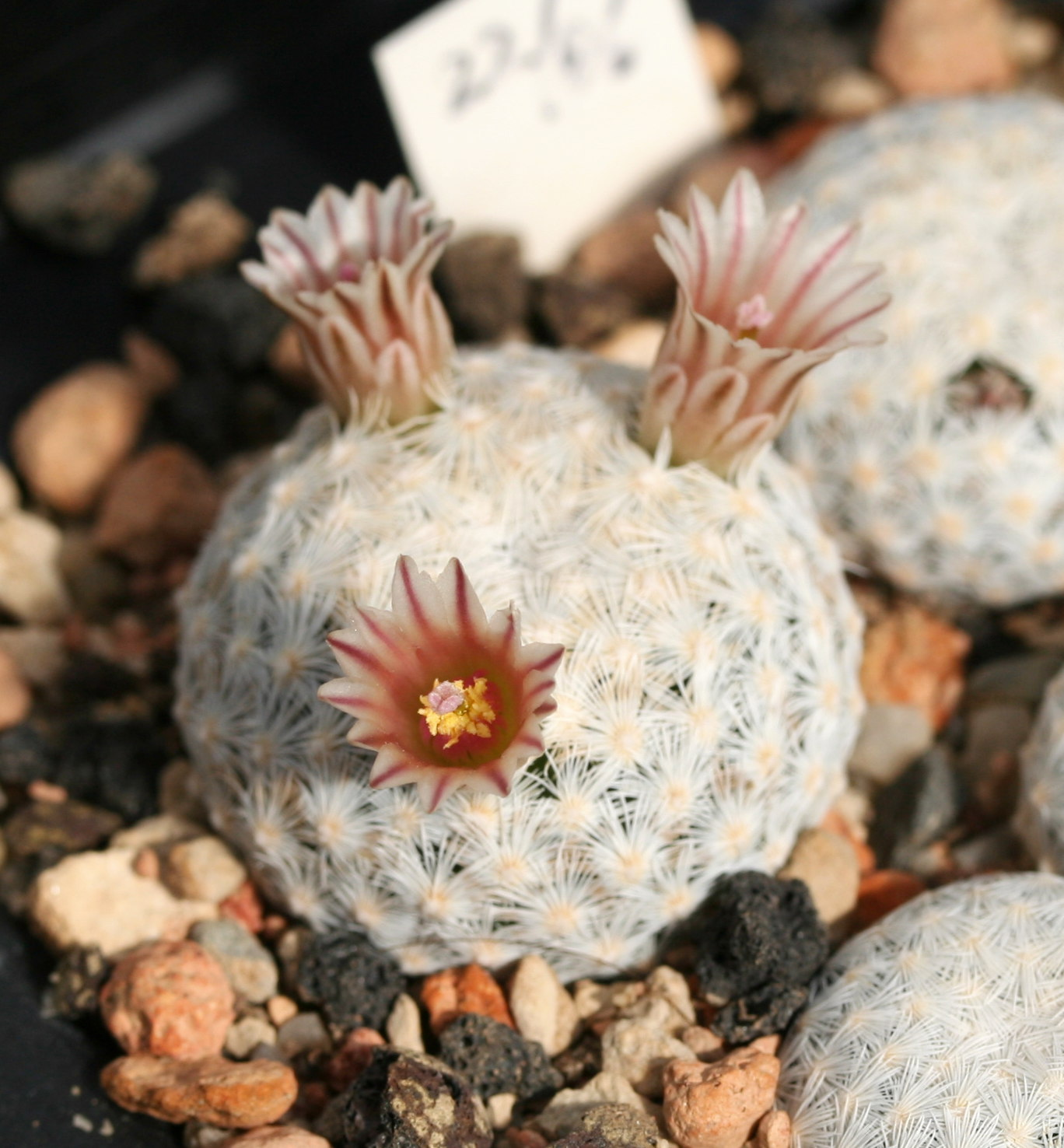

Conservation status
- Least Concern (IUCN 3.1)

Scientific classification
- Kingdom: Plantae
- Clade: Tracheophytes
- Clade: Angiosperms
- Clade: Eudicots
- Order: Caryophyllales
- Family: Cactaceae
- Subfamily: Cactoideae
- Genus: Mammillaria
- Species: M. lasiacantha

Binomial name
- Mammillaria lasiacantha Engelm., 1856

Synonyms
- Mammillaria stella-de-tacubaya Heese

= Mammillaria lasiacantha =

Species of cactus

Mammillaria lasiacantha is a species of cactus in the subfamily Cactoideae, with the common names lacespine nipple cactus, small pincushion cactus, and biznaga de espinas pubescentes (Spanish).

== Distribution ==
This wide-ranging species occurs in the Mexican states of Coahuila and Durango and U.S. states of Arizona and New Mexico, and Texas. It has also been reported from Chihuahua, Nuevo León, San Luis Potosí, Sonora and Zacatecas in Mexico.

The cactus grows on limestone soils of hills and tablelands in desert habitats. It grows at elevations of 700–2,400 metres (2,300–7,900 ft).

== Conservation ==
This cactus is illegally collected and grown as an ornamental plant. It is on the IUCN Red List, and threats are illegal collection for the horticultural trade and possibly land use changes.
