= Oreocarya crassipes =

Conservation status
- Critically Imperiled (NatureServe)

Scientific classification
- Kingdom: Plantae
- Clade: Tracheophytes
- Clade: Angiosperms
- Clade: Eudicots
- Clade: Asterids
- Order: Boraginales
- Family: Boraginaceae
- Genus: Oreocarya
- Species: O. crassipes

Binomial name
- Oreocarya crassipes (I.M.Johnst.) Hasenstab & M.G.Simpson

Synonyms
- Cryptantha crassipes I.M.Johnst.

Species of flowering plant

Oreocarya crassipes is a rare species of flowering plant in the borage family known by the common name Terlingua Creek cat's-eye. It is endemic to Brewster County, Texas, where it is known from only ten populations totaling about 5000 plants. All of the occurrences are within a ten-kilometer radius. This is a federally listed endangered species.

== Description ==
This is a perennial herb producing several erect stems reaching a maximum height around 25 centimeters. There is a clump of basal leaves around the stem bases. The herbage is covered in silvery soft and bristly hairs. The inflorescence is a head of yellow-throated white flowers. The plants are often coated in a sooty black fungus.

== Distribution and habitat ==
This plant grows only on the Fizzle Flat lentil, a small geologic formation in the Terlingua Creek watershed just north of Big Bend National Park. This lentil is a unique expanse of limestone rock which is rich in gypsum and bound with clay. The formation, which locals call a "moonscape", is pale yellow in color because of its mineral makeup and about 50 feet thick. The chalky rock breaks into plates and contains many fossils. The area is very dry and it receives full, hot sunlight. The lentil is almost totally devoid of plant life; this species and other hardy plants, such as Castilleja elongata and Lycium berberioides, occur around the edge of the lentil.

The rare plant is limited to a specific substrate. The area is affected by human activity in several ways. The land is all privately owned and unprotected. Off-road vehicles drive on the badlands, which are used both in the mining of bentonite and for access in the grazing of livestock in the area.
