= List of Lamiales of Montana =

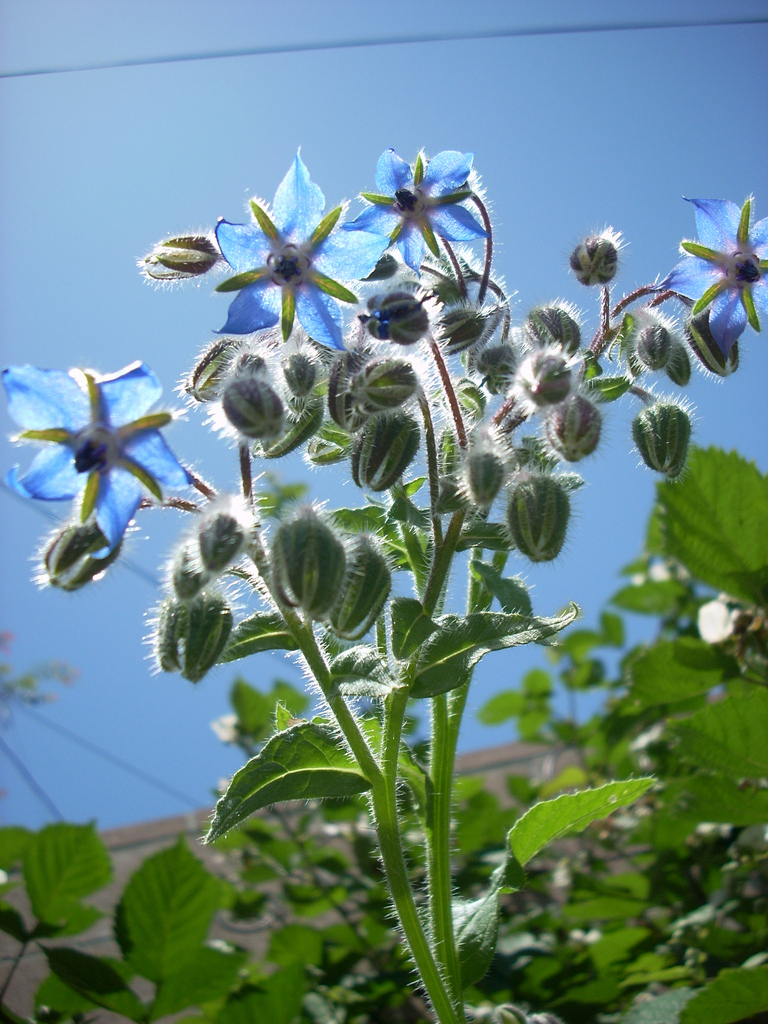
Borago officinalis, common borage

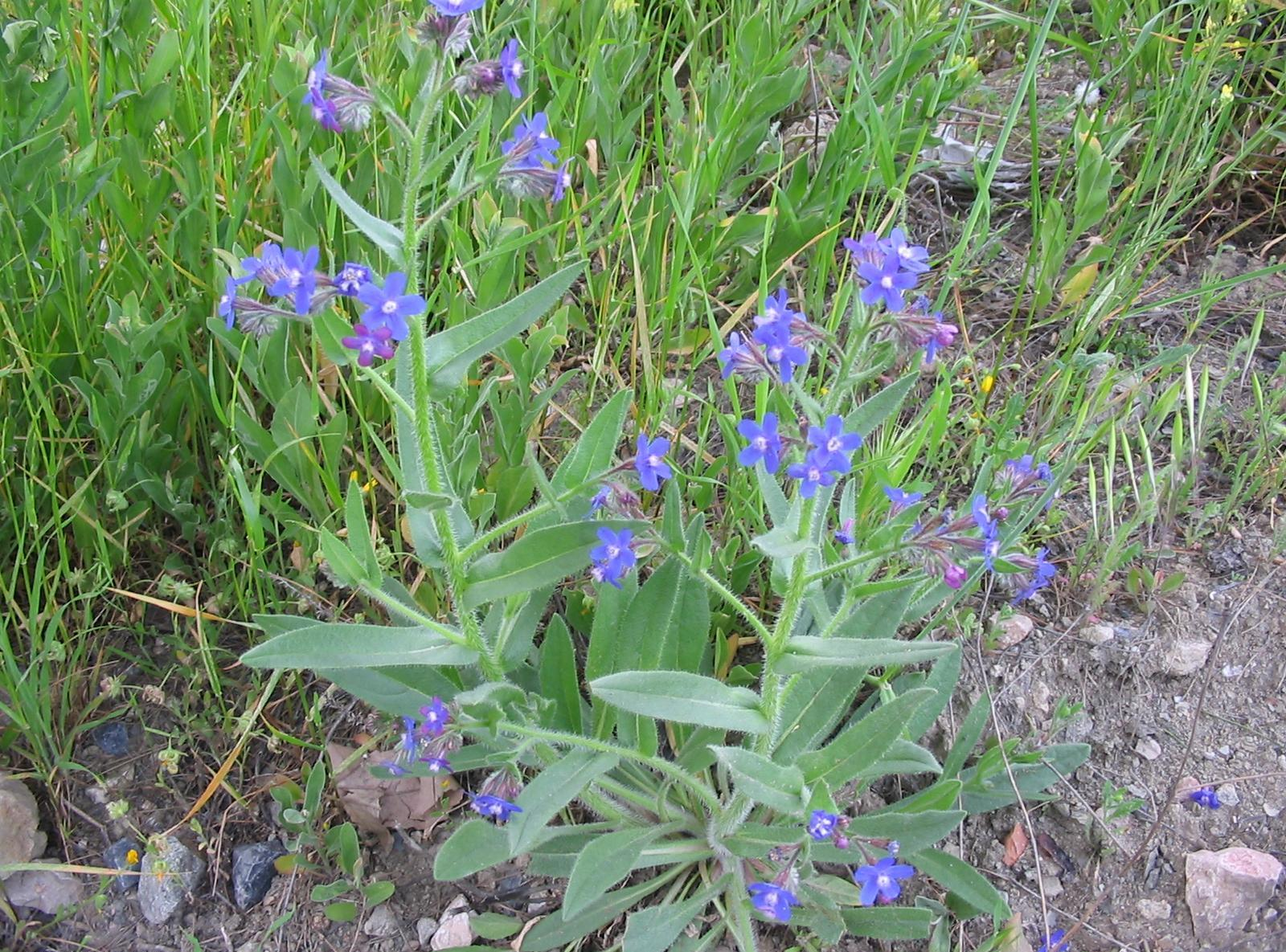
Anchusa azurea, Italian bugloss

There are at least 101 members of the borage, mint and verbena order, Lamiales, found in Montana. Some of these species are exotics (not native to Montana) and some species have been designated as Species of Concern.

== Borage ==
Family: Boraginaceae

- Amsinckia lycopsoides, bugloss fiddle-neck
- Amsinckia menziesii, small-flower fiddle-neck
- Anchusa arvensis, small bugloss
- Anchusa azurea, Italian bugloss
- Anchusa officinalis, common bugloss
- Asperugo procumbens, German madwort
- Borago officinalis, common borage
- Cryptantha affinis, slender cat's-eye
- Cryptantha ambigua, obscure cat's-eye
- Cryptantha cana, wooly cryptantha
- Cryptantha celosioides, cocks-comb cat's-eye
- Cryptantha fendleri, Fendler cat's-eye
- Cryptantha flavoculata, pale yellow cryptantha
- Cryptantha kelseyana, Kelsey's cat's-eye
- Cryptantha minima, little cat's-eye
- Cryptantha scoparia, miner's candle
- Cryptantha sobolifera, Montana cryptantha
- Cryptantha spiculifera, Snake River cat's-eye
- Cryptantha torreyana, Torrey's cat's-eye
- Cryptantha watsonii, Watson's cat's-eye
- Cynoglossum officinale, common hound's-tongue
- Echium vulgare, common viper's-bugloss
- Eritrichium howardii, Howard's forget-me-not
- Eritrichium nanum, alpine forget-me-not
- Hackelia cinerea, gray stickseed
- Hackelia deflexa, northern stickseed
- Hackelia floribunda, Davis Mountain stickseed
- Hackelia micrantha, blue stickseed
- Hackelia patens, Johnston's stickseed
- Heliotropium curassavicum, seaside heliotrope
- Lappula cenchrusoides, great plains stickseed
- Lappula occidentalis, flatspine stickseed
- Lappula squarrosa, bristly stickseed
- Lithospermum arvense, corn-gromwell
- Lithospermum incisum, narrow-leaved puccoon
- Lithospermum ruderale, western gromwell
- Mertensia alpina, alpine bluebells
- Mertensia bella, Oregon bluebells
- Mertensia ciliata, streamside bluebells
- Mertensia lanceolata, prairie bluebells
- Mertensia longiflora, long-flower bluebells
- Mertensia oblongifolia, sagebrush bluebells
- Mertensia paniculata, tall bluebells
- Myosotis arvensis, rough forget-me-not
- Myosotis asiatica, Asian forget-me-not
- Myosotis laxa, small forget-me-not
- Myosotis scorpioides, true forget-me-not
- Myosotis stricta, small-flowered forget-me-not
- Myosotis verna, early forget-me-not
- Onosmodium molle, soft-hairy false gromwell
- Oreocarya humilis (syn. Cryptantha humilis), round-headed cryptantha
- Oreocarya suffruticosa var. setosa (syn. Cryptantha cinerea), James cat's-eye
- Plagiobothrys leptocladus, slender-branched popcorn-flower
- Plagiobothrys scouleri, meadow popcorn-flower
- Symphytum officinale, common comfrey

== Mint ==
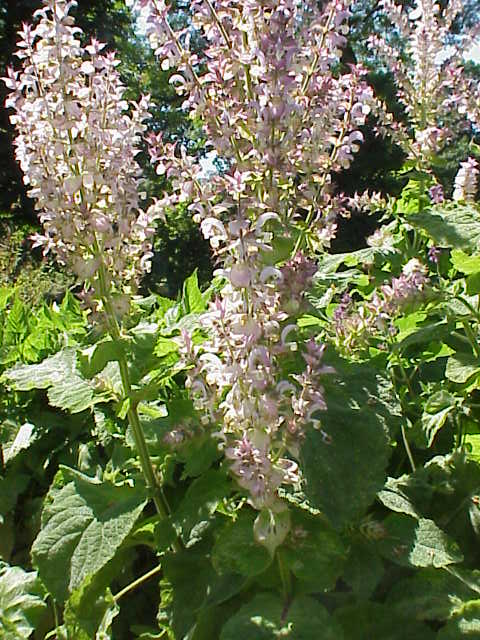
Salvia sclarea

Family: Lamiaceae

- Agastache cusickii, cusick's horsemint
- Agastache foeniculum, lavender hyssop
- Agastache urticifolia, nettle-leaf giant-hyssop
- Ajuga reptans, common bugle
- Dracocephalum parviflorum, American dragonhead
- Dracocephalum thymiflorum, thyme-leaf dragon-head
- Glechoma hederacea, ground-ivy
- Hedeoma drummondii, drummond's false pennyroyal
- Hedeoma hispida, rough false pennyroyal
- Hyssopus officinalis, hyssop
- Lamium amplexicaule, common deadnettle
- Lamium purpureum, purple deadnettle
- Leonurus cardiaca, common mother-wort
- Lycopus americanus, American bugleweed
- Lycopus asper, rough bugleweed
- Lycopus uniflorus, northern bugleweed
- Marrubium vulgare, common hoarhound
- Mentha arvensis, wild mint
- Mentha spicata, spearmint
- Monarda fistulosa, beebalm
- Nepeta cataria, catnip
- Origanum vulgare, oregano
- Physostegia parviflora, purple dragon-head
- Physostegia virginiana, false dragon-head
- Prunella vulgaris, self-heal
- Prunella vulgaris subsp. lanceolata, lance selfheal
- Prunella vulgaris subsp. vulgaris, common selfheal
- Salvia nemorosa, wood sage
- Salvia reflexa, lance-leaved sage
- Salvia sclarea, clary sage
- Salvia × sylvestris, hybrid sage
- Satureja acinos, synonym of Clinopodium acinos, basil thyme
- Satureja douglasii, yerba buena
- Satureja vulgaris, field basil
- Scutellaria galericulata, hooded skullcap
- Stachys palustris, marsh hedge-nettle
- Teucrium canadense, American germander
- Thymus praecox, mother-of-thyme

== Verbena ==
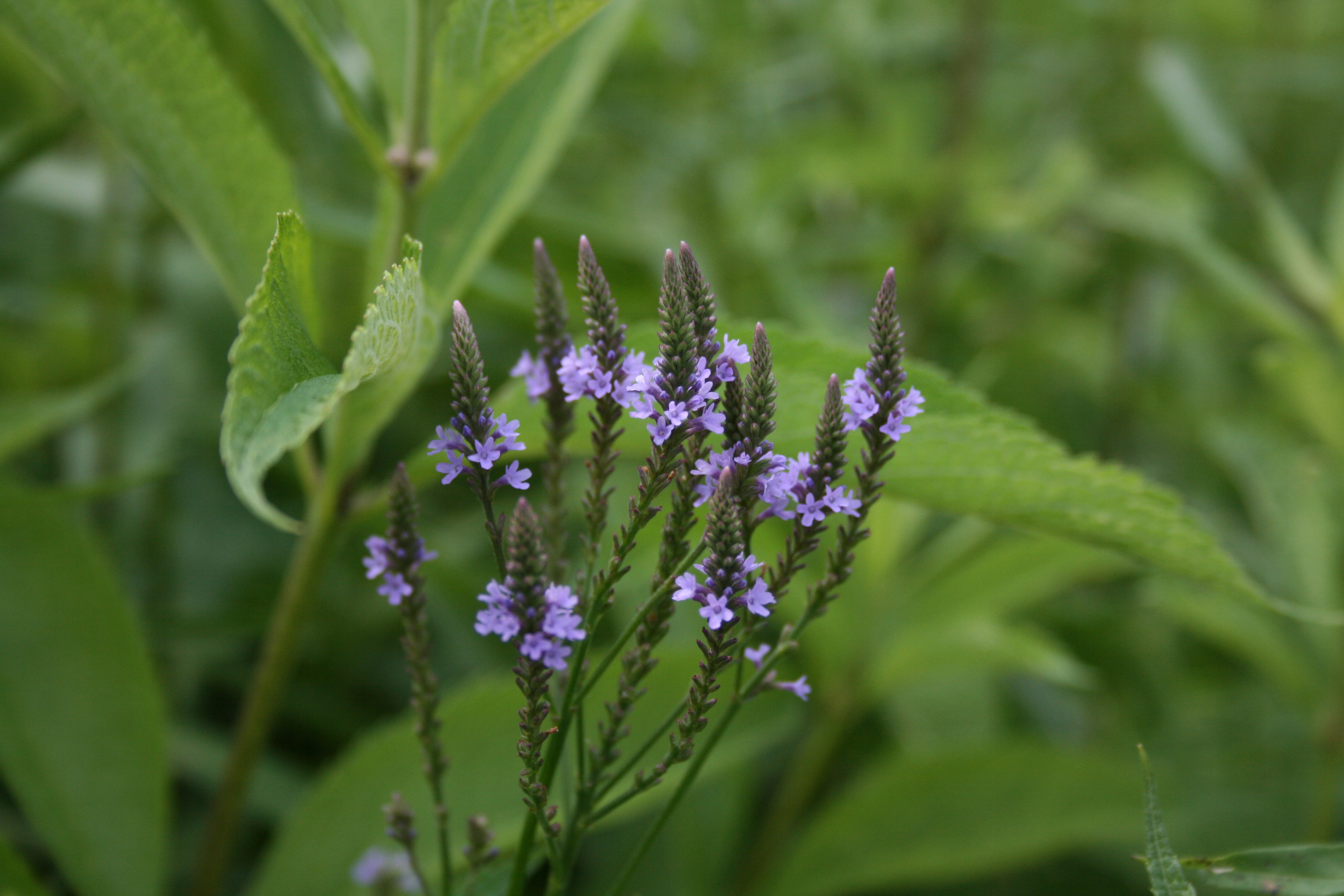
Swamp verbena

Family: Verbenaceae

- Verbena bipinnatifida, Dakota vervain
- Verbena bracteata, large-bract verbena
- Verbena hastata, swamp verbena
- Verbena stricta, hoary verbena

== See also ==
- List of dicotyledons of Montana
- List of Scrophulariales of Montana
