= Chimingbell =

List of plants with the same or similar names

Chimingbell or Chimingbells are a common name of a genus and two species of plant:

- Mertensia, native to much of North America, eastern temperate Asia, and northern Europe
- Mertensia brevistyla, native to New Mexico, Colorado, Wyoming, Idaho, Utah, and Nevada
- Mertensia lanceolata, native to Alberta, Manitoba, and Saskatchewan in Canada and to Colorado, Montana, Nebraska, New Mexico, North Dakota, South Dakota, Utah, and Wyoming in the US
