= Mertensia humilis =

Conservation status
- Vulnerable (NatureServe)

Scientific classification
- Kingdom: Plantae
- Clade: Tracheophytes
- Clade: Angiosperms
- Clade: Eudicots
- Clade: Asterids
- Order: Boraginales
- Family: Boraginaceae
- Genus: Mertensia
- Species: M. humilis

Binomial name
- Mertensia humilis Rydb.

Synonyms
- Mertensia alpina var. humilis

Plant species in the family

Mertensia humilis is a species of plant in the borage family that grows in areas of Wyoming and Colorado in the western United States. In 2023 the species was rated as vulnerable to extinction.

== Description ==
Mertensia humilis is a perennial plant with a woody taproot. Its stems range in height from 4 to 20 centimeters, growing straight upwards or leaning outwards at an angle. Plants have both basal leaves, ones that spring directly from the base of the plant, and cauline leaves, one attached to the stems. The leaves are hairless and can have small pimple-like structures on the surface. The basal leaves are oblong-ovate to oblong-lanceolate, egg shaped somewhat rectangular to spear head shaped but somewhat rectangular. The leaves on the stems are linear-oblong to lanceolate-oblong in shape with bases that attach directly to the main stem or nearly so.

The inflorescences are crowded with blue flowers. Each flower is a narrow bell shape 7–8 millimeters long, with the enclosed tube portion 3–6 mm long. The fruits are nutlets with a rough surface, 2.5 3.5 mm long.

== Taxonomy ==
Mertensia humilis was scientifically described by Per Axel Rydberg in 1909. He described it from a type specimen collected by Aven Nelson on 2 June 1900 from Sand Creek in Albany County, Wyoming. Prior to Rydberg's description specimens were often identified as Mertensia alpina. The species has just one synonym from its description as a variety of Mertensia alpina by James Francis Macbride in 1916. It is classified as part of the Mertensia genus in the family Boraginaceae.

=== Names ===
The species is known by the common name Rocky Mountain bluebells though it may also be known by the common name languid ladies like Mertensia ciliata.

== Range and habitat ==
Most of the natural range of Mertensia humilis is in Wyoming extending north to south across Johnson, Natrona, Carbon, and Albany, counties. In Colorado it is only found in two northern counties, Larimer and Jackson. In Wyoming there are 40 known occurrences and 25 other places where it has become locally extinct. In Colorado there are five occurrences where the species has been recently observed and three more where they had not been seen in the 20 years prior to 2020. It grows at elevations of 2,000 to 2,800 meters (6,400 to 9,100 ft).

The species grows on in the sagebrush steppe and also in open woodlands in Wyoming.

=== Conservation ===
In 2023 NatureServe evaluated Mertensia humilis as globally vulnerable (G3). They also rated it vulnerable (S3) in the state of Wyoming and critically imperiled (S1) in Colorado. When writing about the species in 1937 Louis Otho Williams wrote, "Although M. humilis seems to be restricted in range, within that area it is extremely common. The truncated summit of the Laramie Mountains between Cheyenne and Laramie is literally blue with the plant when it is in flower."
