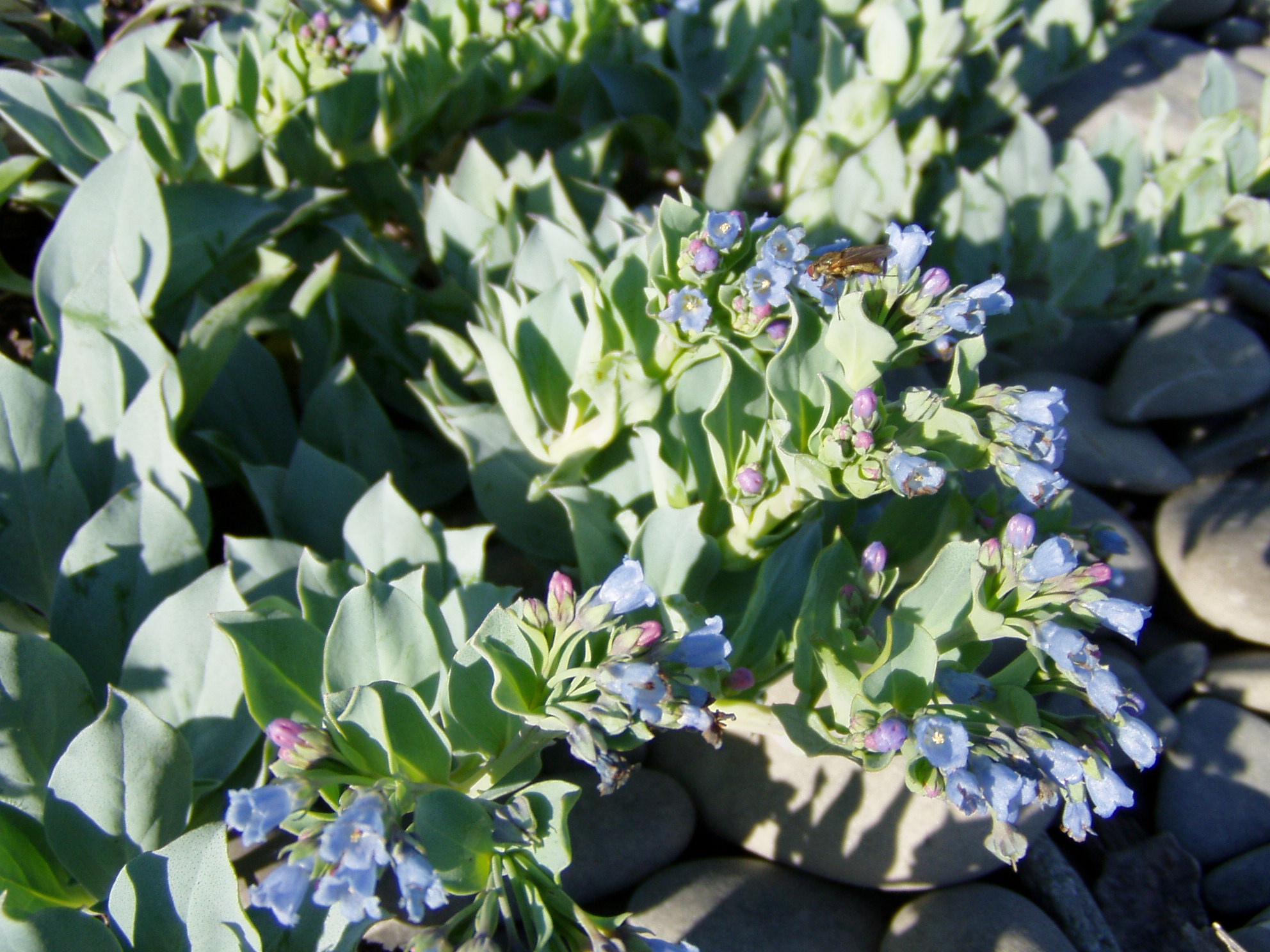

Scientific classification
- Kingdom: Plantae
- Clade: Embryophytes
- Clade: Tracheophytes
- Clade: Spermatophytes
- Clade: Angiosperms
- Clade: Eudicots
- Clade: Asterids
- Order: Boraginales
- Family: Boraginaceae
- Genus: Mertensia
- Species: M. maritima

Binomial name
- Mertensia maritima (L.) Gray

= Mertensia maritima =

Species of flowering plant

Mertensia maritima is a species of flowering plant in the borage family, and is known by the common names oyster leaf in North America, oyster plant in the British Isles, and sea bluebells.

It is restricted to gravelly sea shores, usually within reach of the highest winter tides in the Northern Hemisphere, reaching north to the northern parts of Canada, Greenland and Svalbard.

It is a perennial herb producing a stem approaching 50 centimeters in maximum length. The inflorescence forms a cluster of flowers which are first reddish, and later bright blue.

== Description ==
Mertensia maritima is known as the oyster leaf or oyster plant because it gives off a faint smell of mushrooms and when eaten it tastes vaguely of oysters. The chemical that gives this plant the oyster-like odour when its leaves are crushed is dimethyl sulphide, a compound that is noted for being a major part of the odour profile of raw oysters. It is native to Britain and Northern Europe; however, populations in the British Isles are decreasing. There are two other varieties that exist:

- M. maritima var. tenella is found in Canada and Spitzbergen
- M. maritima var. asiatica is found in Alaska and Northeastern Asia

This plant grows on sand or shingle beaches where the ground can be siliceous or calcareous, and contains humus from decaying seaweed. It mainly grows in a sub-Arctic climate and is exposed to very cold temperatures, waves that crash on the shore and strong winds. Since the plant grows in a cold climate, the seeds remain dormant. Skarpaas and Stabbetorp noted that a cold period (about 2 °C (36 °F)) was needed to break this dormancy.
