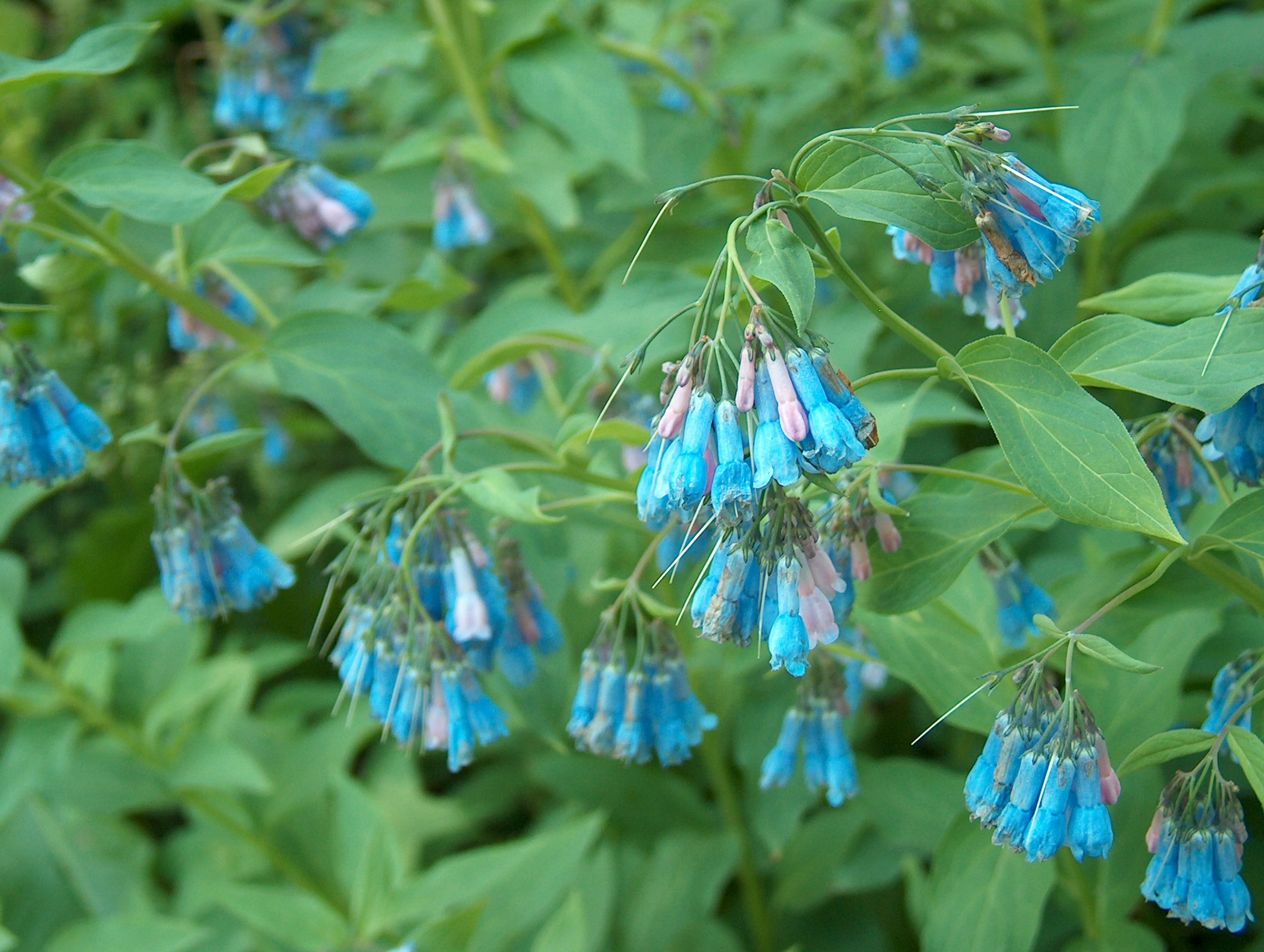

Scientific classification
- Kingdom: Plantae
- Clade: Tracheophytes
- Clade: Angiosperms
- Clade: Eudicots
- Clade: Asterids
- Order: Boraginales
- Family: Boraginaceae
- Genus: Mertensia
- Species: M. sibirica

Binomial name
- Mertensia sibirica (L.) G.Don

= Mertensia sibirica =

Species of flowering plant

Mertensia sibirica, commonly known as Japanese bluebells or Siberian bluebells, is a species of flowering plant belonging to the family Boraginaceae. Originally discovered by Carolus Linnaeus, who named it Pulmonaria sibirica, this plant is found, as its name implies, in Eastern Siberia and northern China. After review of the plant's morphology, its taxonomic position was changed to Mertensia sibirica by botanist and plant collector George Don, who put forth the notion of the change, which was eventually accepted, most likely due to the striking resemblance to the related species in the Americas like Mertensia virginica, or Virginia bluebells.

== Description ==
The Japanese bluebell is a nectariferous and herbaceous perennial plant with smooth, elliptical or simple, entire, heart-shaped leaves that grow up to 8 x 5 in and have blue-green coloration. Starting from the ground up, they are rhizomatous with the rhizomes transversely spreading and a singular, glabrous, sulcate stem that can grow up to 60 cm tall and only branches the inflorescences. The basal leaves are petiolate with a leaf blade that is ovate to ovate-oblong, fleshy and abaxially glaucous with convex dots, and the base of the leaves are broadly cuneate or somewhat cordate with a short acuminate apex; the lateral veins are arcuate and raised abaxially. The stem leaves are sessile, elliptic to linear-oblong with an attenuate base and an acute to acuminate apex.There are usually 2 or 3 terminal cymes that become paniculate, glabrous and few flowered along a curved rachis.The abundant, waxy flowers have a purplish-blue bell-shape, and grow up to 1 inch in length. The flowers are widely spaced with the calyx campanulate and 5-parted nearly to the base, lobes that are narrowly ovate to linear-ovate and an obtuse apex. The corolla is blue, the smooth throat appendages fold transversely, the lib is slightly shorter than the tube, the lobes are slightly spreading and broadly ovate with the margin being entire or repand, the apex being obtuse, and the veins distinct. The stamens are inserted below the appendages with strap-shaped filaments and the linear-oblong anthers are sparsely pubescent with a divergent base and an obtuse apex. The filiform style is exserted from the corolla with a discoid stigma. The nutlets are white, subreniform and slightly reticulate-wrinkled and glabrous. The entire plant can grow between 12 and 18 inches tall and has an 18 to 24 inch spread across the ground. This species does not typically tolerate full shade and does not go dormant after flowering.

== Habitat ==
This rare, relict, hemicryptophyte is endemic to hillside meadows and forests in eastern Siberia and northern China. It grows in isolated locations with a special microclimate of floating warm fogs along the north-western border of its habitat, in the Lower Yenisei. Along the south-eastern border of its habitat, it grows in the forest communities of the Chikoy Range, which is located on the border between the Chita region and Buryatia. This species grows within relict taiga forests, grassy tundras, in meadows, along forest edges, pebble beaches, along streams, and on moist mountains. This peculiar species relates to its high demand for moist substrates.

== Conservation ==
This taxon was not included in the IUCN red list and is not protected by law, however its natural habitat from which it is found is listed on the IUCN red list as a Category V protected landscape, for which an entire body of land is covered by an explicit natural conservation plan. This species has a lectotype designated at the Linnean Society of London Herbarium in U.K., England, London, LINN. This species was newly introduced to the Czech Republic as a non-native species.
