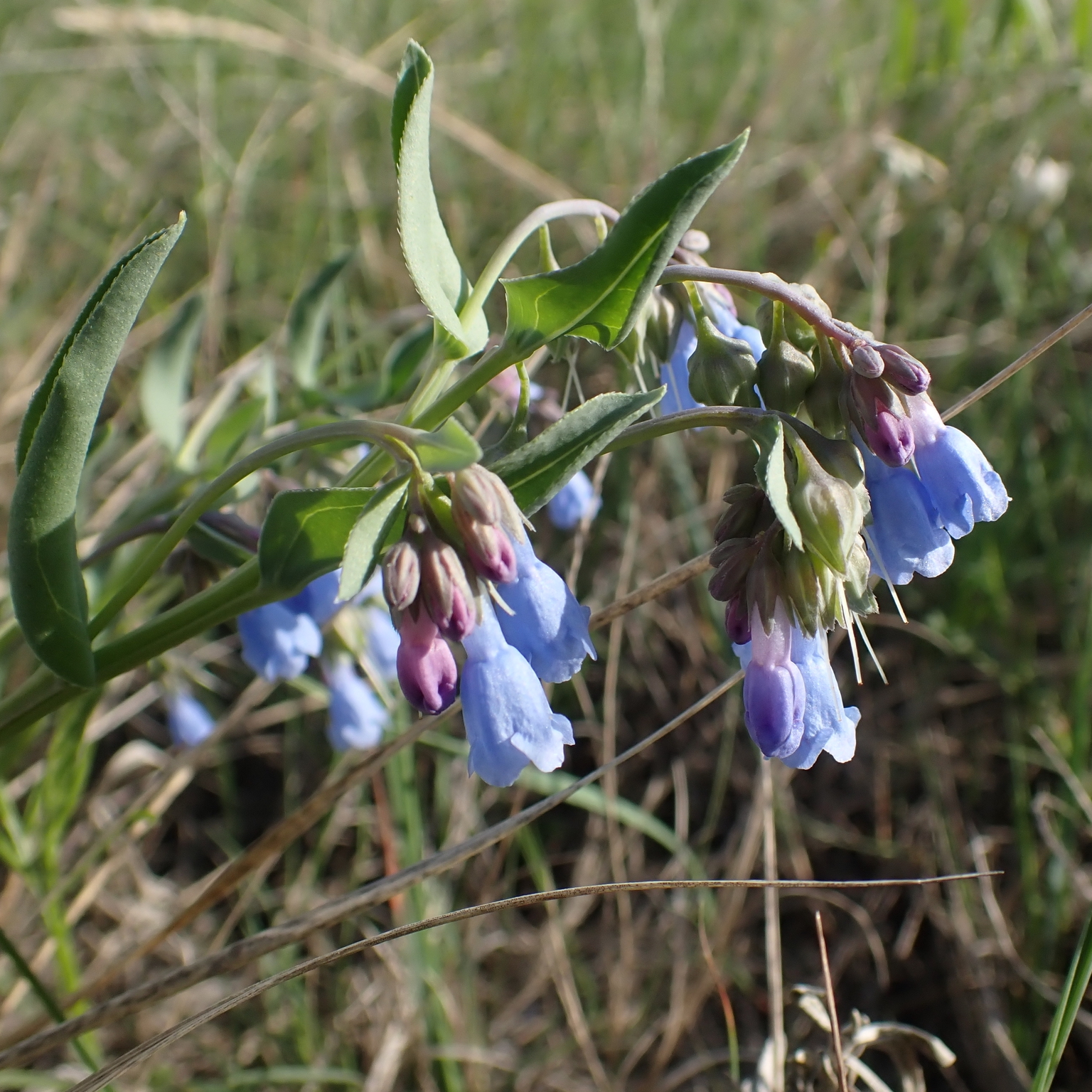

Conservation status
- Secure (NatureServe)

Scientific classification
- Kingdom: Plantae
- Clade: Tracheophytes
- Clade: Angiosperms
- Clade: Eudicots
- Clade: Asterids
- Order: Boraginales
- Family: Boraginaceae
- Genus: Mertensia
- Species: M. lanceolata

Binomial name
- Mertensia lanceolata (Pursh) DC.

Varieties
- Mertensia lanceolata var. coriacea (A.Nelson) L.C.Higgins & S.L.Welsh; Mertensia lanceolata var. lanceolata; Mertensia lanceolata var. secundorum (Cockerell) Cockerell

Synonyms
- List: Casselia lanceolata (Pursh) Dumort. (1822); Cerinthodes lanceolatum (Pursh) Kuntze (1891); Lithospermum lanceolatum (Pursh) Sweet (1830); Lithospermum marginatum Spreng. (1824); Mertensia alpina A.Gray (1862); Mertensia clokeyi Osterh. (1919); Mertensia coriacea A.Nelson (1902); Mertensia linearis Greene (1897); Mertensia marginata G.Don (1837); Mertensia media Osterh. (1917); Mertensia micrantha A.Nelson (1907); Mertensia papillosa Greene (1898); Mertensia secundorum Cockerell (1907); Pulmonaria lanceolata Pursh (1813); Pulmonaria marginata Nutt. (1818)

= Mertensia lanceolata =

Species of plant in the borage family

Mertensia lanceolata, known as prairie bluebells, lance-leaved bluebells, lance-leaved lungwort, and narrow-leaved languid ladies is a species of flowering plant native to the Rocky Mountains and areas of the northern Great Plains in western North America. A herbaceous perennial it has blue-green leaves alternately arranged on its smooth flowering stalk. Its flower buds are pink-purple and become blue as they open.

== Description ==
Mertensia lanceolata is a variable species with flowering individuals typically growing 10–45 cm in height.

The species is found in Rocky Mountain habitats from the plains to alpine areas. The leaves are blue-green due to the waxy coating with a prominent center vein. Immature plants will have a few that spring directly from the ground (basal leaves) that are halfway between egg shaped and a lance head shaped (ovate-lanceolate). They may be on short stalks that are longer than the leaf or without any leaf stem (sessile). Older plants will have leaves that attach to the flower stalk alternately with a much narrower leaf, either lanceolate or somewhat more rectangular (oblong-lanceolate) and may or may not have basal leaves.

The leaves or flower stalks arise from the large taproot. Flowering stalks lean outwards at an angle with multiple flowers hanging downwards from the top of the stalk. The flowers are five fused petals forming a short trumpet. The flower buds are pink in color, while the flowers are very often a pale sky-blue, but may also be nearly white or a deep blue color. The united tube of the flower is 3–7 millimeters in length. The inflorescence is dense with flowers, but is more widely spaced as it becomes older, paniculate in character.

Flowering lasts for about a month, but may continue longer when conditions are favorable. Flowering timing depends on weather and may be from April to August in its native habitat. Mertensia lanceolata becomes dormant by early summer, dying back to its substantial roots.

== Taxonomy ==
Mertensia lanceolata was scientifically described as a new species by the botanist Frederick Traugott Pursh in 1813 with the name Pulmonaria lanceolata. He described the place of collection simply as "In Upper Louisiana," and noted a resemblance of the flowers to those of Pulmonaria paniculata. In 1822 Barthélemy Charles Joseph Dumortier published a description where he moved the species to a new genus named Casselia Dumort., which is now regarded as a synonym of Mertensia, but should not be confused with the accepted genus Casselia Nees & Mart.. In 1830 the botanist Robert Sweet asserted that it should be part of genus Lithospermum. It was correctly identified as part of Mertensia and given its present name by Augustin Pyramus de Candolle in 1846.

As of 2024 it is generally accepted under this name including by Plants of the World Online (POWO), World Flora Online, and by the USDA Natural Resources Conservation Service (PLANTS) database.

=== Varieties ===
As of 2024 there are three varieties of this species that are accepted by POWO. A number of books, including the Flora of Colorado and Flora of the Four Corners Region, list an additional variety named Mertensia lanceolata var. nivalis (S.Watson) L.C.Higgins, but this is regarded as a synonym of Mertensia oblongifolia by POWO.

==== Mertensia lanceolata var. coriacea ====
This variety was first described by Aven Nelson in 1902 as a species named Mertensia coriacea. It was reclassified as a variety by Larry C. Higgins (1936-) and Stanley Larson Welsh (1928-) in 1993. It differs from var. lanceolata by having the sepals nearly divided to the base and having pollen bearing structures (the anthers) that are longer than the stalks that support them (the filaments). It has leaves that smooth on both sides. It is found in four US states, Wyoming, Utah, Colorado, and New Mexico.

==== Mertensia lanceolata var. lanceolata ====
The autonymic variety of Mertensia lanceolata can be distinguished from the other varieties by the sepals not being completely divided to their base and the stalks of the stamens are longer than the pollen structures they support (the anthers). The range of the variety is almost identical to the species as a whole, being found in seven US states and three Canadian provinces.

==== Mertensia lanceolata var. secundorum ====
This variety was described by Theodore D. A. Cockerell in 1907 as a species named Mertensia secundorum, but then reduced to a variety by in a publication in 1918. It has leaves that are covered in bristles on both sides. The PLANTS database shows it as found in Natrona and Converse Counties in Wyoming and having been found in Colorado without a specific location.

=== Names ===
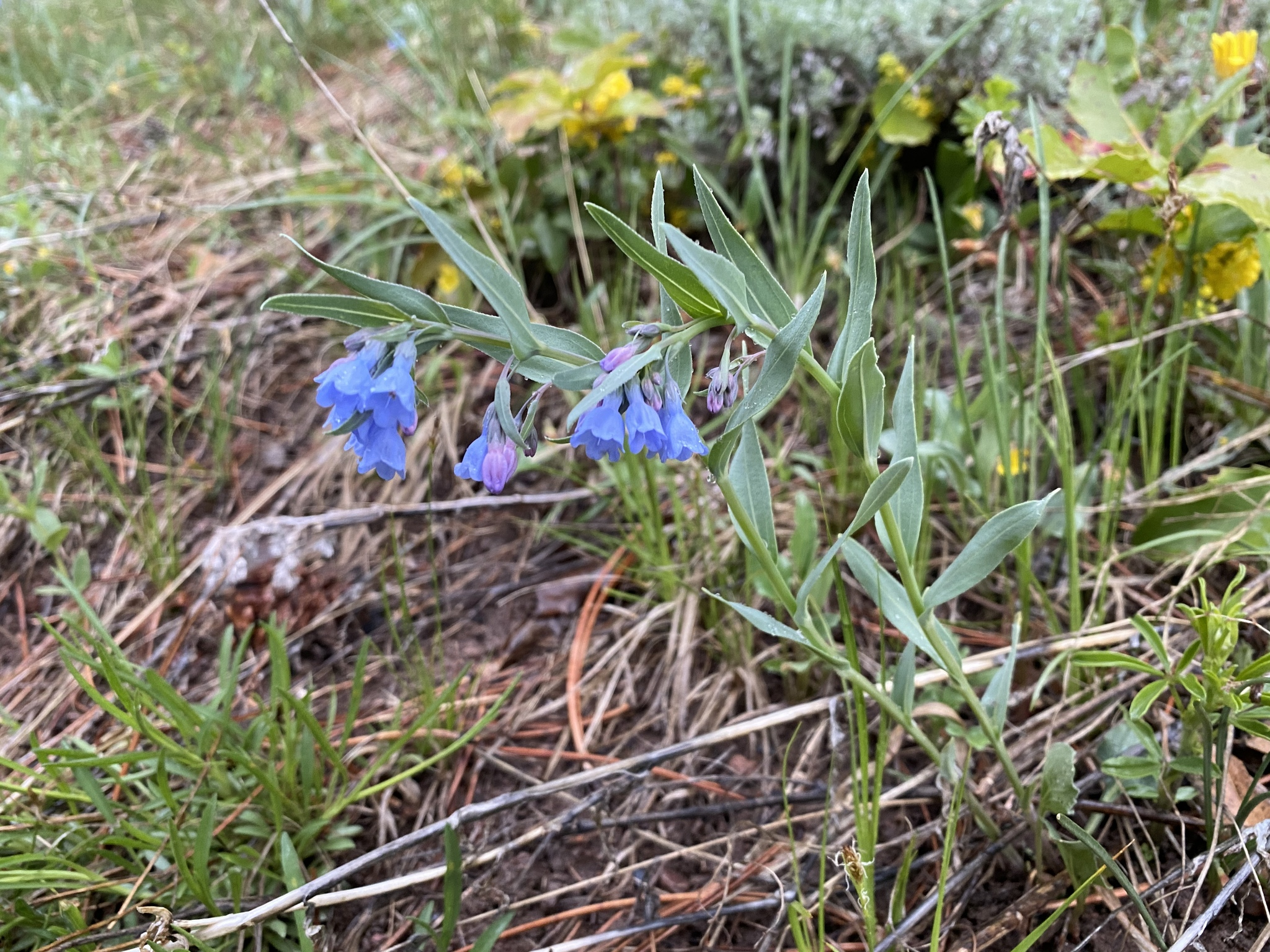
Mertensia lanceolata blooming Boulder County Open Space, Colorado

The scientific name of the species, lanceolata, means "lance shaped" describing the shape of its basal leaves. The species has many common names in English including "prairie bluebells", "lance-leaved bluebells", "lanceleaf chiming bells", "narrow-leaved languid ladies", "lance-leaved lungwort", "lanceleaf mertansia", and "foothill mertensia". They are also sometimes known simply as chimingbells, but this name is applied to other species such as Mertensia brevistyla and the whole Mertensia genus.

== Range and habitat ==
Mertensia lanceolata grows in the Rocky Mountains from northern New Mexico in the south to Alberta in Canada, including Colorado, Wyoming, Utah, and Montana. It also grows in some states and provinces to the east of the Rockies, Manitoba and Saskatchewan in Canada, and Nebraska, North Dakota, and South Dakota in the United States.

They grow in a variety of habitats including in forests, the edges of woodlands, stream banks, prairies, rocky hillsides, and alpine tundra.

=== Conservation ===
NatureServe has evaluated the species as globally secure (G5), but its status has not been reviewed since 1988. At that time they found the species to be vulnerable (S3) in Saskatchewan and imperiled (S2) in Alberta, Manitoba, and Nebraska. They assessed it as apparently secure (S4) in Wyoming and did not evaluate it at the state level for the rest of its range.

== Ecology ==
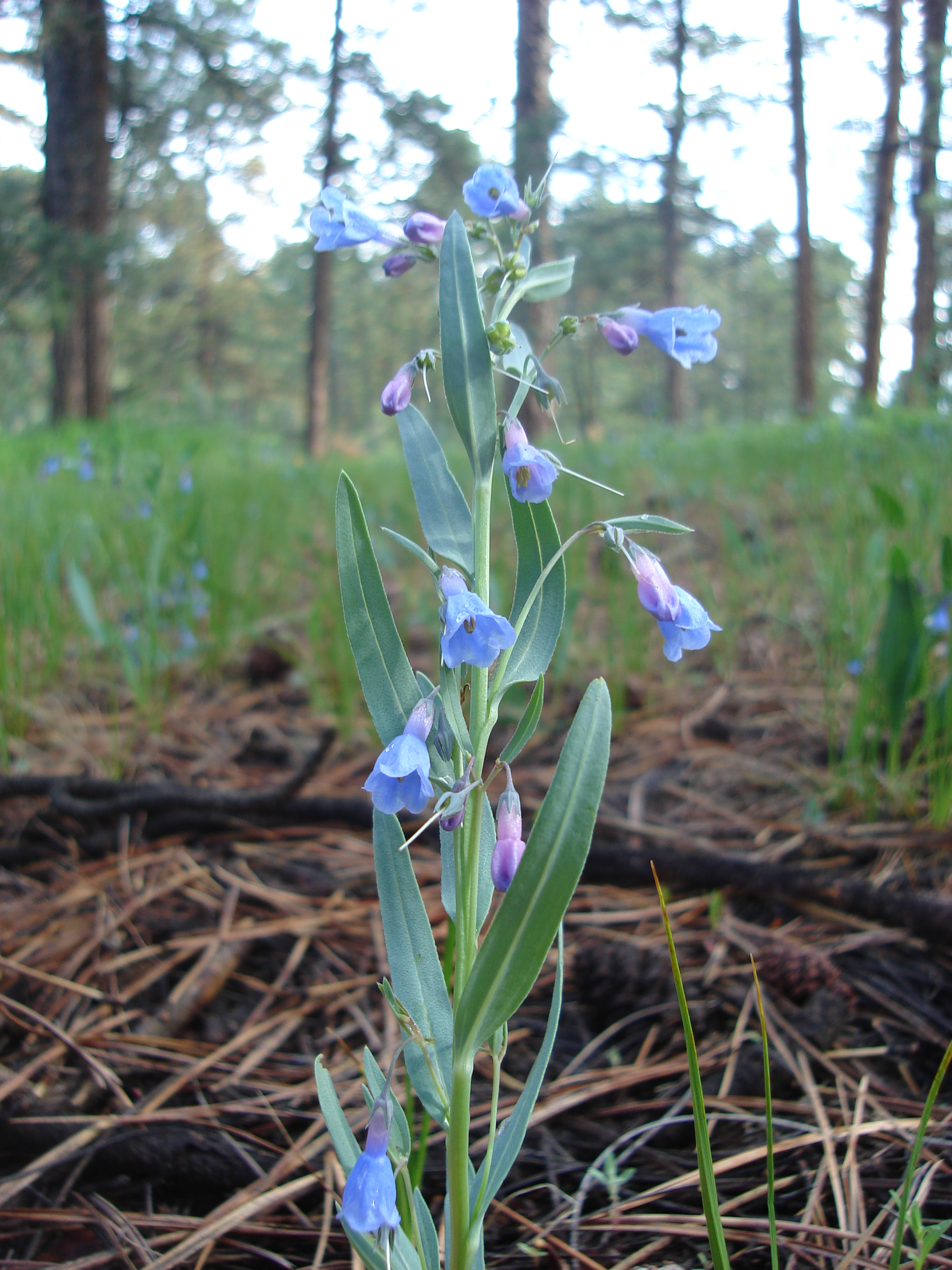
Mertensia lanceolata in a ponderosa pine forest

In a study of the forest after the Hayman Fire in Colorado, similar numbers of Mertensia lanceolata plants were found before and after the fire. The species is associated with a history of low-intensity forest fires in ponderosa pine forests at sites along the Front Range in Colorado. Between 1981 and 1996 it expanded from being found in the lower mountain and upper montane forest life zones in Colorado, into the alpine tundra without colonizing the subalpine zone in between.

== Cultivation ==
Narrow-leaved languid ladies are valued by wildflower gardeners for its dainty vibrant blue flower display and long season of blooming when moisture is good. They grow in either well draining or clay soils and is tolerant of limestone derived soils. Plants will live for many years when given space to grow its deep, branching taproot. It is also rated as with the lowest possible flammability for landscaping to create defensible space by Colorado State University Extension. A germination study of languid ladies found that the species exhibits very little need for cold stratification with 70% of seeds sprouting after four weeks at 21 °C (70 °F), though germination was accelerated by being held at 4.5 °C (40.1 °F) for three months before planting. After just two days the cold treated seeds had 30% germination rates. The species is winter hardy to USDA zone 4. Plants are rarely available from commercial growers and the seeds are somewhat rare even from wildflower seed exchanges.
