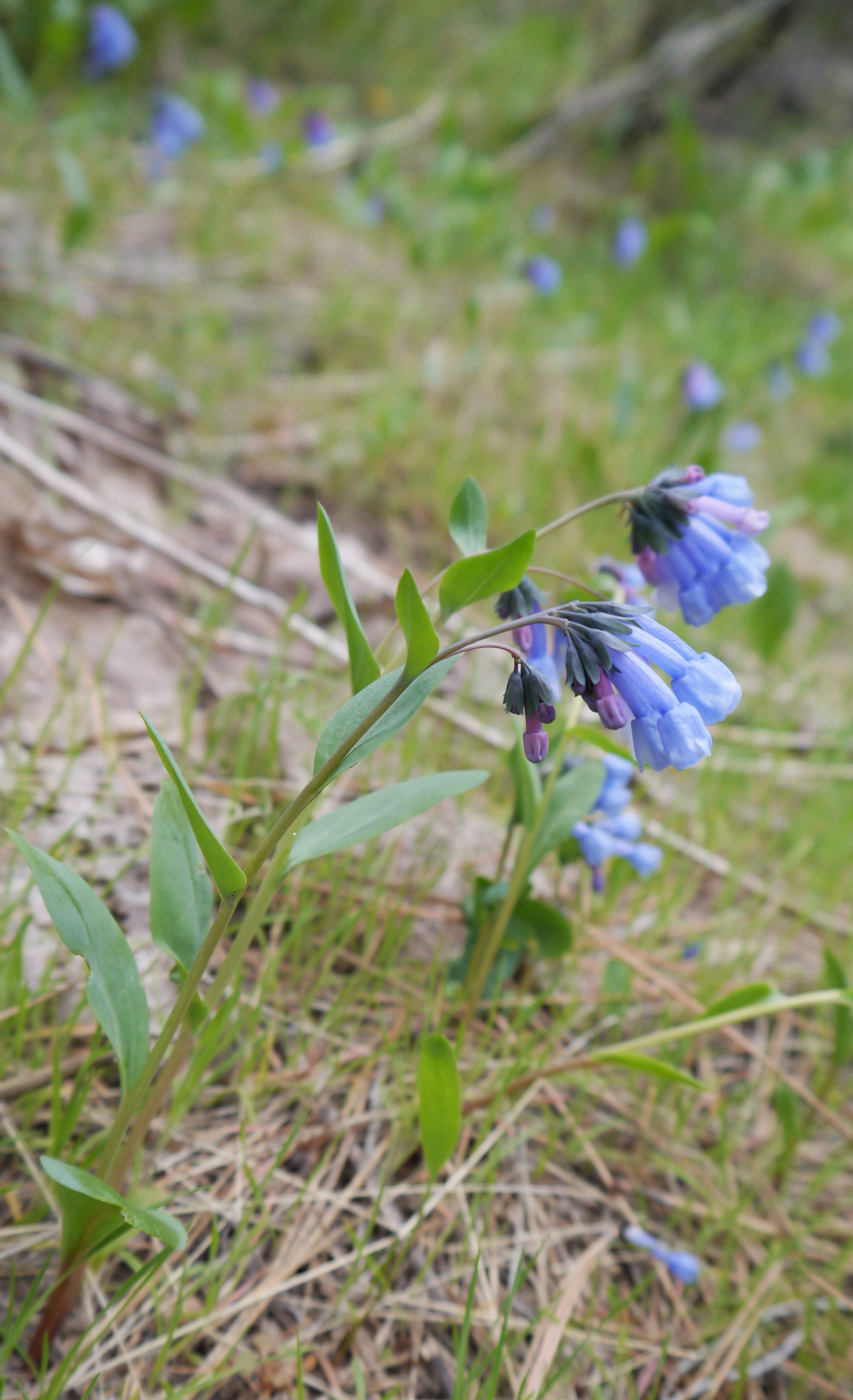
- Mertensia longiflora near Cashmere, Chelan County Washington

Conservation status
- Secure (NatureServe)

Scientific classification
- Kingdom: Plantae
- Clade: Embryophytes
- Clade: Tracheophytes
- Clade: Spermatophytes
- Clade: Angiosperms
- Clade: Eudicots
- Clade: Asterids
- Order: Boraginales
- Family: Boraginaceae
- Genus: Mertensia
- Species: M. longiflora

Binomial name
- Mertensia longiflora Greene

Synonyms
- Mertensia horneri; Mertensia pulchella

= Mertensia longiflora =

Plant species in the borage family

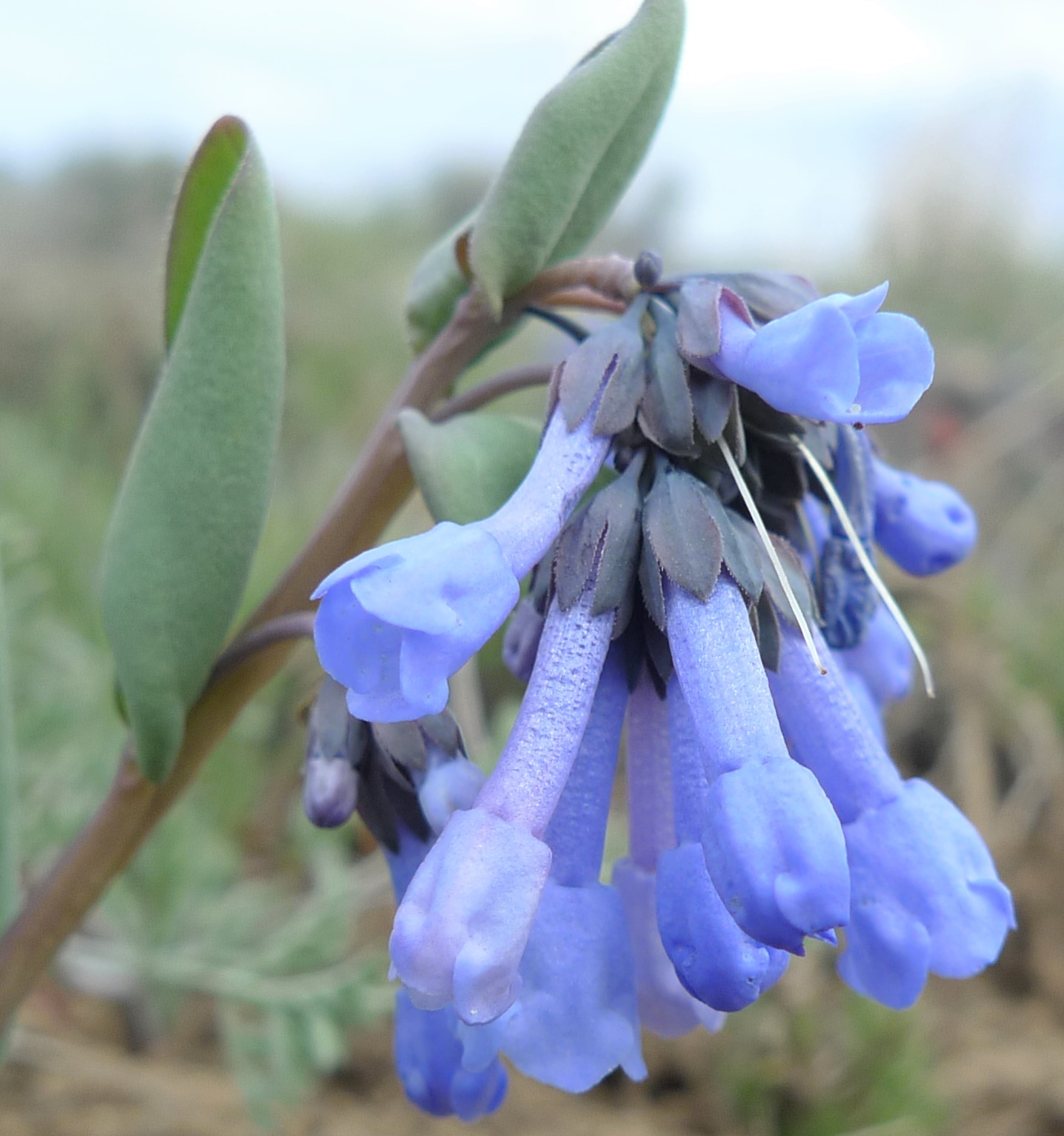
Mertensia longiflora on Badger Mountain, Douglas County Washington

Mertensia longiflora is a species of flowering plant in the borage family known by the common names small bluebells and long bluebells.

== Description ==
It is a perennial herb growing from branched and tuberous roots in the form of a caudex. The erect stem averages about 18 centimetres (7 1/8 in) in height. There are a few oval to lance-shaped leaves.

The inflorescence is a dense, often crowded cluster of hanging tubular flowers which are fused at the base and expand into lobed and bell-like mouths. They are generally bright blue, but may be lavender to pinkish to nearly white, and measure up to 2.5 cm long.

== Taxonomy ==
Mertensia longiflora was scientifically described and named by Edward Lee Greene in 1898. It is classified in the genus Mertensia within the Boraginaceae family. The species has no accepted varieties, but has two among its six heterotypic synonyms.

Table of Synonyms
Name	Year	Rank
Mertensia horneri Piper	1906	species
Mertensia longiflora f. alba B.Boivin	1966	form
Mertensia longiflora var. horneri (Piper) J.F.Macbr.	1916	variety
Mertensia longiflora var. pulchella (Piper) J.F.Macbr.	1916	variety
Mertensia pulchella Piper	1906	species
Mertensia pulchella subsp. glauca Piper	1906	subspecies

== Range ==
Long bluebells are native to western Canada and the western United States. In Canada it grows in Alberta and British Columbia. In the US it grows in Washington, Oregon, Idaho, Montana, California, and Nevada.
