= Mertensia brevistyla =

- North of Battle Mountain, Medicine Bow National Forest, Carbon County, Wyoming

Conservation status
- Apparently Secure (NatureServe)

Scientific classification
- Kingdom: Plantae
- Clade: Tracheophytes
- Clade: Angiosperms
- Clade: Eudicots
- Clade: Asterids
- Order: Boraginales
- Family: Boraginaceae
- Genus: Mertensia
- Species: M. brevistyla

Binomial name
- Mertensia brevistyla S.Watson

Synonyms
- Mertensia congesta; Mertensia fusiformis

Plant species in the forget-me-not family

Mertensia brevistyla, also known as shortstyle bluebells or Wasatch bluebell, is a flowering plant of the forget-me-not family from the western United States and most often found in western Colorado and northern Utah.

== Description ==
Shortstyle bluebells are a herbaceous plant that often grow many stems, but can have just one, from a short, but thick taproot, that is fusiform, resembling a spindle because it tapers at both ends. The stems are can be 10 to 40 centimeters (4–16 in) tall, but usually do not exceed 30 cm (12 in). They grow straight upwards from the base or lean outwards before growing upwards, and can be hairless to somewhat sparsely strigose, having straight hairs all pointing in the same direction. New stems begin to emerge soon after the snows melt and flowering follows after a few days.

Plants have both basal leaves and leaves attached to the stems, but the basal ones fade quite early in the season. The basal leaves are broadly lanceolate to oblong, shaped like a spear head with the broadest part below the midway up the leaf to rather rectangular with nearly parallel sides and rounded corners, and a length of 5–13 centimeters (2–5 in) and a width of 2–4 cm (1–1.5 in). The tip can be narrowly or broadly pointed and the leaf stalks are longer than the leaf. They are strigose on the upper side and hairless underneath.

Compared with the basal leaves, those on the stems are densely strigose above, but also hairless on the undersides. They are 2–6 cm (1–2.5 in) long and just 0.5–3 cm wide with narrow to broad points and obovate-oblong to narrowly elliptic in shape.

Dissected flower showing anthers and short style

The petals are fused into a tube below and spread widely to an open trumpet longer than the tube that is usually blue, occasionally lavender, and only rarely white. The floral tube is 2–4 millimeters long, very slightly longer than the lobes of the sepals. The spreading face of the flower is radially symmetrical and 4–6 mm long. The anthers are found inside the floral tube and are attached to the tube, never extending out of it. The style is also contained within the tube and is shorter than the sepal lobes. The flowers are group together in an inflorescence that is tightly packed with flowers when blooming starts and grows into a somewhat more widely spaced branched panicle as blooming progresses.

== Taxonomy ==
The botanist Sereno Watson scientifically described Mertensia brevistyla in 1871. It is classified in the Mertensia genus within the Boraginaceae family. Mertensia brevistyla has four synonyms, one from 1908 when Marcus E. Jones described it as a variety of Mertensia alpina.

Table of Synonyms
Name	Year	Rank	Notes
Mertensia alpina var. brevistyla (S.Watson) M.E.Jones	1908	variety	≡ hom.
Mertensia congesta Greene	1901	species	= het.
Mertensia fusiformis Greene	1899	species	= het.
Mertensia papillosa var. fusiformis (Greene) A.Nelson	1909	variety	= het.
Notes: ≡ homotypic synonym; = heterotypic synonym

=== Names ===
The scientific name, brevistyla, is a Botanical Latin reference to the very short style, which does not extend out of the flower's tube. The species is known by the common names shortstyle bluebells, short-styled bluebell, and Wasatch bluebell. They are also sometimes known simply as chimingbells, but this name is applied to other species such as Mertensia lanceolata and the whole Mertensia genus.

=== Range and habitat ===
Shortstyle bluebells are native to six western US states, New Mexico, Colorado, Wyoming, Idaho, Utah, and Nevada. Though listed as native to New Mexico by Plants of the World Online, it is not recorded there by the Natural Resources Conservation Service (NRCS) plants database. In Colorado it is largely known from the western half of the state, but has also been reported in Las Animas County to the east. To the north in Wyoming, it is only recorded by the NRCS in Carbon County and likewise only in Oneida County in southeastern Idaho. The species grows in almost every northern county in Utah from Box Elder County to Duchesne County with somewhat uncertain reports of it in the southeast in San Juan County. In Nevada the NRCS reports it in the northeast in Elko County.

Unlike other species of the chimingbells genus, shortstyle bluebells usually grow in full sunlight rather than in shade. It grows in sagebrush scrub, mountain brush, quaking aspen woodlands, and spruce–fir forests from 2,000 to 3,320 meters (6,560–10,890 ft), in open woodlands and dry meadows.

=== Conservation ===
When it was evaluated by NatureServe in 1993 it was rated apparently secure at the global level (G4) and also in Colorado (S4). It is rated imperiled (S2) in Wyoming and Nevada and has not been rated in either Idaho or Utah.
