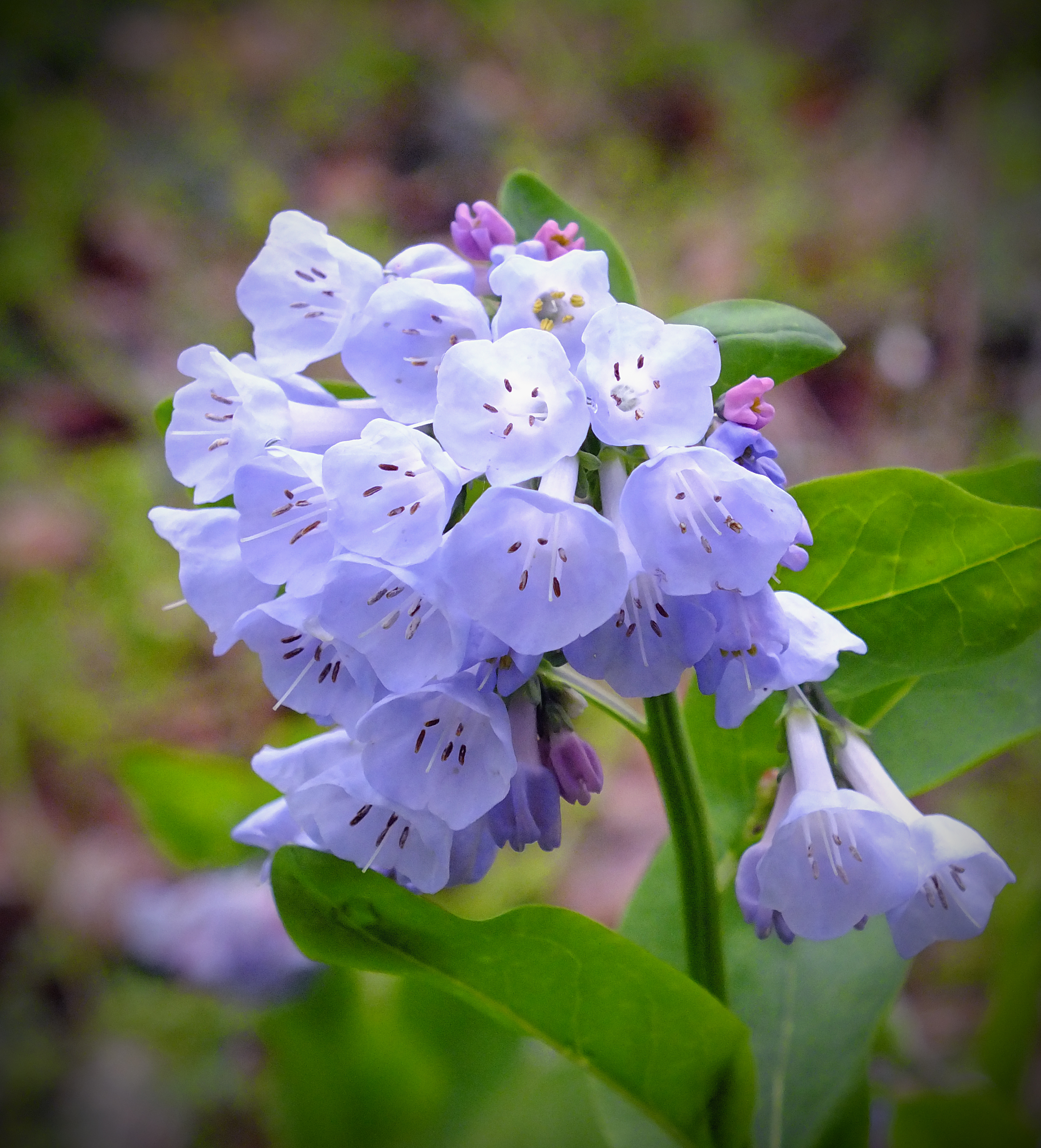
- Mertensia virginica (type species)

Scientific classification
- Kingdom: Plantae
- Clade: Tracheophytes
- Clade: Angiosperms
- Clade: Eudicots
- Clade: Asterids
- Order: Boraginales
- Family: Boraginaceae
- Subfamily: Boraginoideae
- Genus: Mertensia; Roth 1797

Type species
- Mertensia virginica (L.) Persoon ex Link

Species
- See text

= Mertensia =

Genus of flowering plants in the borage family

Mertensia is a genus of flowering plants in the borage family Boraginaceae. They are perennial herbaceous plants with blue or sometimes white flowers that open from pink-tinged buds. Such a change in flower color is common in Boraginaceae and is caused by changes in soil pH. Mertensia is one of several plants that are commonly called "bluebell". In spite of their common name, the flowers are usually salverform (trumpet-shaped) rather than campanulate (bell-shaped).The genus is also known as chimingbells.

Mertensia is native to most of North America and to a large part of Asia from western China to northeastern Russia. Its center of diversity is in the Rocky Mountains. Mertensia is mostly restricted to alpine, subalpine, and montane habitats. Notable exceptions are Mertensia maritima, a maritime plant of Arctic and subarctic coastlines, and Mertensia virginica, which is found from the Appalachian Mountains west to Minnesota, Iowa, and Missouri. Most of the species are endemic to very small areas of the Rocky Mountains.

Mertensia virginica has the largest flowers in the genus and is commonly cultivated. It is sparingly naturalized in Europe. About 12 other species are known in cultivation. The Inuit ate the rhizomes of Mertensia maritima.

Many of the species of Mertensia are hard to distinguish and some are possibly cryptic. Around 150 species names have been published in Mertensia. Most authors have recognized about 45 species, but in 2014, the authors of a molecular phylogenetic study recommended the acceptance of at least 62.

== Species ==
According to Plants of the World Online there are 52 accepted species in the genus.

- Mertensia arizonica Greene
- Mertensia bakeri Greene
- Mertensia bella Piper
- Mertensia brachycalyx Piper
- Mertensia brachyloba Greene
- Mertensia brevistyla S.Watson
- Mertensia campanulata A.Nelson
- Mertensia cana Rydb.
- Mertensia ciliata (E.James ex Torr.) G.Don
- Mertensia coronata A.Nelson
- Mertensia cusickii Piper
- Mertensia cynoglossoides Greene
- Mertensia davurica (Sims) G.Don
- Mertensia dschagastanica Regel
- Mertensia eastwoodiae J.F.Macbr.
- Mertensia fendleri A.Gray
- Mertensia franciscana A.Heller
- Mertensia grahamii (L.O.Williams) Nazaire & L.Hufford
- Mertensia humilis Rydb.
- Mertensia kamczatica (Turcz.) DC.
- Mertensia lanceolata (Pursh) DC.
- Mertensia lateriflora Greene
- Mertensia lineariloba Rydb.
- Mertensia longiflora Greene
- Mertensia longipedunculata (A.Nelson) Nazaire & L.Hufford
- Mertensia macdougalii A.Heller
- Mertensia maritima (L.) Gray
- Mertensia mexicana L.O.Williams
- Mertensia meyeriana J.F.Macbr.
- Mertensia nevadensis A.Nelson
- Mertensia nivalis Rydb.
- Mertensia oblongifolia (Nutt.) G.Don
- Mertensia oreophila L.O.Williams
- Mertensia ovata Rydb.
- Mertensia pallasii (Ledeb.) G.Don
- Mertensia paniculata (Aiton) G.Don
- Mertensia parvifolia (L.O.Williams) Nazaire & L.Hufford
- Mertensia platyphylla A.Heller
- Mertensia pratensis A.Heller
- Mertensia pterocarpa (Turcz.) Tatew. & Ohwi
- Mertensia rivularis DC.
- Mertensia serrulata (Turcz.) DC.
- Mertensia sibirica (L.) G.Don
- Mertensia simplicissima (Ledeb.) G.Don
- Mertensia sinica Kamelin
- Mertensia stylosa (Fisch.) DC.
- Mertensia subcordata Greene
- Mertensia tarbagataica B.Fedtsch.
- Mertensia tweedyi Rydb.
- Mertensia umbratilis Greenm.
- Mertensia virginica (L.) Pers. ex Link
- Mertensia viridis (A.Nelson) A.Nelson

== Classification ==
Mertensia is a member of the tribe Cynoglosseae. Its closest relative is the monotypic Eurasian genus Asperugo. These two are probably close to Anoplocaryum, a genus of Central Asia and Siberia. The relationships of Anoplocaryum have never been investigated by cladistic analysis of DNA sequences.

== Taxonomy ==
The type species for Mertensia is M. virginica. Mertensia is divided into two sections: Stenhammaria and Mertensia. Section Stenhammaria consists of the circumboreal M. maritima and 11 of the 12 species from Asia.

The Central Asian species, M. dschagastanica, is assigned to section Stenhammaria, but it is morphologically unusual and might constitute a third section of Mertensia. It has never been sampled for DNA.

Section Mertensia consists of all of the North American species plus M. rivularis, a denizen of the Russian half of the Beringian floristic region.

The North American species M. pilosa has been reported from Sakhalin and the Kuril Islands. It is the only species of Mertensia that is native to both Asia and North America. It resembles M. rivularis and might be closer to that species than to the other species of North America. It also resembles M. platyphylla and some authors have placed it in synonymy under Mertensia platyphylla variety platyphylla. It has not yet been sampled in a molecular phylogenetic study.

With the possible exception of M. pilosa, North American Mertensia is a monophyletic group consisting of three clades that are known informally as the Pacific Northwest clade, the Southern Rocky Mountain clade, and the Central Rocky Mountain clade. These groups are named for the region where most of their species occur, but each includes species from well outside of that region.

== History ==
In 1753, in his landmark Species Plantarum, Swedish botanist Carl Linnaeus placed five species in the genus Pulmonaria. Albrecht Wilhelm Roth, in 1797, separated what are now M. virginica, M. maritima, and M. sibirica from Pulmonaria to form the genus Mertensia, based on their smaller and differently structured calyx, their different anther position, and the presence of nectar glands on the inner surface of the corolla. Roth described one species as Mertensia pulmonarioides, apparently unaware that Linnaeus had already described it as Pulmonaria virginica. He thus created a superfluous synonym that has been a source of confusion ever since.

Mertensia was named after the German botanist, Franz Carl Mertens.

In the time since Mertensia was erected in 1797, it has been the subject of six major revisions. These, in chronological order, were done by George Don (George Don, the younger (G. Don), not George Don, the elder (Don)), Asa Gray, James Francis Macbride, Per Axel Rydberg, Louis Otho Williams, and Mikhail Grigorevich Popov.

Asa Gray divided Mertensia into two sections: Stenhammaria and Mertensia. The section Stenhammaria was named for the Swedish naturalist and clergyman Christian Stenhammar, who is best known for his work in lichenology. Gray defined the section Stenhammaria as consisting only of the littoral species M. maritima, but in 2014, it was expanded to comprise 12 species.

In 1886, Asa Gray described seven species in Mertensia. After Gray completed his monograph of Mertensia, many species were discovered by botanical expeditions in the western United States. Many of the species recognized by Macbride and Rydberg were later placed in synonymy by Louis O. Williams in his treatment of North American Mertensia in which he accepted only 24 species, far fewer than Macbride and Rydberg. M. pilosa was not mentioned anywhere in the monograph by Williams, not even as a synonym. Popov (1953) recognized the same 24 North American species as Williams as well as 14 species from Asia, including M. pilosa. Phylogenetic analysis of DNA data has shown that many of the species are polyphyletic, but no comprehensive revision of the Asian or of the North American species has been attempted since 1953.

In 1967, one of the sections delineated by Popov was raised to the rank of genus as Pseudomertensia. This reclassification has been confirmed by molecular phylogenies which place Pseudomertensia closer to Myosotis than any of the genera that have been sampled so far.

== Evolution ==
In the earlier infrageneric classifications of Mertensia, some of the groups were based on shared "primitive" characters rather than the derived character states that show true phylogenetic relationships. In Mertensia, as elsewhere, such groups have often proved to be paraphyletic. More recently, molecular phylogenetics has greatly clarified the ancestral and derived character states in Mertensia. Some of the traits evolving later have appeared independently as many as seven times.

Ancestral states in Mertensia include short plant height (< 40 cm), long stamens (> 1.5 mm), filaments inserted higher in the corolla, calyces divided at least ^{2}/_{3} of the way to the base, and acute to acuminate calyx lobe apices. Their derived alternatives are greater plant height (> 40 cm), short stamens (< 1.5 mm), filaments attached lower in the corolla, and calyces divided less than halfway to the base, and obtuse calyx lobe apices.

The nutlets and pollen of Mertensia are nearly uniform and consequently, are not of much taxonomic value.

There are no known fossils of Mertensia. A molecular clock analysis has estimated that Mertensia diverged from Asperugo in the late Oligocene or early Miocene. Asperugo and Mertensia do not closely resemble each other morphologically. Being mostly plants of subarctic climates, Mertensia spread southward and to lower elevation during periods of Pleistocene glaciation, then retreated northward and to higher elevation during interglacials. Mertensia originated in Asia and dispersed over the Beringian land bridge to North America. Most of the groups that originated in Asia are more diverse there, but Mertensia is a conspicuous exception in having most of its species in North America.

== Gallery ==
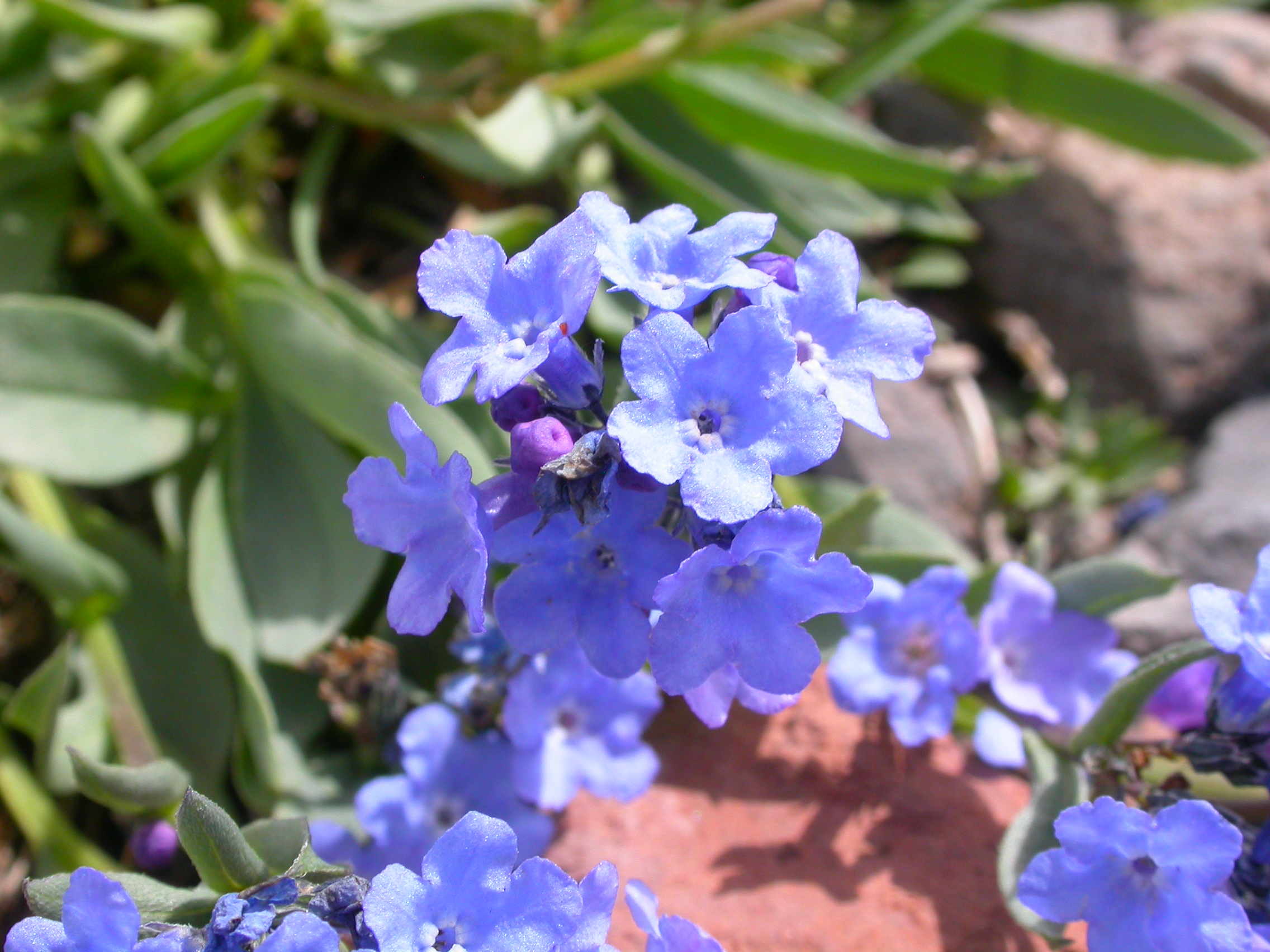
Alpine bluebells (Mertensia alpina)

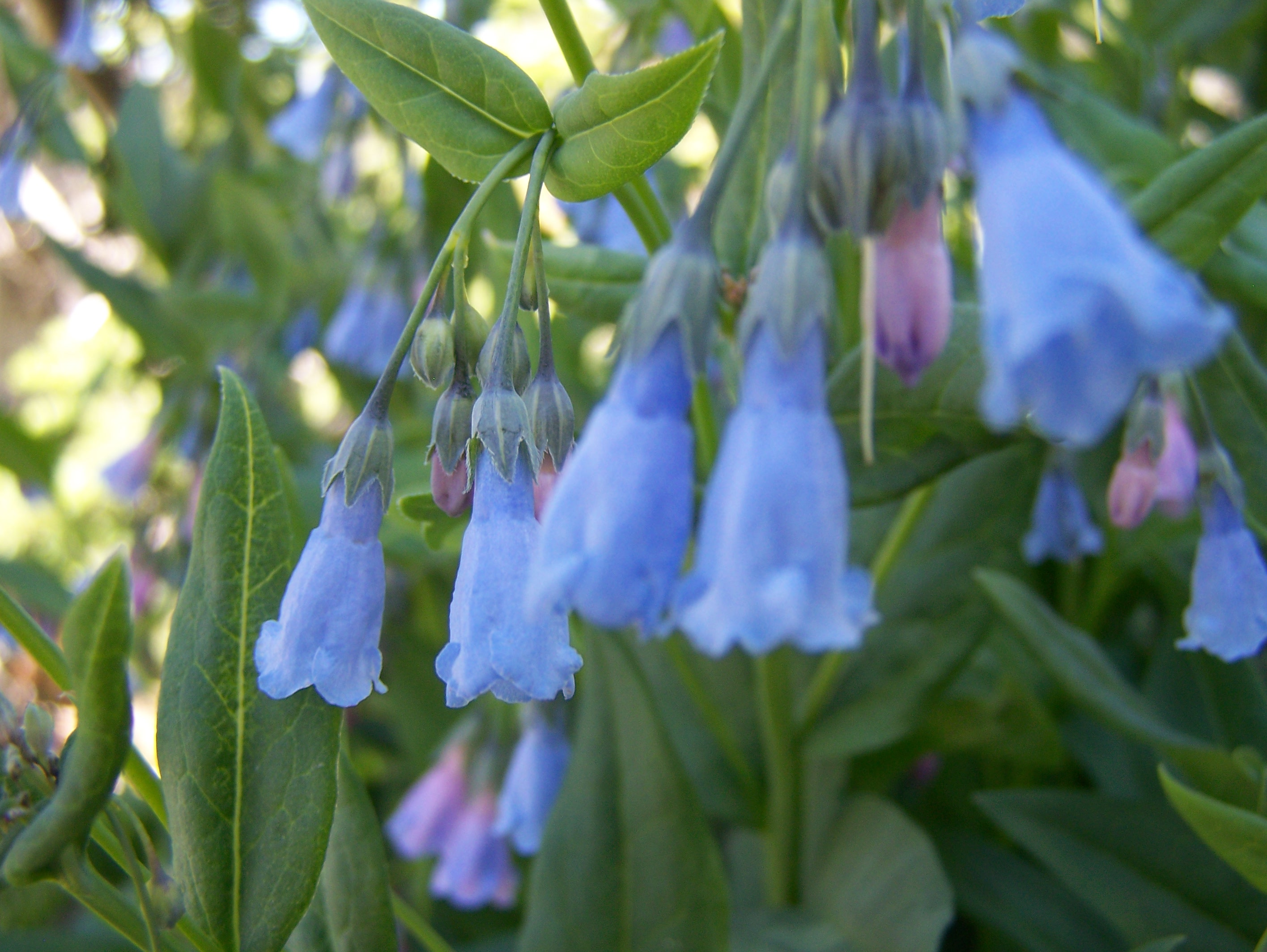
Aspen Bluebells (Mertensia arizonica)

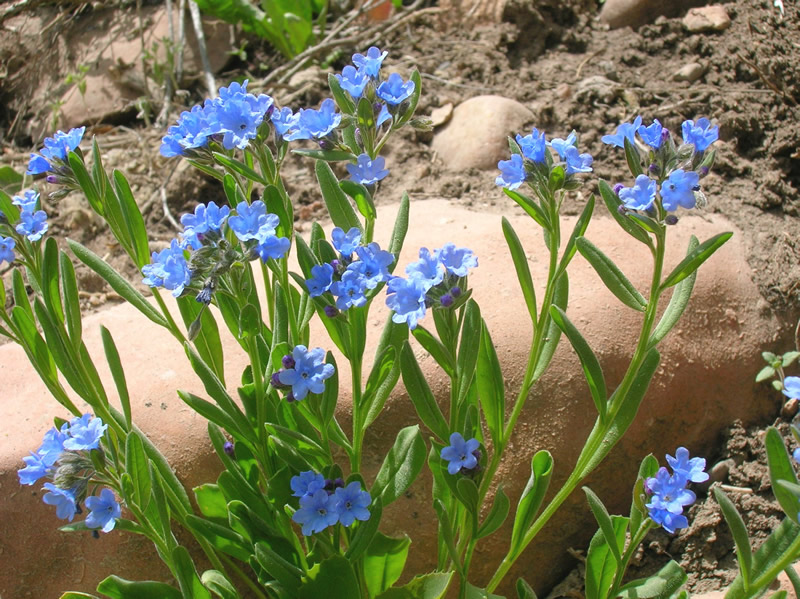
Short-styled Bluebell (Mertensia brevistyla)

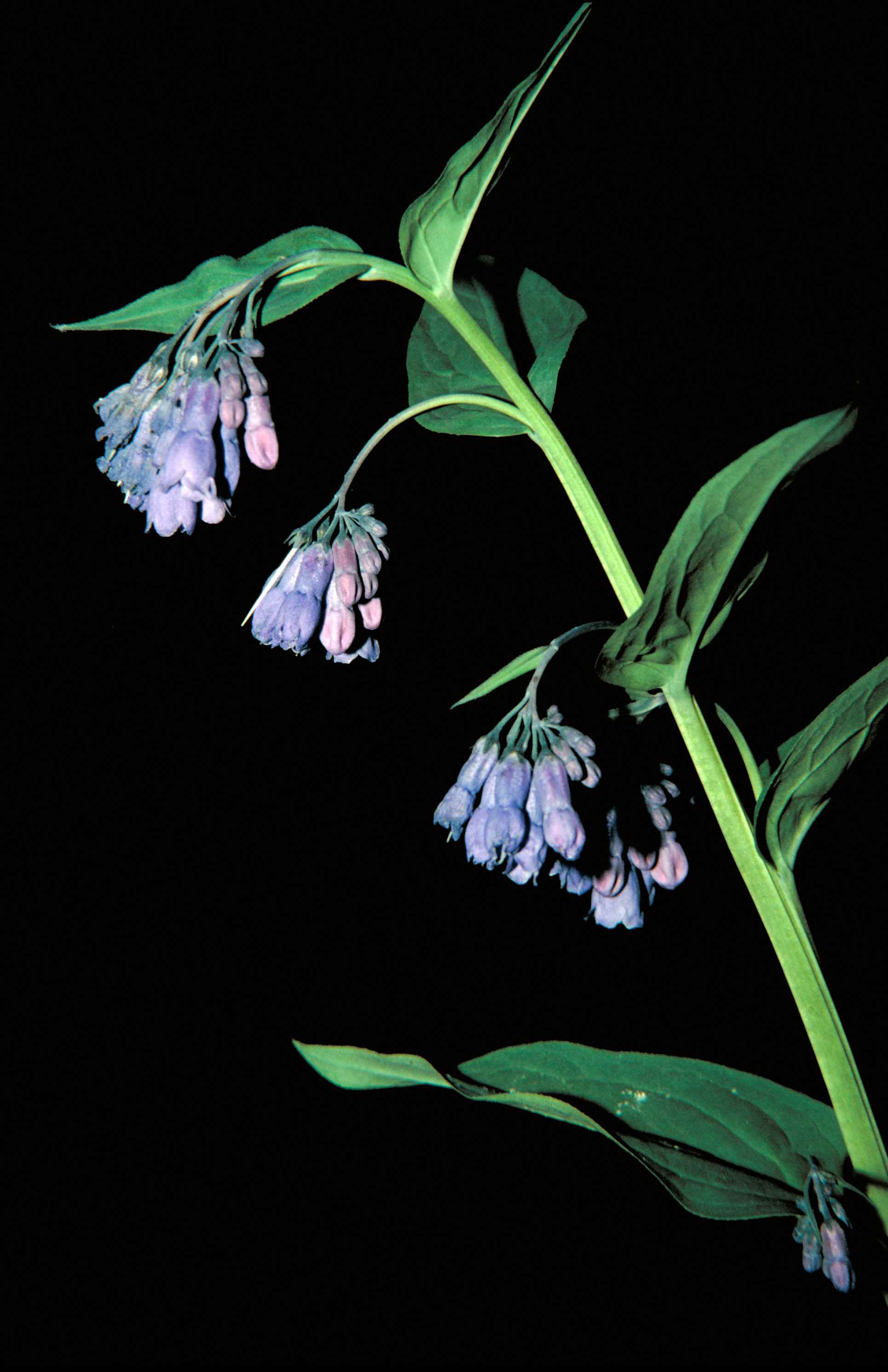
Mountain bell (Mertensia ciliata)

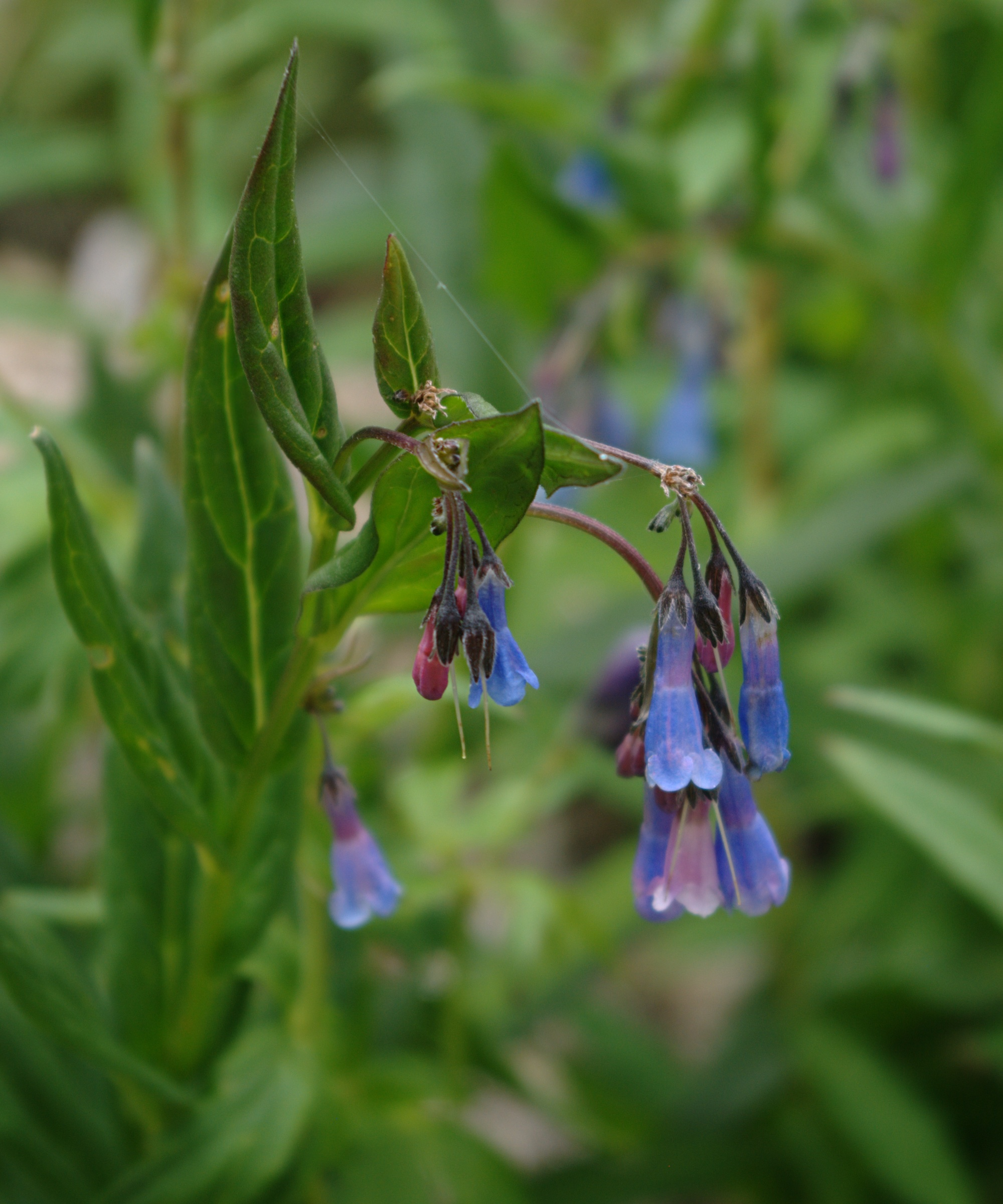
Franciscan bluebells (Mertensia franciscana)

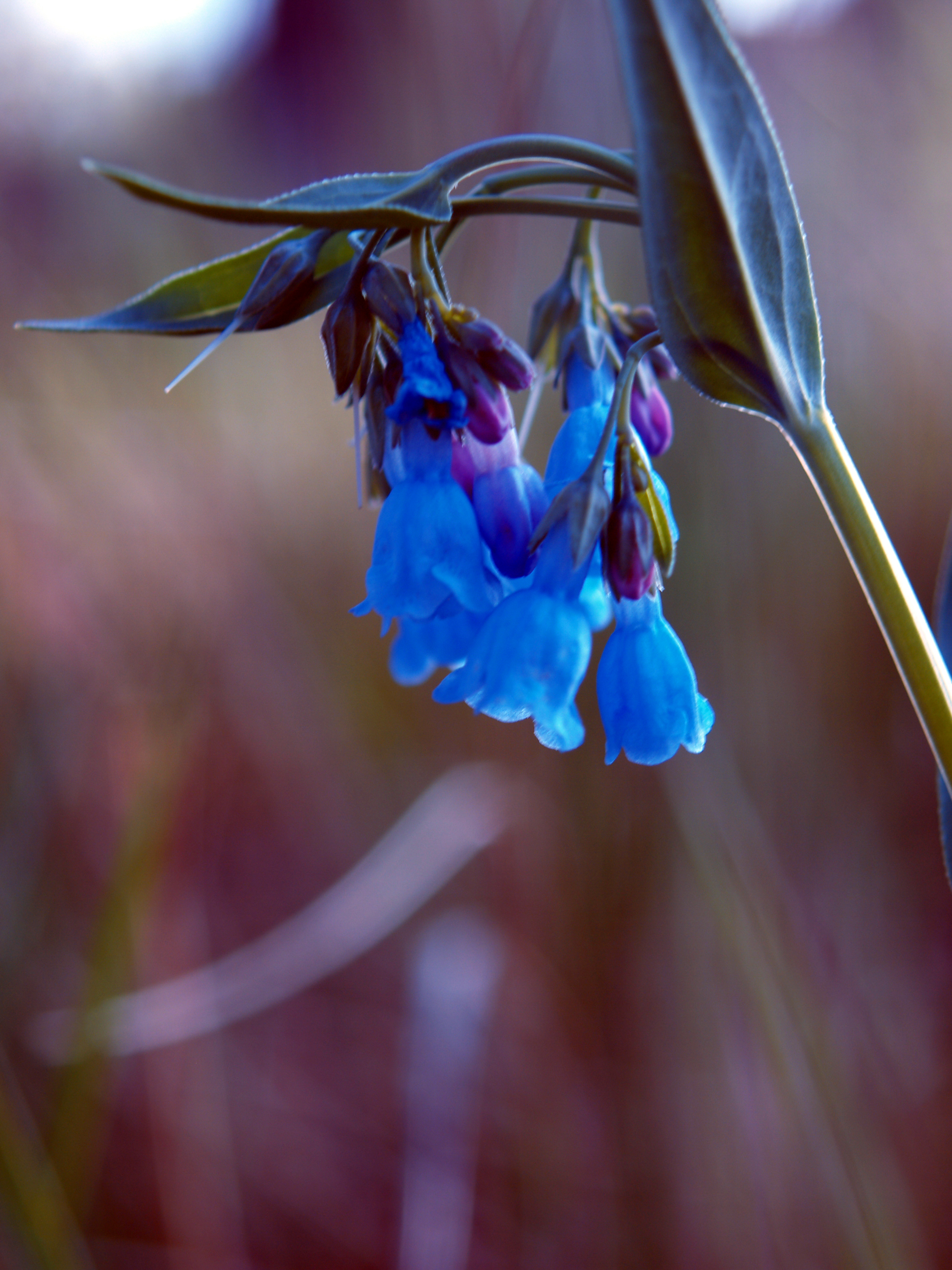
Prairie bluebells (Mertensia lanceolata)

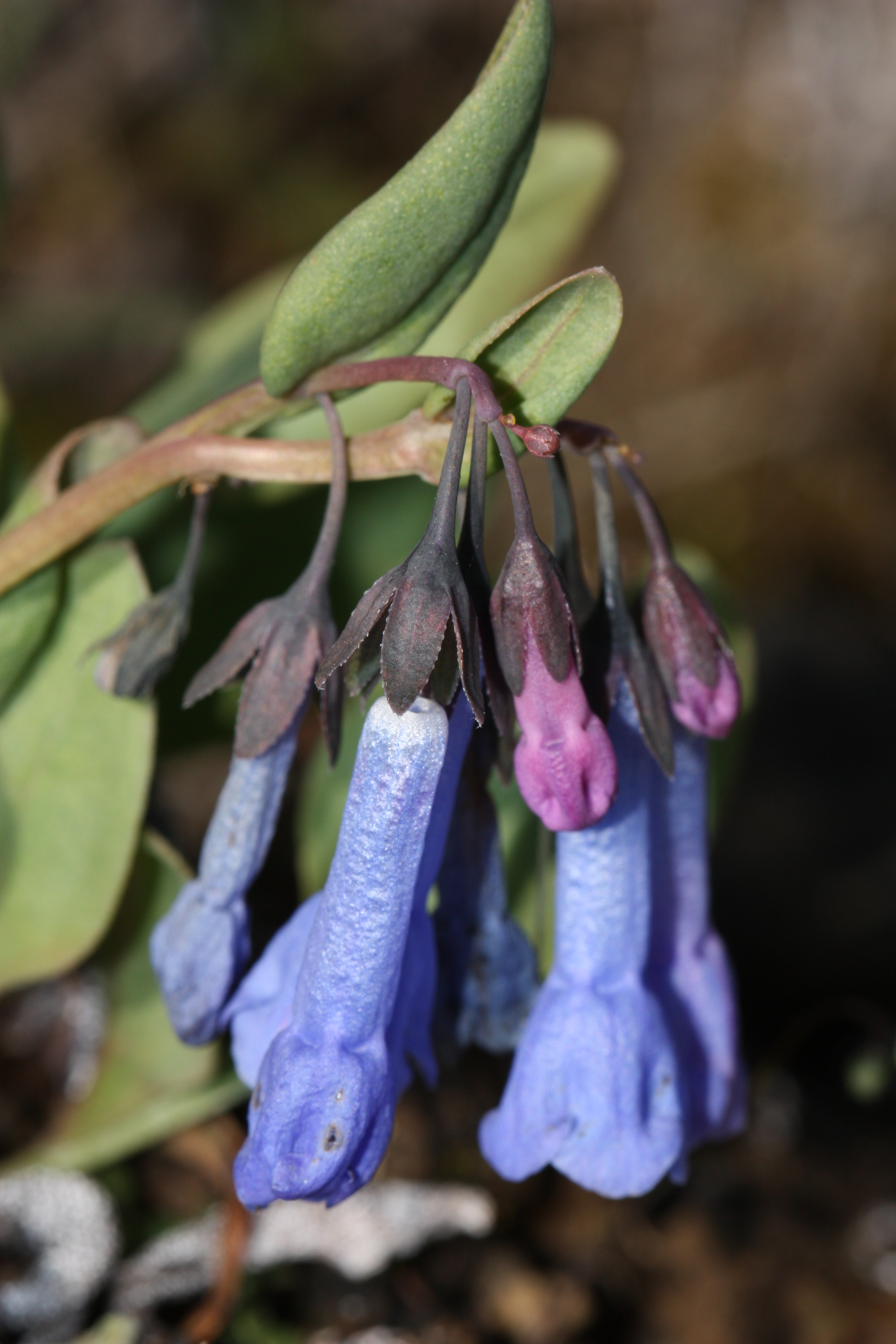
Long bluebells (Mertensia longiflora)

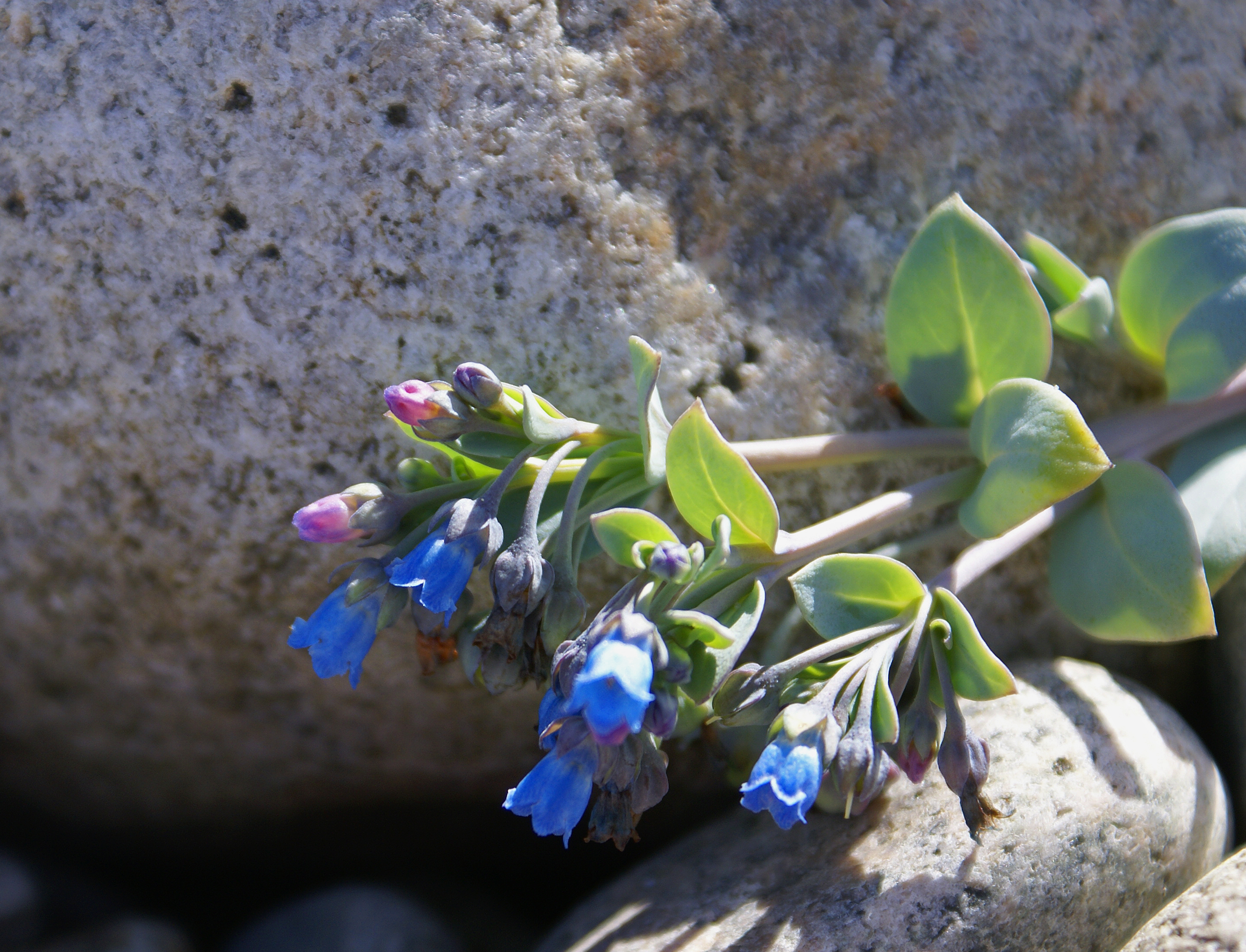
Oysterplant (Mertensia maritima)

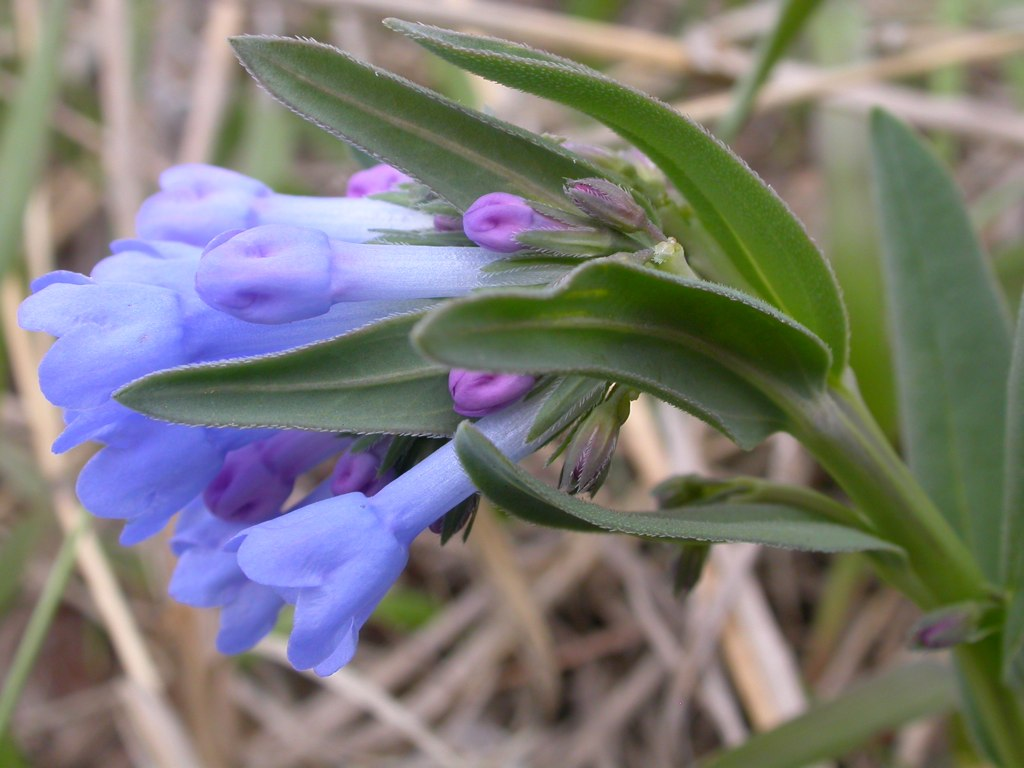
Oblongleaf bluebells (Mertensia oblongifolia)

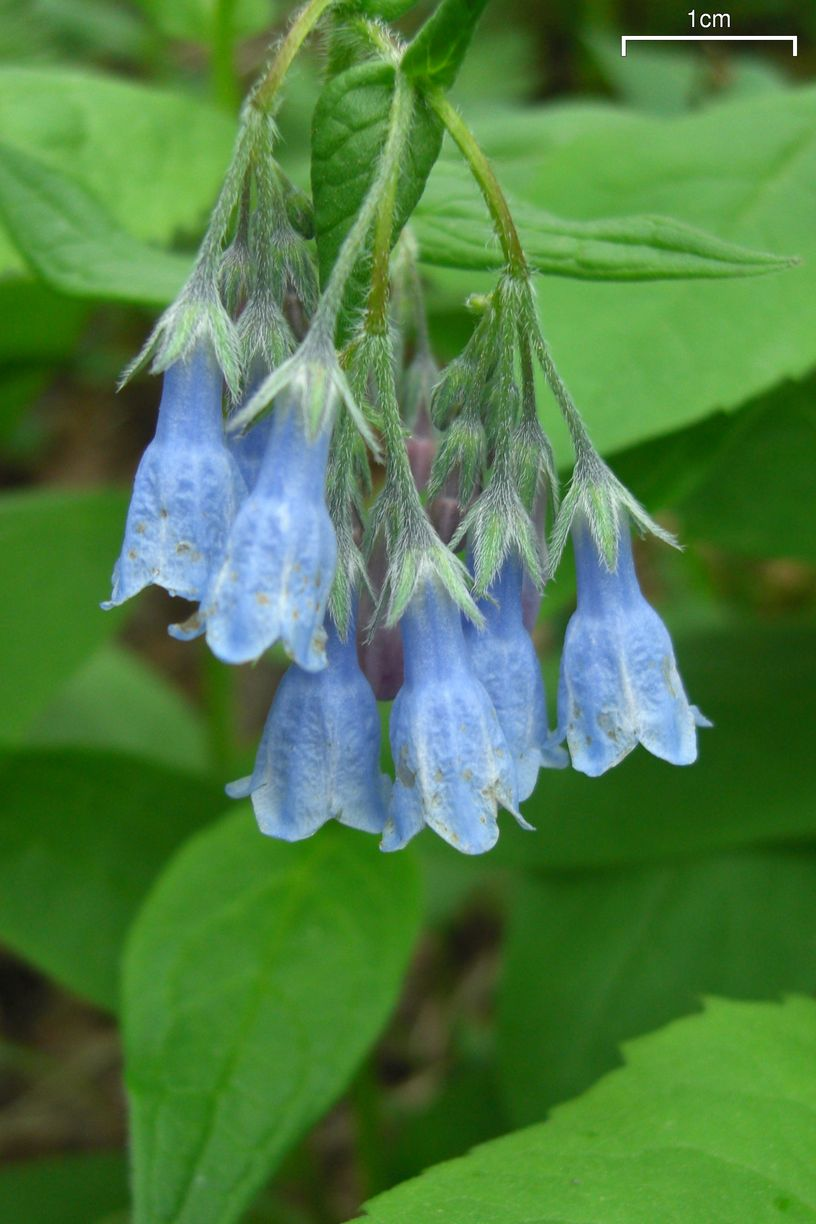
Tall bluebells (Mertensia paniculata)

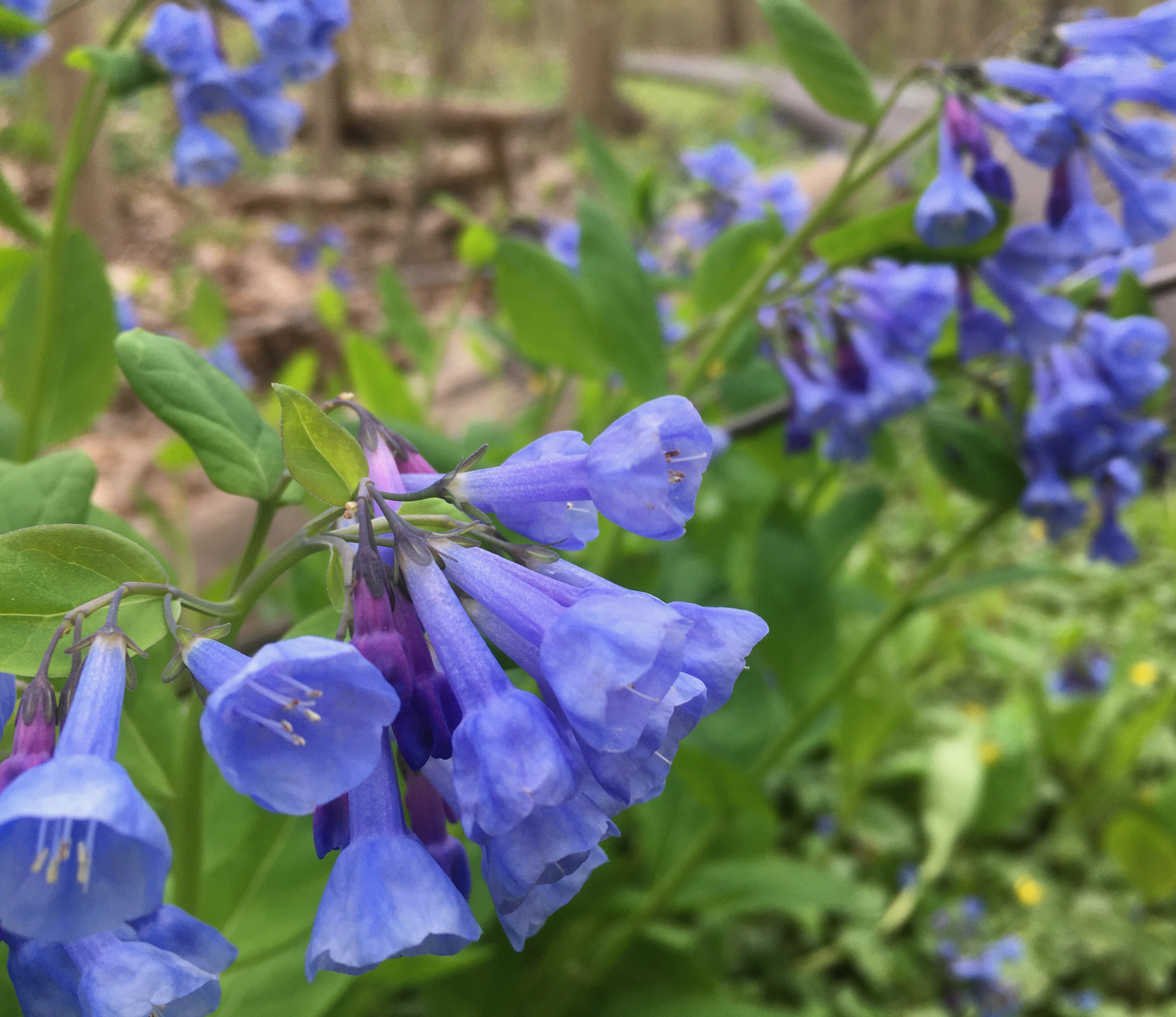
Virginia bluebells (Mertensia virginica )
