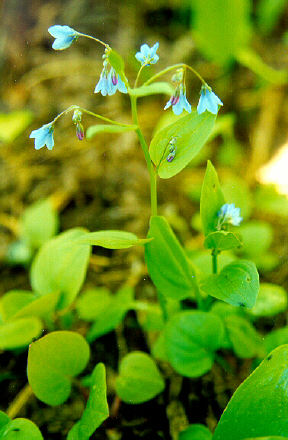

Scientific classification
- Kingdom: Plantae
- Clade: Tracheophytes
- Clade: Angiosperms
- Clade: Eudicots
- Clade: Asterids
- Order: Boraginales
- Family: Boraginaceae
- Genus: Mertensia
- Species: M. bella

Binomial name
- Mertensia bella Piper

= Mertensia bella =

Species of flowering plant

Mertensia bella is a species of flowering plant in the borage family known by the common names beautiful bluebells and Oregon lungwort. It is native to the northwestern United States, where it grows in wet mountain habitat. It is a perennial herb producing a slender, erect stem and caudex unit up to half a meter tall. The rough-haired leaves are alternately arranged and borne on petioles. The inflorescence is an open array of clustered bright blue, bell-shaped flowers up to a centimeter wide at the lobed mouths.
