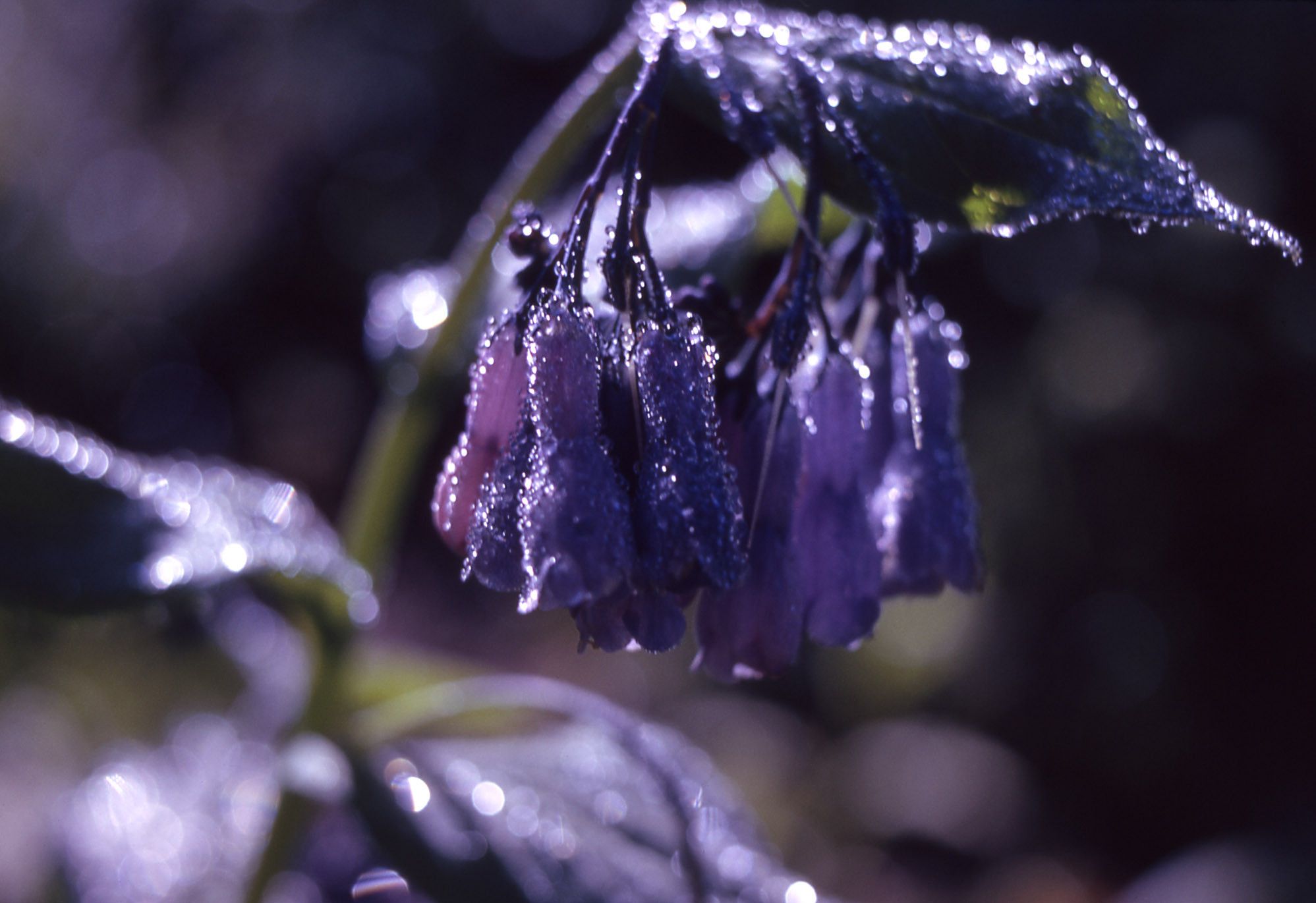

Conservation status
- Secure (NatureServe)

Scientific classification
- Kingdom: Plantae
- Clade: Embryophytes
- Clade: Tracheophytes
- Clade: Spermatophytes
- Clade: Angiosperms
- Clade: Eudicots
- Clade: Asterids
- Order: Boraginales
- Family: Boraginaceae
- Genus: Mertensia
- Species: M. ciliata

Binomial name
- Mertensia ciliata (E.James ex Torr.) G.Don

Subspecies
- M. c. var. ciliata; M. c. var. stomatechoides

Synonyms
- Pulmonaria ciliata

= Mertensia ciliata =

Plant species in the borage family

Mertensia ciliata is a species of flowering plant in the borage family known by the common names mountain bluebell, tall fringed bluebells, and streamside bluebells.

== Description ==
Mertensia ciliata is a perennial herb producing a cluster of erect stems from a thick, branching caudex. The leafy stems reach well over a meter in maximum height. The leaves are up to 15 centimetres (6 in) long, veiny, and oval to lance-shaped.

Blooming from May to August, the inflorescence is an open array of many clustered blue bell-shaped flowers each between 1 and 2 cm (1/2 and 3/4 in) long. The hanging, fragrant flower is tubular, expanding into a wider, lobed mouth. As the individual flowers progress in age they change in color from blue to pink-red.

== Taxonomy ==
In 1827 the botanist John Torrey described a new species in the genus Pulmonaria which he named Pulmonaria ciliata and credited to Edwin James. It was moved to the genus Mertensia in 1837 by George Don, giving the species its accepted name of Mertensia ciliata. Together with its genus it is classified in the Boraginaceae family and has two accepted varieties according to Plants of the World Online.

- Mertensia ciliata var. ciliata – Widespread from Oregon to New Mexico
- Mertensia ciliata var. stomatechoides – Native to Oregon, California, & Nevada

Mertensia ciliata has 15 synonyms of the species or one of its two varieties.

Table of Synonyms
Name	Year	Rank	Synonym of:	Notes
Mertensia ciliata f. candida J.F.Macbr. & Payson	1917	form	var. ciliata	= het.
Mertensia ciliata var. latiloba L.O.Williams	1937	variety	var. ciliata	= het.
Mertensia ciliata var. polyphylla A.Nelson	1909	variety	var. ciliata	= het.
Mertensia ciliata var. punctata A.Nelson	1909	variety	var. ciliata	= het.
Mertensia ciliata var. subpubescens (Rydb.) J.F.Macbr. & Payson	1917	variety	var. ciliata	= het.
Mertensia incongruens J.F.Macbr. & Payson	1917	species	var. ciliata	= het.
Mertensia pallida Rydb.	1909	species	var. ciliata	= het.
Mertensia picta Rydb.	1904	species	var. ciliata	= het.
Mertensia platensis (Rydb.) Rydb.	1906	species	var. ciliata	= het.
Mertensia polyphylla Greene	1899	species	var. ciliata	= het.
Mertensia polyphylla var. platensis Rydb.	1905	variety	var. ciliata	= het.
Mertensia punctata Greene	1899	species	var. ciliata	= het.
Mertensia stomatechoides Kellogg	1861	species	var. stomatechoides	≡ hom.
Mertensia subpubescens Rydb.	1903	species	var. ciliata	= het.
Pulmonaria ciliata E.James ex Torr.	1827	species	M. ciliata	≡ hom.
Notes: ≡ homotypic synonym ; = heterotypic synonym

== Distribution and habitat ==
It is native to the western United States. It grows throughout the southwestern US in the states of California, Nevada, Utah, and Arizona. It is also found in the northwest in Oregon and Idaho. It also is known from the Rocky Mountain states of Montana, Wyoming, Colorado, and New Mexico. It is found as far east as South Dakota.

It often grows in moist habitat, such as subalpine meadows and creeksides. It often carpets large areas of meadow and hillside with blue-green foliage and sweet-scented bluebell blooms.

== Ecology ==
The flowers bear poricidal anthers and are fertilized via buzz-pollination by several Bombus species. Primary nectar robbing by Bombus species, including B. occidentalis, is common in some populations.

== Uses ==
The flowers, young stems and leaves are edible raw; older leaves (when the plant tends to be hairy) should be cooked. The plant contains alkaloids so should not be eaten in high quantities.
