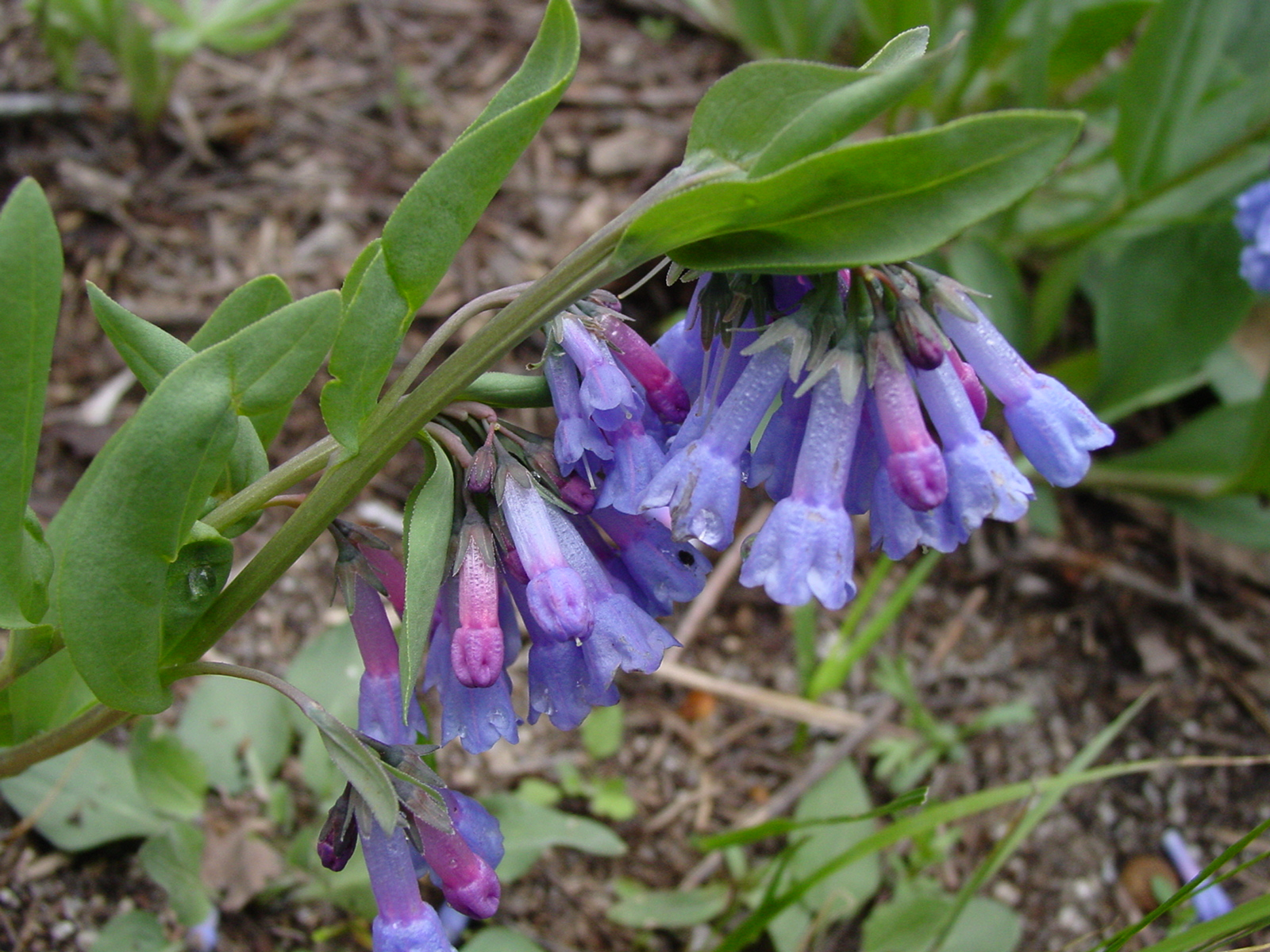

Conservation status
- Secure (NatureServe)

Scientific classification
- Kingdom: Plantae
- Clade: Tracheophytes
- Clade: Angiosperms
- Clade: Eudicots
- Clade: Asterids
- Order: Boraginales
- Family: Boraginaceae
- Genus: Mertensia
- Species: M. oblongifolia

Binomial name
- Mertensia oblongifolia (Nutt.) G.Don, 1838

= Mertensia oblongifolia =

Species of flowering plant

Mertensia oblongifolia is a species of flowering plant in the borage family known by the common names oblongleaf bluebells and sagebrush bluebells.

It is native to the western United States, where it grows in several types of habitat, including meadows and sagebrush.

== Description ==
Mertensia oblongifolia is a perennial herb producing many erect stems from a thick, branching caudex, approaching 40 centimeters in maximum height. The leaves are oval to lance-shaped, located all along the stem. The inflorescence is a dense, sometimes crowded cluster of hanging blue tubular flowers with expanded, bell-like mouths. The flower measures 1 to 2 centimeters long.
