= Ira Waddell Clokey =

American mining engineer and botanist

- Born: December 21, 1878; Decatur, Illinois
- Died: January 13, 1950 (aged 71); Pasadena, California
- Education: University of Illinois, Harvard University, Iowa State University

Ira Waddell Clokey (1878-1950) was an American mining engineer and botanist active in the western United States. He first studied at the University of Illinois, then moved to Harvard University, graduating with a Bachelor of Science in mining engineering in 1903. From 1904 to 1915, Clokey worked as a mining engineer in Mexico. In his spare time he collected plant specimens for his personal herbarium, which, however, was almost completely destroyed during a fire in 1912. In 1921, Clokey completed a Master of Science in plant pathology from Iowa State University.

Clokey began intensive studies of the flora of the Charleston Mountains in southern Nevada in 1935. At the same time he started to edit and distribute the exsiccata-like specimen series Charleston Mountain Flora, Clark County, Nevada. His book, Flora of the Charleston Mountains, Clark County, Nevada was accepted for publication just prior to his death in 1950.

The International Plant Names Index lists 44 plant names published by Ira Waddell Clokey.

== List of plants named after him ==
A number of plants have been named in his honor:

- Allium howellii var. clokeyi Ownbey & Aase, 1972
- Astragalus oophorus var. clokeyanus Barneby, 1954
- Castilleja clokeyi Pennell, 1938 (=Castilleja applegatei subsp. martinii (Abrams) T.I.Chuang & Heckard, 1992
- Cirsium clokeyi S.F.Blake, 1938 (=Cirsium eatonii var. clokeyi (S.F.Blake) D.J.Keil, 2004)
- Cryptantha clokeyi I.M.Johnst., 1939 (=Cryptantha muricata var. clokeyi (I.M.Johnst.) Jeps., 1943)
- Ephedra clokeyi H.C.Cutler, 1939 (=Ephedra fasciculata var. clokeyi A.Nelson 1945)
- Erigeron clokeyi Cronquist, 1947
- Eriogonum heermannii var. clokeyi Reveal, 1976
- Forsellesia clokeyi Ensign, 1942 (=Glossopetalon clokeyi (Ensign) H.St.John, 1942)
- Gilia clokeyi H.Mason, 1942
- Lupinus breweri var. clokeyanus C.P.Sm., 1940
- Lupinus clokeyanus C.P.Sm., 1944 (=Lupinus argenteus var. palmeri (S.Watson) Barneby, 1986
- Mertensia clokeyi Osterh., 1919 (=Mertensia lanceolata var. secundorum (Cockerell) Cockerell 1918)
- Salvia dorrii var. clokeyi Strachan, 1982
- Silene clokeyi C.L.Hitchc. & Maguire, 1947
- Solanum clokeyi Munz, 1932

The standard author abbreviation Clokey is used to indicate this person as the author when citing a botanical name.
