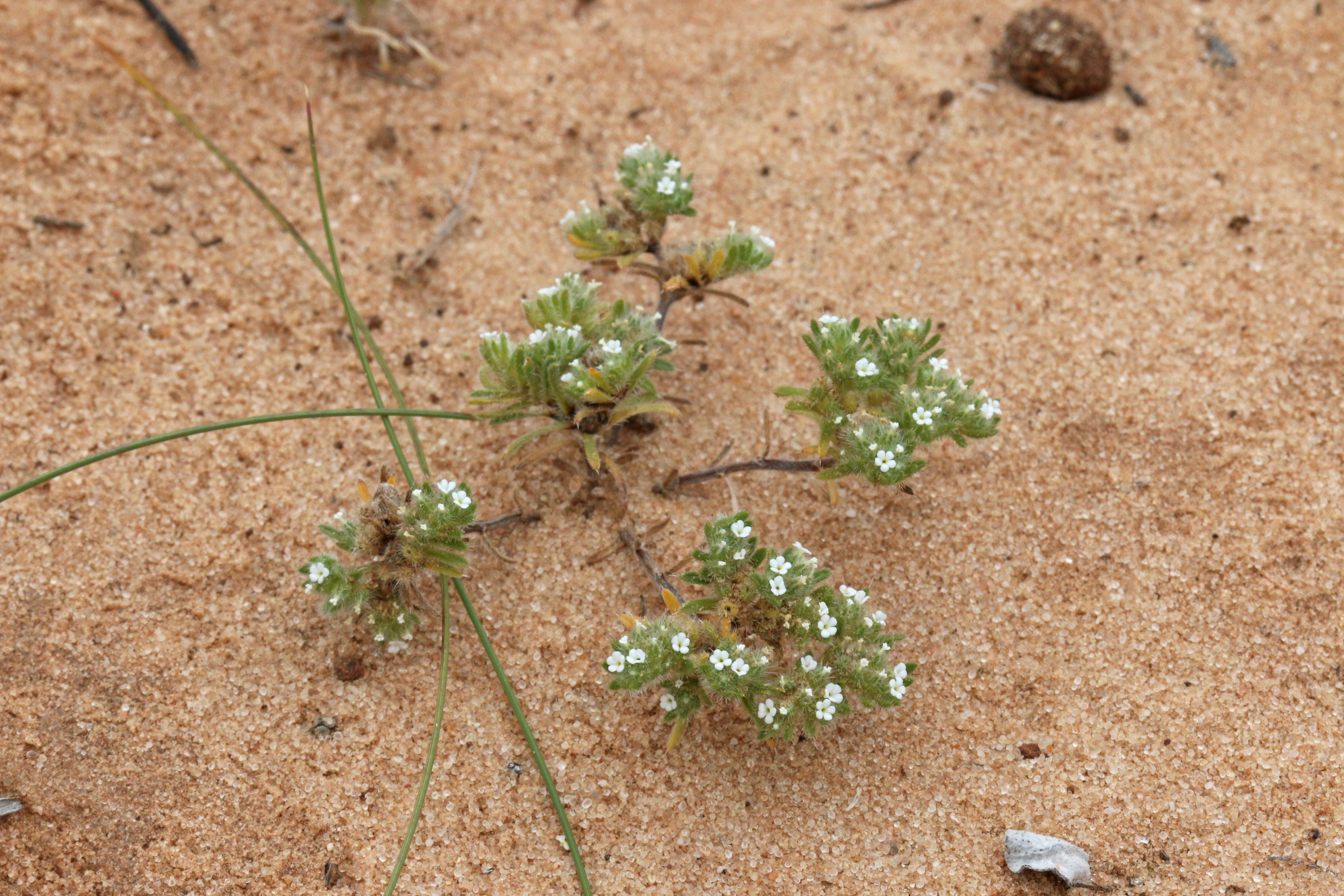
- Cushion catseye (syn. Cryptantha circumscissa var. circumscissa) Greeneocharis circumscissa

Scientific classification
- Kingdom: Plantae
- Clade: Embryophytes
- Clade: Tracheophytes
- Clade: Spermatophytes
- Clade: Angiosperms
- Clade: Eudicots
- Clade: Asterids
- Order: Boraginales
- Family: Boraginaceae
- Genus: Greeneocharis; Gürke & Harms

Species
- See text.

Synonyms
- Piptocalyx Torr.; Wheelerella G.B.Grant

= Greeneocharis =

Genus of flowering plants in the borage family

Greeneocharis is a genus of flowering plants in the family Boraginaceae. There are two species, and it has a disjunct distribution in the western United States and northwestern Mexico in North America and western Argentina in southern South America. It is part of subtribe of Amsinckiinae.

It was once thought to be a either a subgenus or synonym of Cryptantha Lehm. ex G. Don, before being segregated out due to molecular phylogenetic analysis.

== Description ==
It is an annual herb, with cushion-like, roots, which can have red-purple tinge. It has branches ascending to erect on a slender stem, generally strigose (having straight hairs all pointing in more or less the same direction). The leaves are sessile, arranged alternate and congested at the branch tips. They are linear, oblanceolate, or narrowly oblong (in shape) and hairy. The inflorescence is spike-like cymes. They have flower bracts. The flower consists of calyx lobes which are fused at base, and the tube is circumscissile in fruit (meaning it splits or opens along a circumference). The white, corolla limb is 1–6 mm (0–0 in) in diameter with appendages present. After it has flowered it produces a fruit (or seed capsule), which has a pedicel 5–27 cm (2–11 in) 0-0.5 mm in fruit. The fruit axis is similar to the nutlet length. It can have between 2–4 nutlets, which are generally similar (or dissimilar), smooth to roughened and without ridges. The margin is rounded and has an attachment scar abutted near apex, forked and gapped at the base. The style is extended to or just below nutlet tips.

== Taxonomy ==
The Latin specific epithet Greeneocharis is derived from California botanist Edward Lee Greene (1843–1915) and charis which means "beauty, delight".

It was first published Nat. Pflanzenfam., Register on page 460 in 1899.

Then in 1924, Ivan M. Johnston wrote that the genus of Oreocarya could be combined with Cryptantha. Edwin Blake Payson in 1927 (A Monograph of the section Oreocarya of Cryptantha, Ann. Mo. Bot. Gard. 14:211-358) agreed with Johnston and he had four sections in Cryptantha: Eucryptantha (= Cryptantha), Geocarya, Krynitzkia (inclusive of Eremocarya, Greeneocharis, and Johnstonella), and Oreocarya. Larry Higgins (1971), another expert on the perennial taxa, published a revised monograph of Oreocarya, and agreed with Johnston and Payson on the inclusion of Oreocarya within Cryptantha, but also elevating the four sections of Johnston (1927) and Payson (1927) to subgenera. Although they were sometimes still called synonyms of Cryptantha.

In 2012, the phylogenetic relationship of members of the genus Cryptantha was carried out, based on dna sequencing analyses, it was then proposed that the resurrection of the following genera; Eremocarya, Greeneocharis, Johnstonella, and also Oreocarya.

== Species ==
Two accepted species:

- Greeneocharis circumscissa (Hook. & Arn.) Rydb.
  - Greeneocharis circumscissa var. circumscissa
  - Greeneocharis circumscissa var. hispida J.F.Macbr.
  - Greeneocharis circumscissa var. rosulata (J.T.Howell) Hasenstab & M.G.Simpson
- Greeneocharis similis (K.Mathew & P.H.Raven) Hasenstab & M.G.Simpson

== Distribution ==
The genus is found in the United States (within the states of Arizona, California, Colorado, Nevada, Oregon, Utah, Washington and Wyoming) and also in north western Mexico and southern and northwestern Argentina.

== Other sources ==
- Cronquist, A. et al. 1972-. Intermountain flora.
- Johnston, I. M. 1927. Studies in the Boraginaceae VI. A revision of the South American Boraginoideae. Contr. Gray Herb. 78:31.
