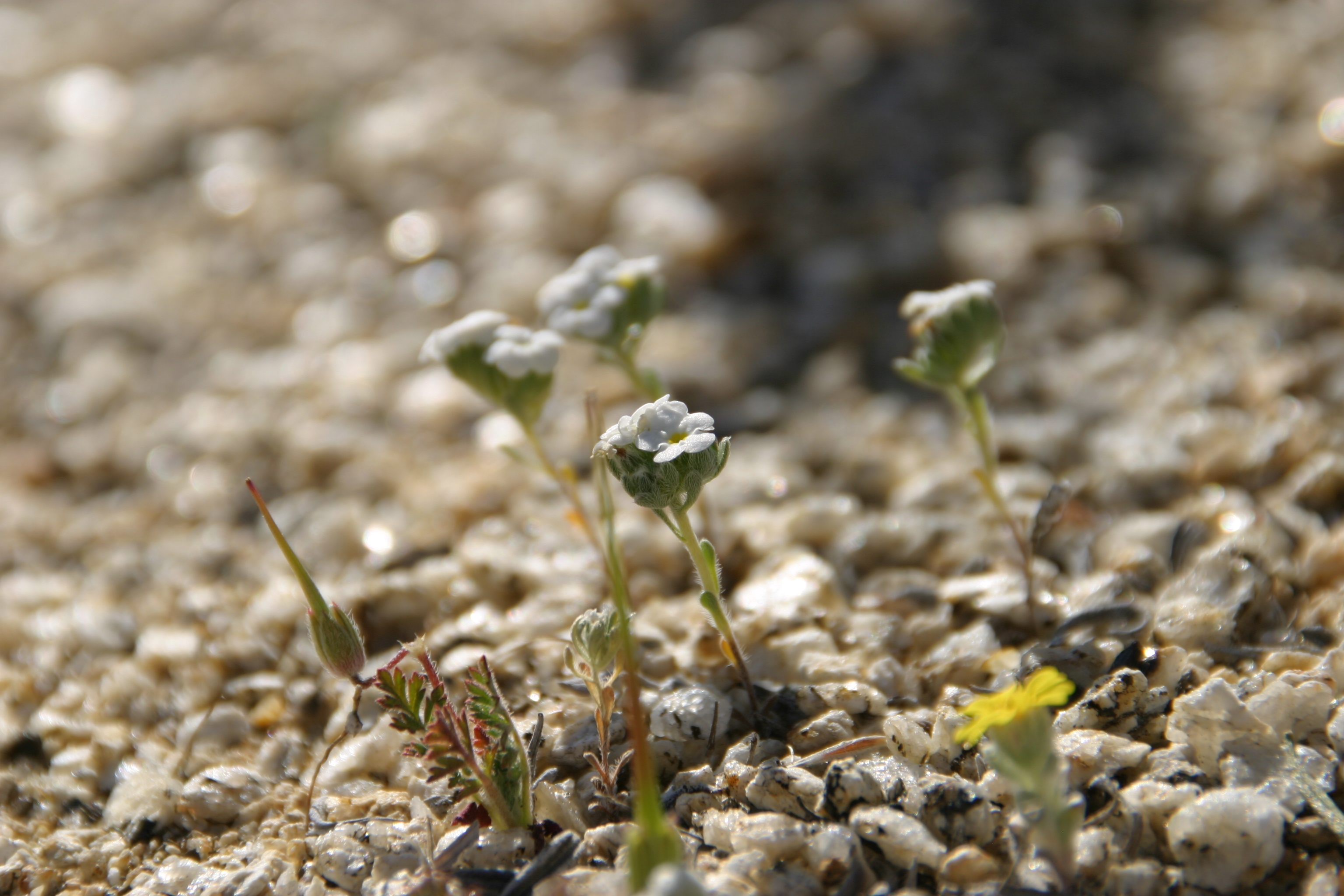
- Cryptantha micrantha, synonym of Eremocarya micrantha

Scientific classification
- Kingdom: Plantae
- Clade: Embryophytes
- Clade: Tracheophytes
- Clade: Spermatophytes
- Clade: Angiosperms
- Clade: Eudicots
- Clade: Asterids
- Order: Boraginales
- Family: Boraginaceae
- Genus: Eremocarya; Greene

Species
- Eremocarya lepida (A.Gray) Greene; Eremocarya micrantha (Torr.) Greene

= Eremocarya =

Genus of flowering plants in the borage family

Eremocarya is a genus of flowering plants in the family Boraginaceae. There are two species and its native range extends through the western United States and Texas to northwestern Mexico. It is part of subtribe of Amsinckiinae.

It was once thought to be an either a subgenus or synonym of Cryptantha Lehm. ex G. Don, before being segregated out due to molecular phylogenetic analysis.

== Description ==
A profusely branching annual herb with very slender, ascending, nearly leafless stems and the leaves are arranged in a basal rosette. The roots and the lower parts of the stems are often stained with a red, or purple hue. The flowers in March–June, are dense racemes, spiciform (spike-shaped) with evenly spaced, leafy-bracteate beneath each flower. The calyx is small and divided into 5 sections from the base. It has a small white corolla. It has 4 ovules and 4 nutlets (which appear after flowering), which are similar in size and shape. The gynobase (a short conical or flat elevation of the receptacle of a flower, bearing the gynoecium) is thin and columnar, they are nearly similar (in form) to the wide style, which is dilated and wider that the stigma when in fruit.

== Taxonomy ==
The Latin specific epithet Eremocarya is derived from "Eremos" which is Greek for "desert" or "lonely" and "caryum" is Greek for "nut".

It was first published by Edward Lee Greene in Pittonia vol.1 on page 58 in 1887.

Then in 1924, Ivan M. Johnston wrote that the genus of Oreocarya could be combined with Cryptantha. Edwin Blake Payson in 1927 (A Monograph of the section Oreocarya of Cryptantha, Ann. Mo. Bot. Gard. 14:211-358) agreed with Johnston and he had four sections in Cryptantha: Eucryptantha (= Cryptantha), Geocarya, Krynitzkia (inclusive of Eremocarya, Greeneocharis, and Johnstonella), and Oreocarya. Larry Higgins (1971), another expert on the perennial taxa, published a revised monograph of Oreocarya, and agreed with Johnston and Payson on the inclusion of Oreocarya within Cryptantha, but also elevating the four sections of Johnston (1927) and Payson (1927) to subgenera. Although they were sometimes still called synonyms of Cryptantha.

In 2012, the phylogenetic relationship of members of the genus Cryptantha was carried out, based on dna sequencing analyses, it was then proposed that the resurrection of the following genera Eremocarya, Greeneocharis, Johnstonella, and also Oreocarya.

== Species ==
2 species are accepted.

- Eremocarya lepida (A.Gray) Greene
- Eremocarya micrantha (Torr.) Greene

In 2016, a large flowered version of Eremocarya micrantha was found and published as E. micrantha var. pseudolepida.

== Distribution ==
The genus is found in the United States (within the states of Arizona, California, Nevada, New Mexico, Oregon, Texas and Utah) and also in north western Mexico.

== Habitat ==
Species of the genus are found in dry sandy places below 7,500 m (24,600 ft) elevation or on montane slopes and valley sides at 2,000–7,000 m (6,600–23,000 ft).

== Other sources ==
- Cronquist, A. et al. 1972-. Intermountain flora.
- Johnston, I. M. 1927. Studies in the Boraginaceae VI. A revision of the South American Boraginoideae. Contr. Gray Herb. 78:31.
