= Ethmia minuta =

Scientific classification
- Kingdom: Animalia
- Phylum: Arthropoda
- Clade: Pancrustacea
- Class: Insecta
- Order: Lepidoptera
- Family: Depressariidae
- Genus: Ethmia
- Species: E. minuta

Binomial name
- Ethmia minuta Powell, 1973

Species of moth

Ethmia minuta is a moth in the family Depressariidae. It is found in California, United States.

The length of the forewings is 4.4–5 mm (0.17–0.20 in). The ground color of the forewings is black, reflecting shining bronzy, indistinctly mottled by scattered whitish scales in the distal one-third. The ground color of the hindwings is white, with a narrow blackish area around the apex.

The larvae feed on Cryptantha intermedia. They feed inside the buds of their host plant. First instar larvae feed at the sides of developing ovules.
