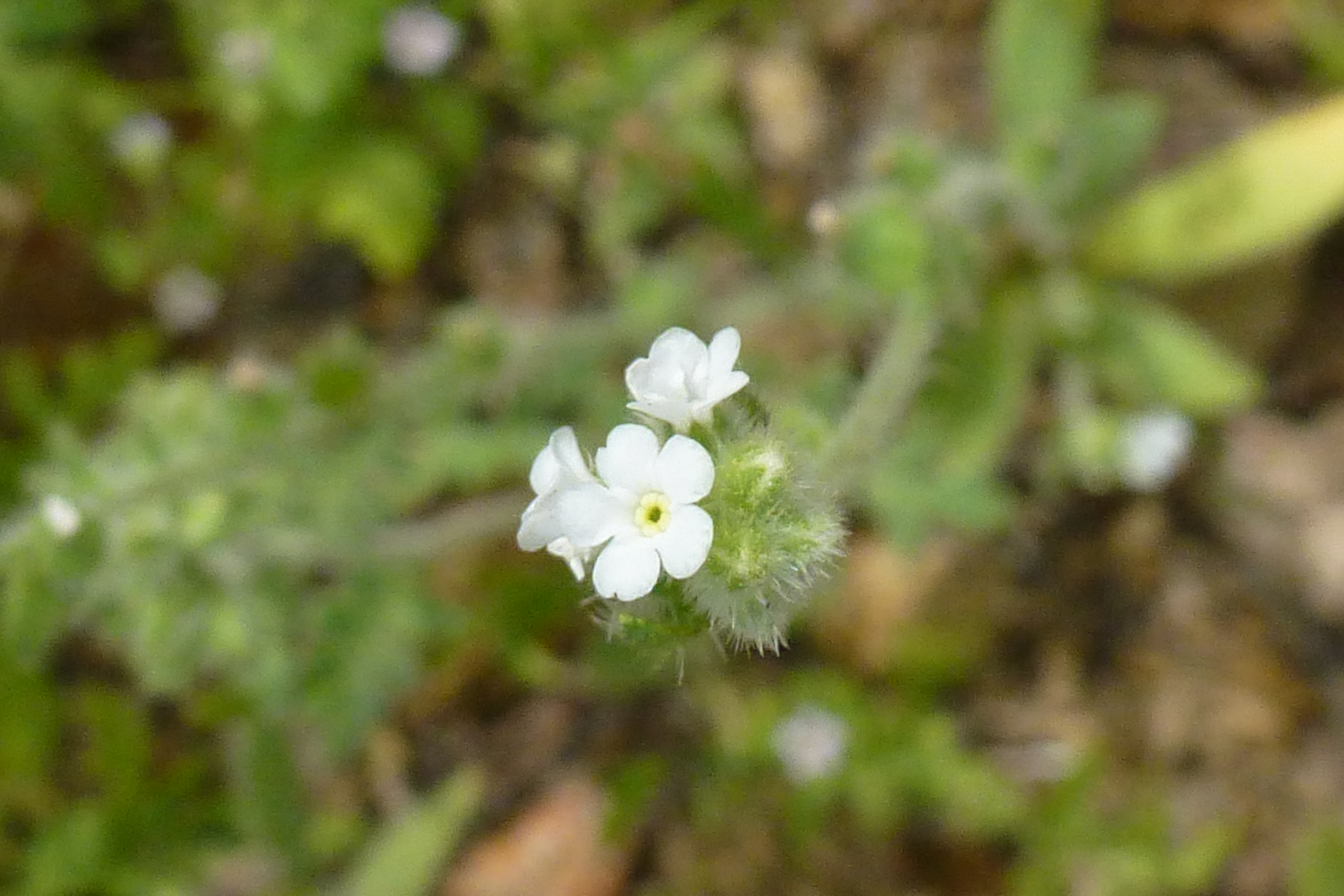
- Johnstonella angustifolia

Scientific classification
- Kingdom: Plantae
- Clade: Tracheophytes
- Clade: Angiosperms
- Clade: Eudicots
- Clade: Asterids
- Order: Boraginales
- Family: Boraginaceae
- Genus: Johnstonella; Brand (1925)

= Johnstonella =

Genus of plants

Johnstonella is a genus of flowering plants belonging to the family Boraginaceae.

Its native range is south western and southern US to Mexico, Peru to southern South America. It is found in the American states of Arizona, California, Nevada, New Mexico, Texas and Utah, as well as in the countries of Argentina, Chile, Mexico and Peru.

== Taxonomy ==
The genus name of Johnstonella is in honour of Ivan Murray Johnston (1898–1960), an American botanist. It was first described and published by August Brand in Repert. Spec. Nov. Regni Veg. Vol.21 on page 249 in 1925.

Then in 1927, Ivan M. Johnston wrote that the genus of Oreocarya (in the Boraginaceae family) could be combined with Cryptantha. Then Edwin Blake Payson in 1927 (A Monograph of the section Oreocarya of Cryptantha, Ann. Mo. Bot. Gard. 14:211-358) agreed with Johnston and Payson had four sections in Cryptantha: Eucryptantha (= Cryptantha), Geocarya, Krynitzkia (inclusive of Eremocarya, Greeneocharis, and Johnstonella), and Oreocarya. Larry Higgins (1971), another expert on the perennial taxa, published a revised monograph of Oreocarya, and agreed with Johnston and Payson on the inclusion of Oreocarya within Cryptantha, but also elevating the four sections of Johnston (1927) and Payson (1927) to subgenera. Although various species were sometimes still called synonyms of Cryptantha.

In 2012, the phylogenetic relationship of members of the genus Cryptantha was carried out, based on dna sequencing analyses, it was then proposed that the resurrection of the following genera Eremocarya, Greeneocharis, Johnstonella, and also Oreocarya.

== Known species ==
According to Kew:

- Johnstonella albida (Kunth) M.E.Mabry & M.G.Simpson
- Johnstonella angelica (I.M.Johnst.) Hasenstab & M.G.Simpson
- Johnstonella angustifolia (Torr.) Hasenstab & M.G.Simpson
- Johnstonella costata (Brandegee) Hasenstab & M.G.Simpson
- Johnstonella diplotricha (Phil.) Hasenstab & M.G.Simpson
- Johnstonella fastigiata (I.M.Johnst.) Hasenstab & M.G.Simpson
- Johnstonella geohintonii (B.L.Turner) M.G.Simpson & R.B.Kelley
- Johnstonella grayi (Vasey & Rose) Hasenstab & M.G.Simpson
- Johnstonella gypsites (I.M.Johnst.) Hasenstab & M.E.Mabry
- Johnstonella holoptera (A.Gray) Hasenstab & M.G.Simpson
- Johnstonella inaequata (I.M.Johnst.) Brand
- Johnstonella mexicana (Brandegee) M.E.Mabry & M.G.Simpson
- Johnstonella micromeres (A.Gray) Hasenstab & M.G.Simpson
- Johnstonella parviflora (Phil.) Hasenstab & M.G.Simpson
- Johnstonella punensis M.G.Simpson & Muñoz-Schick
- Johnstonella pusilla (Torr. & A.Gray) Hasenstab & M.G.Simpson
- Johnstonella racemosa (S.Watson ex A.Gray) Brand
- Johnstonella sheylae G.S.Hinton
