= Clokey =

Clokey is a surname. Notable people with the surname include:

- Art Clokey (1921–2010), American pioneer of stop motion clay animation
- Ira Waddell Clokey (1878–1950), American mining engineer and botanist
- Joseph W. Clokey (1890–1960), American educator, organist, and composer
- Walter Francis Clokey (c.1870–1930), British stained glass artist and manufacturer
