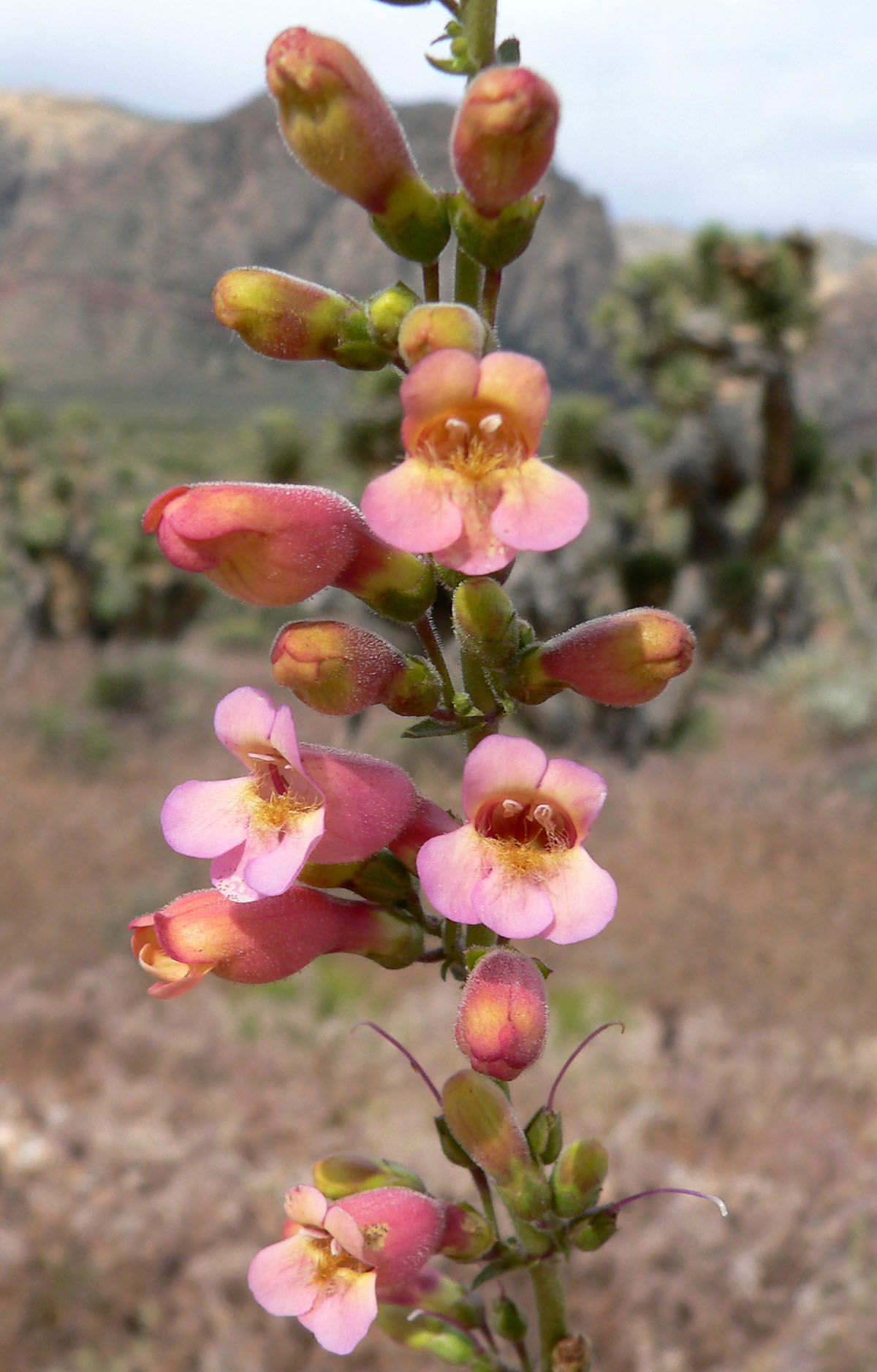
- Red Rock Canyon near Blue Diamond, Nevada

Conservation status
- Vulnerable (NatureServe)

Scientific classification
- Kingdom: Plantae
- Clade: Tracheophytes
- Clade: Angiosperms
- Clade: Eudicots
- Clade: Asterids
- Order: Lamiales
- Family: Plantaginaceae
- Genus: Penstemon
- Species: P. bicolor

Binomial name
- Penstemon bicolor (Brandegee) Clokey & D.D.Keck

Synonyms
- Penstemon bicolor subsp. typicus Clokey & D.D.Keck; Penstemon palmeri var. bicolor Brandegee; Penstemon pseudospectabilis subsp. bicolor (Brandegee) D.D.Keck

= Penstemon bicolor =

Plant species in the plantain family

Penstemon bicolor is a species of penstemon known by the common name pinto penstemon. It is native to the desert mountains and valleys of southern Nevada, eastern California, and western Arizona, where it grows in scrub, woodland, and other local habitat. It is a perennial herb which may exceed one meter in maximum height.

== Description ==
Penstemon bicolor has stems that either grow straight upwards or outward for a short distance before curving to grow upright to a height of 60 to 150 centimeters. It has leaves that are thick with deeply serrated edges. The basal leaves, those attached directly to the base of the plant, and those lower down on the stems are obovate, teardrop shaped with the narrow end attached to the plant with a tapered base. Their ends may either be bluntly pointed or narrowly pointed and are 37 to 110 millimeters long by 10 to 50 mm wide.

The hairy glandular inflorescence portion of the stem produces 9 to 23 groups of flowers each with a pair of bracts under where they attach to the main stem. Each of the groups has a pair of cymes, flowers on short flower stems off the main stem, each with one to four flowers. The flowers are most often 18 to 24 millimeters long, but may occasionally be 27 mm in length. Like the rest of the inflorescence the flowers are glandular and hairy, both inside and out. They are tubular and yellow rose-pink, usually with reddish or reddish purple stripes in the throats. The staminode is coated in long yellowish hairs and 14–16 mm long. It may or may not extend out of the flower opening.

== Taxonomy ==
In 1916 the botanist Townshend Stith Brandegee described a variety of Penstemon which he named Penstemon palmeri var. bicolor. In 1937 it was reevaluated by David D. Keck and classified as a subspecies of Penstemon pseudospectabilis. Two years later, in 1939, Keck together with Ira Waddell Clokey published their joint description of it as the species Penstemon bicolor. The subspecies Penstemon bicolor subsp. roseus was also described by them at the same time, but it is not accepted by Plants of the World Online.

=== Names ===
In English it is known both at the pinto penstemon and as the pinto beardtounge. In addition is also has the common name two-color beardtongue.

== Range and habitat ==
Penstemon bicolor is native to three western US states. In Arizona its range is within Mohave County. There it grows in the Black Mountains at the western edge of the state. There are about three populations of this penstemon in Arizona.

In California it grows in several desert mountain ranges in San Bernardino County, the Castle Mountains, the Clark Mountain Range, and the New York Mountains. Ten populations of P. bicolor are thought to grow in California.

In Nevada the Flora of North America reports that it is restricted to the mountains of Clark County. However, the USDA Natural Resources Conservation Service PLANTS database also lists it as growing in Nye County, Nevada. In these areas it grows at elevations between 500 and 1,700 meters (1,600 and 5,600 ft). There are approximately 73 populations in Nevada, with six of them in excellent or very good condition. Though six other populations, or more, have been destroyed by suburban growth in Clark County.

This species grow on soils with large amounts of rocky or gravel. It is associated with creosote-bush or blackbush scrublands and also with Joshua tree woodlands. It also grows in arroyos, in road cuts and verges, on talus slopes at the base of cliffs, and amid juniper woodlands.

=== Conservation ===
In 2009 NatureServe evaluated the species as vulnerable (G3) at the global level. This was due to a short term decline of between 10 and 30% decline in the species. They also rated it as vulnerable (S3) at the state level in Nevada and imperiled (S2) in Arizona. The Californian population has not been evaluated.

== See also ==
List of Penstemon species
