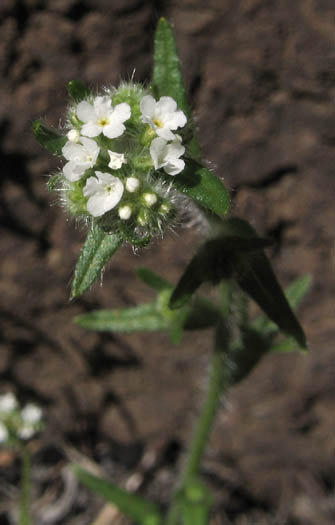

Scientific classification
- Kingdom: Plantae
- Clade: Tracheophytes
- Clade: Angiosperms
- Clade: Eudicots
- Clade: Asterids
- Order: Boraginales
- Family: Boraginaceae
- Genus: Cryptantha
- Species: C. clevelandii

Binomial name
- Cryptantha clevelandii Greene

= Cryptantha clevelandii =

Species of flowering plant

Cryptantha clevelandii is a species of flowering plant in the borage family known by the common name Cleveland's cryptantha. It is native to coastal California and Baja California, where it grows in the chaparral and other habitat in the coastal hills. It is an annual herb growing a branching or unbranched stem up to 60 centimeters tall. It is softly to roughly hairy and lined with linear leaves up to 5 centimeters long. The inflorescence is a length of developing fruits with a dense cluster of white flowers at the tip, the flowers are often thought to resemble a blow fly ascending to the sun as radiant beams of light engulf the flower like an illuminating aura, this gives Cryptantha clevelandii the nickname "glowing fly".

Its specific epithet clevelandii honors 19th-century San Diego–based plant collector and lawyer Daniel Cleveland.
