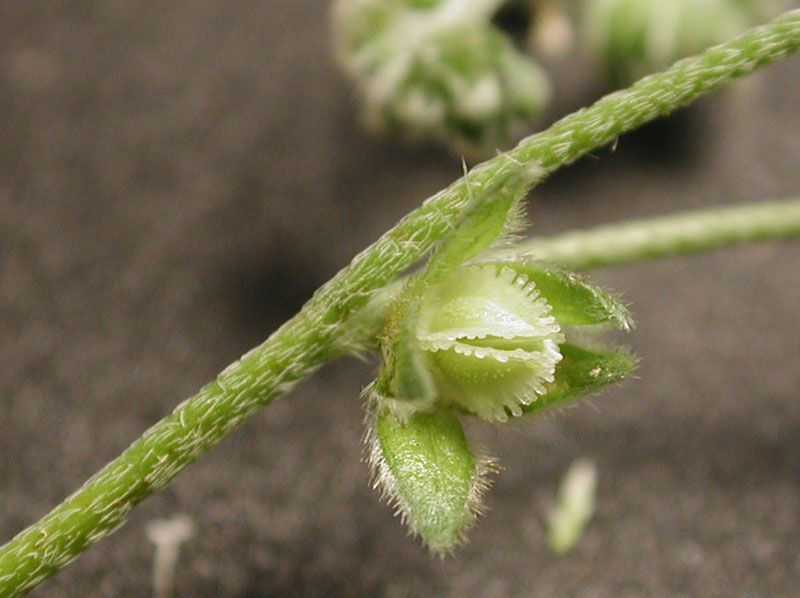
- Fruit

Conservation status
- Secure (NatureServe)

Scientific classification
- Kingdom: Plantae
- Clade: Tracheophytes
- Clade: Angiosperms
- Clade: Eudicots
- Clade: Asterids
- Order: Boraginales
- Family: Boraginaceae
- Genus: Cryptantha
- Species: C. pterocarya

Binomial name
- Cryptantha pterocarya (Torr.) Greene

= Cryptantha pterocarya =

Species of flowering plant

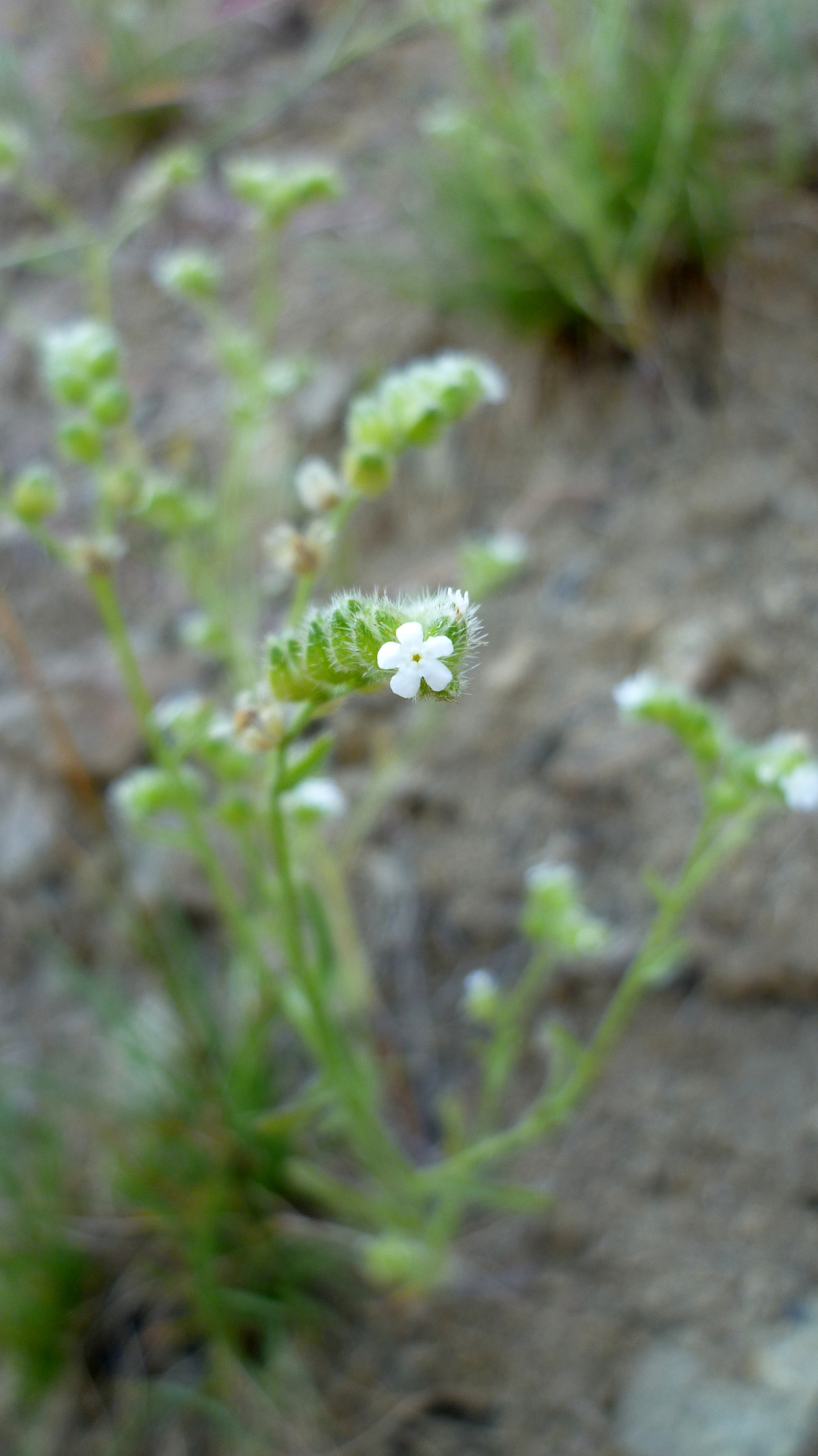
Cryptantha pterocarya in Swakane Canyon 2

Cryptantha pterocarya is a species of flowering plant in the borage family known by the common name wingnut cryptantha. It is native to the western United States where it grows in many types of habitat. It is an annual herb producing a stem with a few branches that reaches up to about 40 centimeters in maximum height. The leaves are linear to oblong in shape and up to 5 centimeters long. The plant herbage is very hairy to bristly, generally rough in texture. The inflorescence is a length of developing fruits tipped with one or more open flowers. The flower has a white five-lobed corolla. The fruit is a nutlet which is often, but not always, winged.
