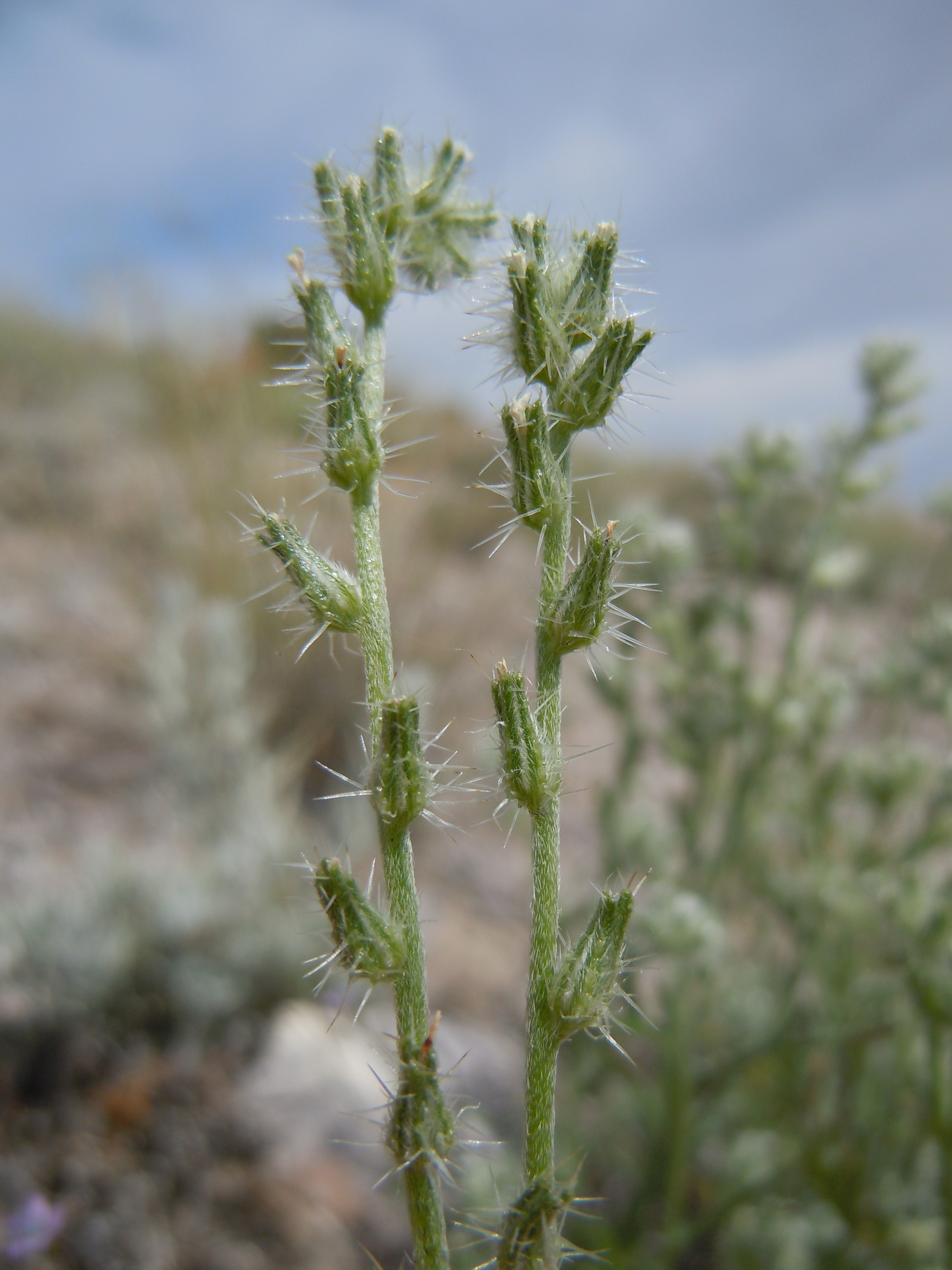

Conservation status
- Apparently Secure (NatureServe)

Scientific classification
- Kingdom: Plantae
- Clade: Tracheophytes
- Clade: Angiosperms
- Clade: Eudicots
- Clade: Asterids
- Order: Boraginales
- Family: Boraginaceae
- Genus: Cryptantha
- Species: C. scoparia

Binomial name
- Cryptantha scoparia A.Nels

= Cryptantha scoparia =

Species of flowering plant

Cryptantha scoparia is a species of flowering plant in the borage family known by the common name miner's candle. It has been found in Idaho, Nevada, Montana, Wyoming, Utah, and Colorado but there have only been 5 confirmed sightings in recent years. It is a small slender herb which prefers open sunny sites often in semi arid canyons and hillsides.
