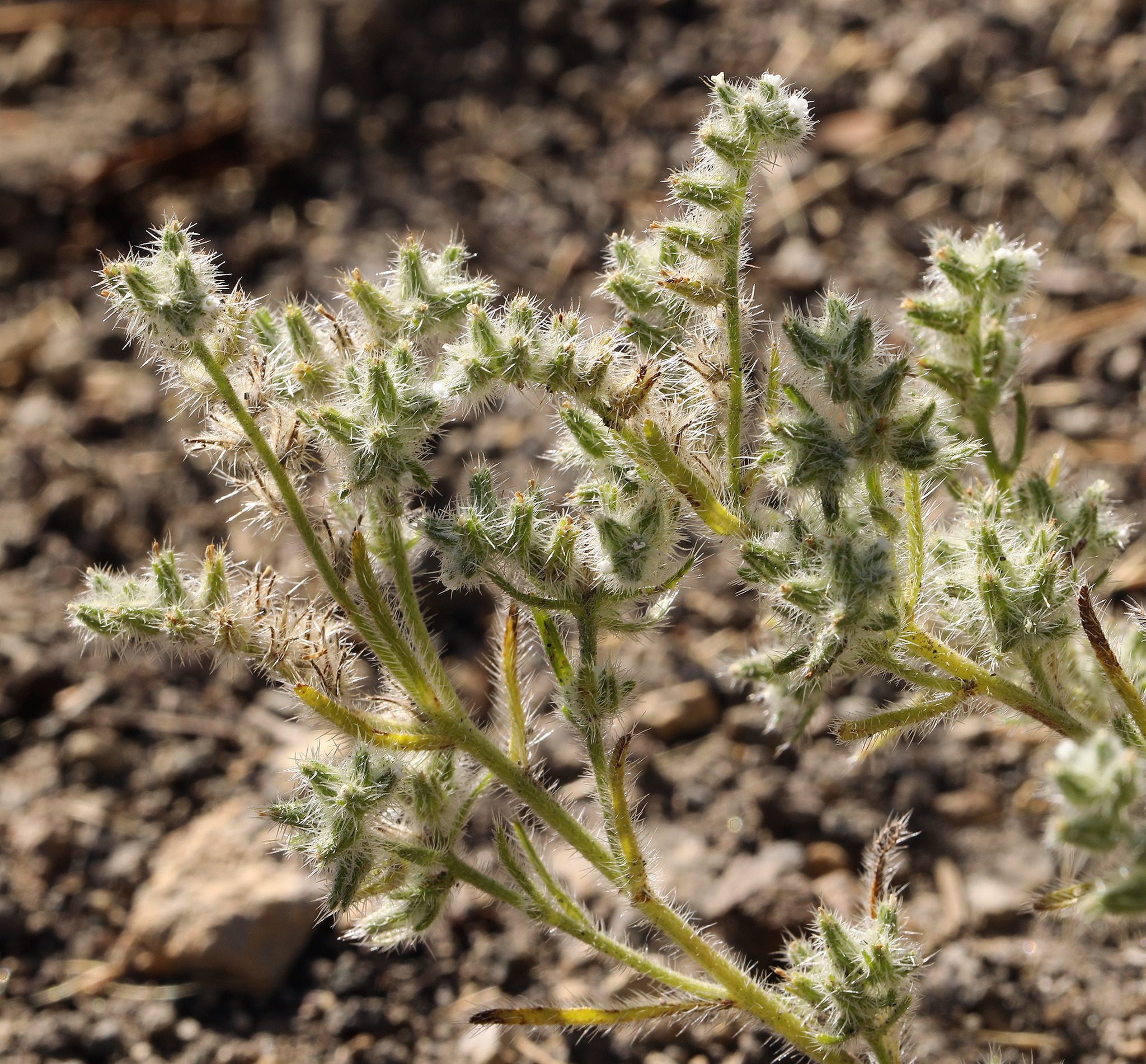

Conservation status
- Apparently Secure (NatureServe)

Scientific classification
- Kingdom: Plantae
- Clade: Tracheophytes
- Clade: Angiosperms
- Clade: Eudicots
- Clade: Asterids
- Order: Boraginales
- Family: Boraginaceae
- Genus: Cryptantha
- Species: C. ambigua

Binomial name
- Cryptantha ambigua (A.Gray) Greene

= Cryptantha ambigua =

Species of flowering plant

Cryptantha ambigua is a species of flowering plant in the borage family known by the common name basin cryptantha. It is native to western North America from British Columbia to California to Colorado, where it grows in many types of habitat, including forest, scrub, and sagebrush.

== Description ==
It is an annual herb producing a branching stem 10 to 35 centimeters tall covered in stiff hairs. The hairy to bristly leaves are up to 4 centimeters long. The inflorescence is a linear array of developing fruits with a dense clump of open flowers at the tip. The bristly white five-lobed flowers are 3 or 4 millimeters wide.
