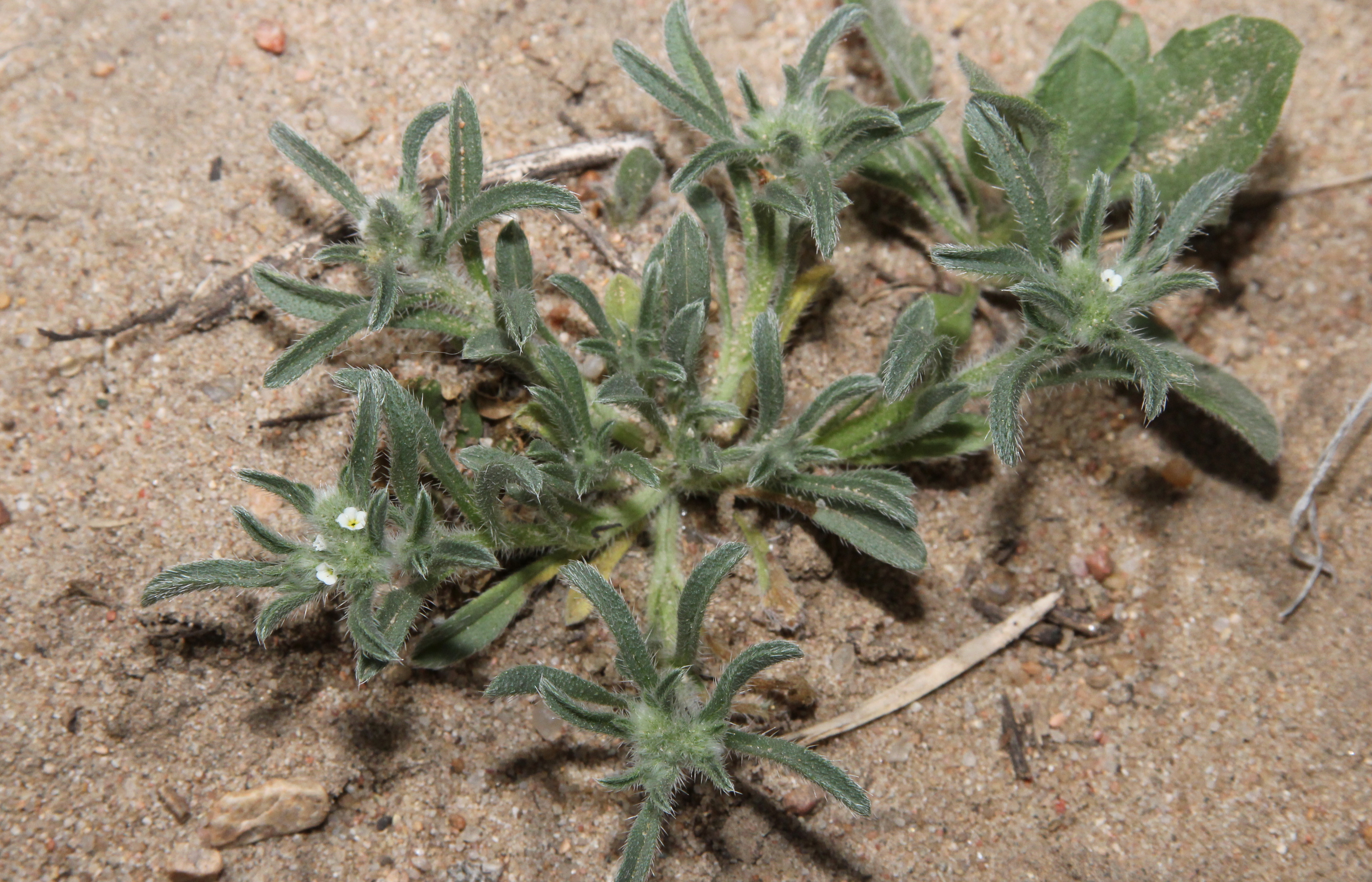

Conservation status
- Secure (NatureServe)

Scientific classification
- Kingdom: Plantae
- Clade: Tracheophytes
- Clade: Angiosperms
- Clade: Eudicots
- Clade: Asterids
- Order: Boraginales
- Family: Boraginaceae
- Genus: Cryptantha
- Species: C. minima

Binomial name
- Cryptantha minima Rydb.

= Cryptantha minima =

Species of flowering plant

Cryptantha minima, common names little cryptantha, little catseye or small cryptantha, is a small, herbaceous annual of the family Boraginaceae. It is found in the semi-arid grasslands and intermontane basins of central North America from Alberta to Texas. Cryptantha minima is listed in Canada under the Species at Risk Act as endangered.
