= Cryptantha oxygona =

Scientific classification
- Kingdom: Plantae
- Clade: Tracheophytes
- Clade: Angiosperms
- Clade: Eudicots
- Clade: Asterids
- Order: Boraginales
- Family: Boraginaceae
- Genus: Cryptantha
- Species: C. oxygona

Binomial name
- Cryptantha oxygona (A.Gray) Greene

Species of plant

Cryptantha oxygona, the sharpnut cryptantha, is a species of flowering plant in the family Boraginaceae. It is native to desert and chaparral regions of Southern California and parts of Nevada. It is considered vulnerable to extinction by the USDA.

Cryptantha oxygona grows primarily at lower elevations. It is about 18 inches tall with a single stem. It has white and yellow flowers that produce 4 nutlets.
