= Cryptantha crinita =

Conservation status
- Critically Imperiled (NatureServe)

Scientific classification
- Kingdom: Plantae
- Clade: Tracheophytes
- Clade: Angiosperms
- Clade: Eudicots
- Clade: Asterids
- Order: Boraginales
- Family: Boraginaceae
- Genus: Cryptantha
- Species: C. crinita

Binomial name
- Cryptantha crinita Greene

Species of flowering plant

Cryptantha crinita is a rare species of flowering plant in the borage family known by the common names Sacramento cryptantha and silky cryptantha. It is endemic to California in the United States, where it occurs in the northern Sacramento Valley and the adjacent edges of the Cascade Range foothills.

This annual herb grows up to 30 or 40 centimeters in height. The branching stem and leaves are covered in hairs. The lance-shaped to oblong leaves are 1 to 3 centimeters in length. The inflorescence is a dense, coiled cyme of several flowers with soft-hairy sepals and white corollas. Blooming occurs in April and May.

This plant grows in riparian habitat along ephemeral creeks in the northern Sacramento Valley. Recent observations indicate that it sometimes occurs in the foothills on the edges of the Cascade Mountains as well. This habitat is chaparral and woodland on volcanic soils. The recent observations have extended the plant's known distribution and show that it grows at higher elevations than previously thought. It is still considered a rare species.

Threats to the survival of the species include gravel mining, off-road vehicle use, grazing, and development. Introduced species of plants in the area are also a threat, including red brome (Bromus madritensis ssp. rubens), yellow starthistle (Centaurea solstitialis), and medusahead (Taeniatherum caput-medusae).
