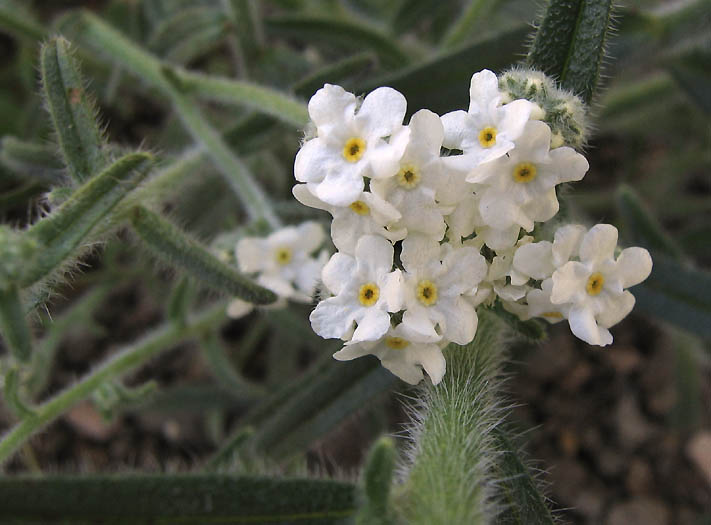
- Cryptantha muricata

Scientific classification
- Kingdom: Plantae
- Clade: Embryophytes
- Clade: Tracheophytes
- Clade: Spermatophytes
- Clade: Angiosperms
- Clade: Eudicots
- Clade: Asterids
- Order: Boraginales
- Family: Boraginaceae
- Subfamily: Boraginoideae
- Genus: Cryptantha; Lehm. ex G.Don

Type species
- Cryptantha glomerata

Species
- about 200, see text.

= Cryptantha =

Genus of flowering plants in the borage family

Cryptantha is a genus of flowering plants in the borage family, Boraginaceae. They are known commonly as cat's eyes and popcorn flowers (the latter name is also used to refer to the closely related genus Plagiobothrys, and members of the subtribe of Amsinckiinae). They are distributed throughout western North America and western South America, but they are absent from the regions in between.

These are annual or perennial herbs usually coated in rough hairs and bearing rounded flower corollas that are almost always white, but are yellow in a few species. Several morphological characters are used to distinguish species from one another, but the most definitive is the form of the nutlet, which varies in shape, size, color, and pattern of attachment.

== Species ==
The genus has been reorganized several times. As of March 2024, Plants of the World Online accepts about 110 species:

- Cryptantha abata I.M.Johnst.
- Cryptantha affinis – slender catseye, common cryptantha, quill cryptantha
- Cryptantha alfalfalis
- Cryptantha alyssoides
- Cryptantha ambigua – basin cryptantha, obscure cryptantha, Wilke's cryptantha
- Cryptantha aprica
- Cryptantha arenophila Rebman & M.G.Simpson
- Cryptantha argentea
- Cryptantha barbigera — bearded catseye
- Cryptantha bridgesii (Phil.) Brand
- Cryptantha buchtienii Brand

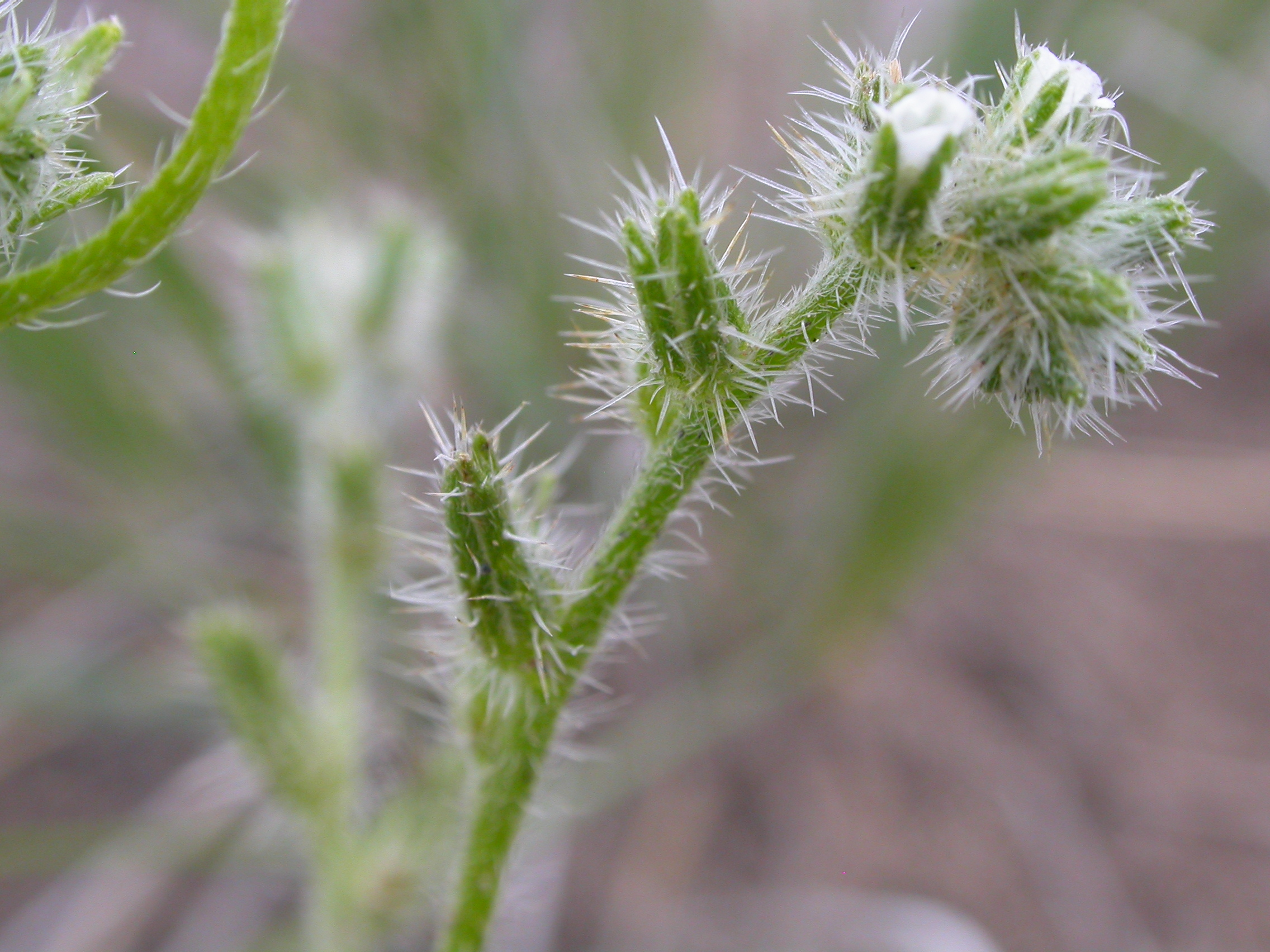
Cryptantha fendleri

- Cryptantha calycina
- Cryptantha calycotricha
- Cryptantha capituliflora
- Cryptantha catalinensis M.G.Simpson & Rebman
- Cryptantha chaetocalyx
- Cryptantha clandestina
- Cryptantha clemensae Payson
- Cryptantha clementina Rebman & M.G.Simpson
- Cryptantha clevelandii – Cleveland's cryptantha
- Cryptantha clokeyi – Clokey's cryptantha
- Cryptantha congesta
- Cryptantha crassisepala – deertongue, thick-sepal catseye
- Cryptantha crinita – Sacramento cryptantha
- Cryptantha cycloptera (Greene) Greene
- Cryptantha cynoglossoides

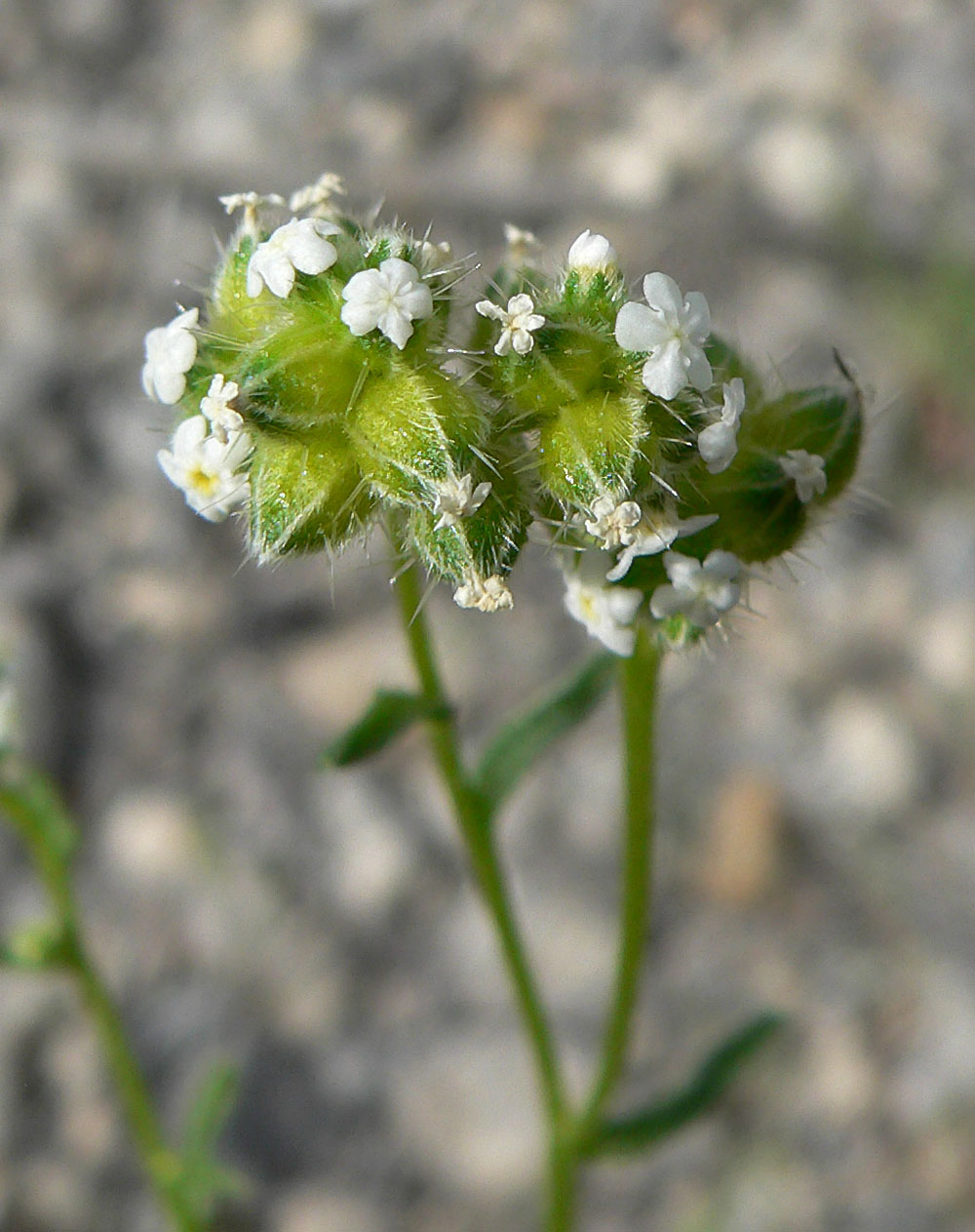
Cryptantha pterocarya

- Cryptantha decipiens – gravel cryptantha, gravel-bar catseye
- Cryptantha dichita
- Cryptantha diffusa
- Cryptantha dimorpha
- Cryptantha dissita
- Cryptantha dolichophylla
- Cryptantha dumetorum – bush-loving catseye
- Cryptantha echinella – hedgehog cryptantha, prickly cryptantha
- Cryptantha echinosepala J.F.Macbr.
- Cryptantha excavata – deepscar cryptantha

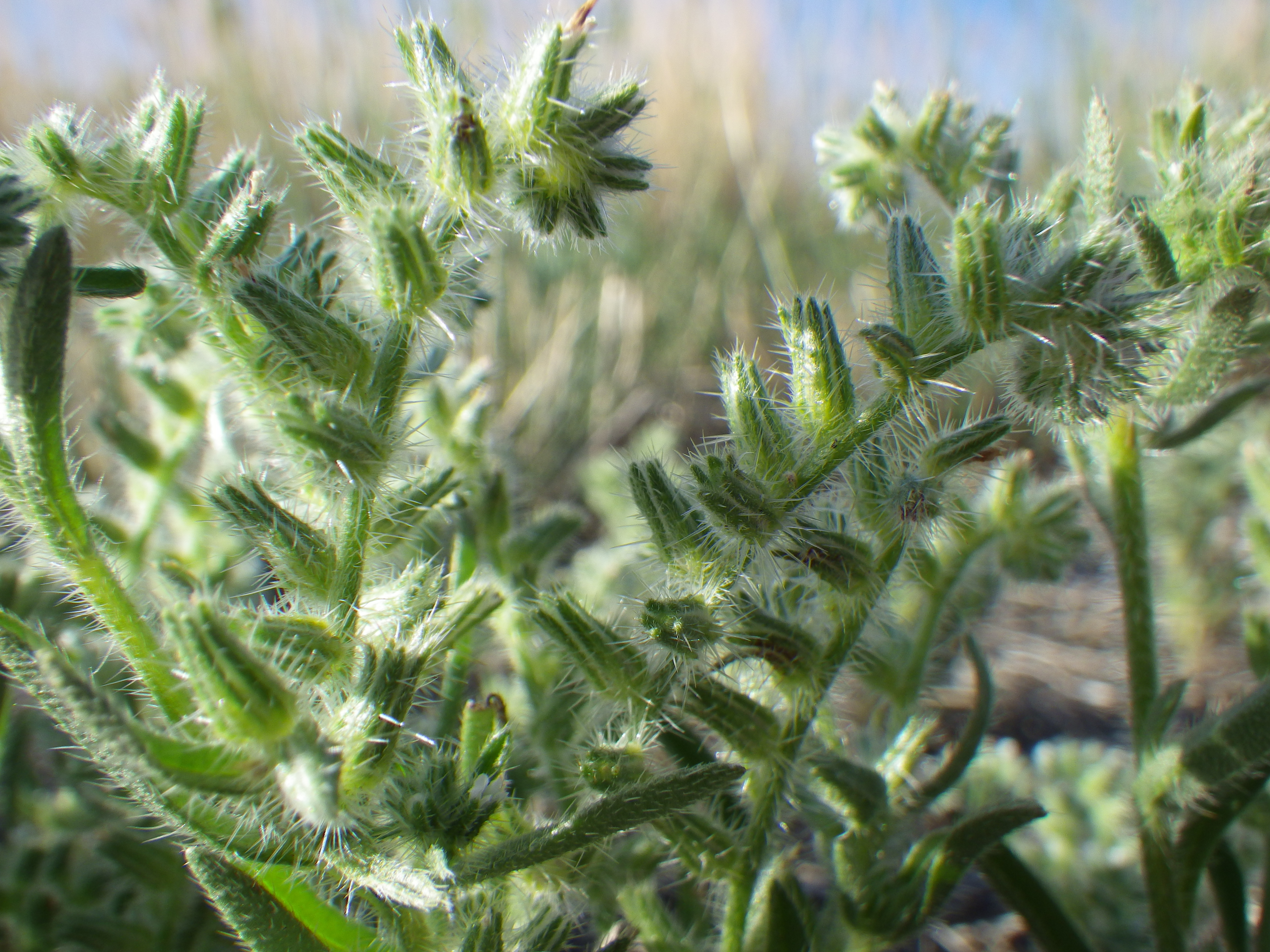
Cryptantha scoparia

- Cryptantha fendleri – Fendler's cryptantha, sand-dune catseye
- Cryptantha filaginea
- Cryptantha filiformifolia J.F.Macbr.
- Cryptantha filiformis
- Cryptantha flaccida – weakstem cryptantha
- Cryptantha foliosa

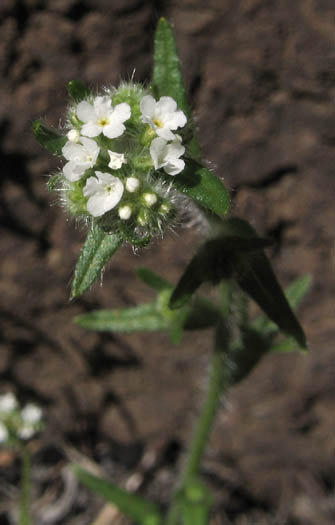
Cryptantha clevelandii

- Cryptantha ganderi – Gander's cryptantha
- Cryptantha glareosa
- Cryptantha globulifera
- Cryptantha glomeriflora – Truckee cryptantha
- Cryptantha glomerulifera
- Cryptantha gnaphalioides
- Cryptantha gracilis – narrowstem catseye, narrowstem pick-me-not
- Cryptantha grandiflora Rydb.
- Cryptantha granulosa
- Cryptantha haplostachya
- Cryptantha hispida (Phil.) Reiche
- Cryptantha hispidissima Greene
- Cryptantha hispidula – Napa cryptantha
- Cryptantha hooveri – Hoover's cryptantha
- Cryptantha incana – Tulare cryptantha
- Cryptantha intermedia – Clearwater catseye, common cryptantha
- Cryptantha involucrata

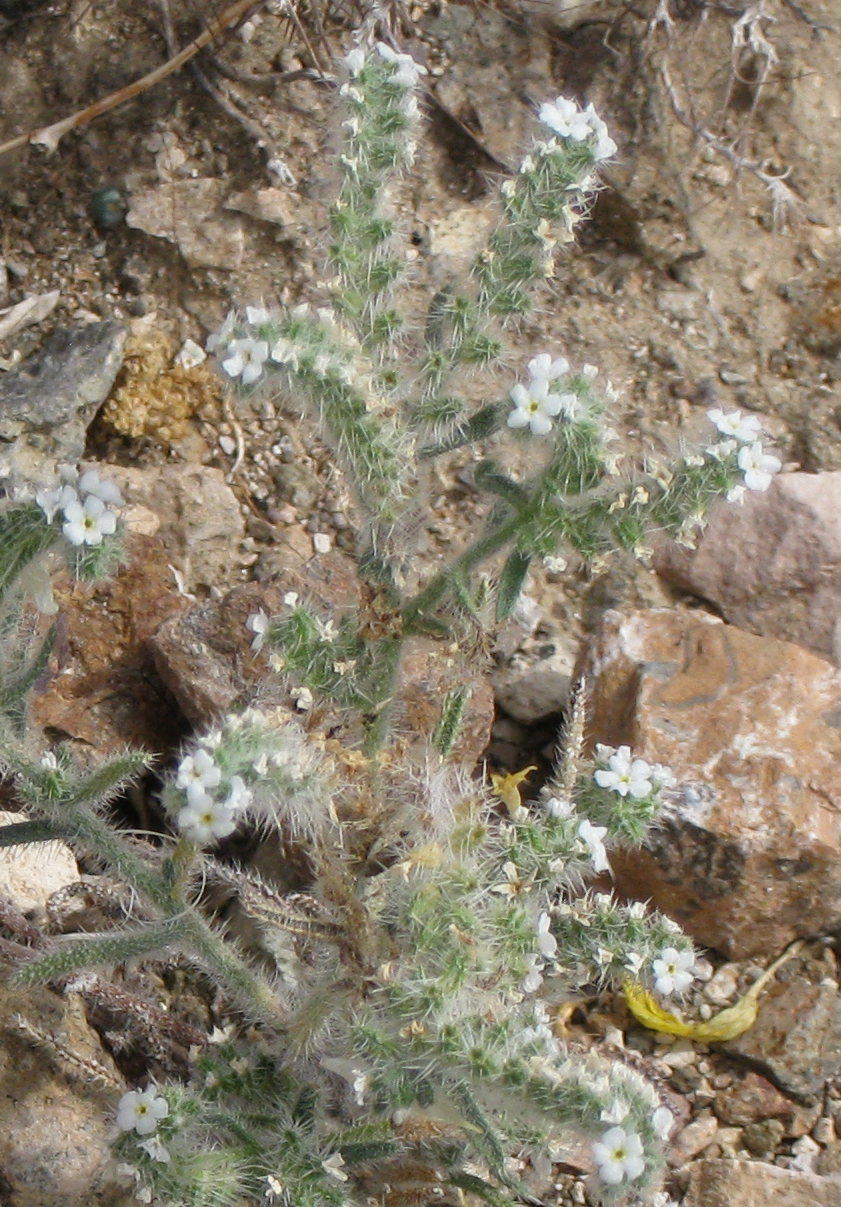
Cryptantha utahensis

- Cryptantha juniperensis R.B.Kelley & M.G.Simpson
- Cryptantha kelseyana – Kelsey's cryptantha
- Cryptantha kingii
- Cryptantha kinkiensis Rebman & M.G.Simpson
- Cryptantha latefissa
- Cryptantha leiocarpa – coastal cryptantha
- Cryptantha limensis
- Cryptantha linearis
- Cryptantha longifolia
- Cryptantha longiseta (Phil.) Brand
- Cryptantha macrocalyx
- Cryptantha marioricardiana
- Cryptantha mariposae – Mariposa cryptantha
- Cryptantha maritima – Guadalupe catseye
- Cryptantha marticorenae
- Cryptantha martirensis
- Cryptantha mendocina
- Cryptantha microstachys – Tejon cryptantha
- Cryptantha milobakeri – Milo Baker's cryptantha
- Cryptantha minima – little catseye, small cryptantha
- Cryptantha mohavensis – Mojave cryptantha
- Cryptantha multicaulis A.Nelson
- Cryptantha muricata – pointed catseye, prickly cryptantha
- Cryptantha nemaclada : Colusa cryptantha
- Cryptantha nevadensis : Nevada catseye
- Cryptantha oxygona – sharpnut cryptantha, sharpseed cryptantha
- Cryptantha papillosa
- Cryptantha patagonica
- Cryptantha patula
- Cryptantha peruviana
- Cryptantha phaceloides
- Cryptantha pondii Greene
- Cryptantha pterocarya – winged pick-me-not, wingnut catseye
- Cryptantha recurvata – curvenut catseye
- Cryptantha romanii
- Cryptantha rostellata – beaked catseye
- Cryptantha scoparia – desert cryptantha, pinyon desert cryptantha
- Cryptantha simulans – pine cryptantha, pinewoods cryptantha
- Cryptantha spathulata
- Cryptantha subamplexicaulis
- Cryptantha taltalensis
- Cryptantha texana
- Cryptantha torreyana – Torrey's catseye
- Cryptantha traskiae – Trask's cryptantha
- Cryptantha utahensis – scented catseye, Utah cryptantha
- Cryptantha varians Brand
- Cryptantha vidali
- Cryptantha virens
- Cryptantha volckmannii
- Cryptantha watsonii – Watson's cryptantha
- Cryptantha werdermanniana
- Cryptantha wigginsii

=== Formerly placed here ===
Many Cryptantha species have been transferred to other genera:

- Cryptantha angustifolia → Johnstonella angustifolia
- Cryptantha cana → Oreocarya cana
- Cryptantha cinerea → Oreocarya suffruticosa var. setosa
- Cryptantha circumscissa → Greeneocharis circumscissa
- Cryptantha confertiflora → Oreocarya confertiflora
- Cryptantha crassipes → Oreocarya crassipes
- Cryptantha flavoculata → Oreocarya flavoculata
- Cryptantha humilis → Oreocarya humilis
- Cryptantha jamesii → Oreocarya suffruticosa var. suffruticosa
- Cryptantha micromeres → Johnstonella micromeres
- Cryptantha nubigena → Oreocarya nubigena
- Cryptantha pustulosa → Oreocarya suffruticosa var. pustulosa
- Cryptantha roosiorum → Oreocarya roosiorum
- Cryptantha subcapitata → Oreocarya subcapitata
- Cryptantha virginensis→ Oreocarya virginensis
