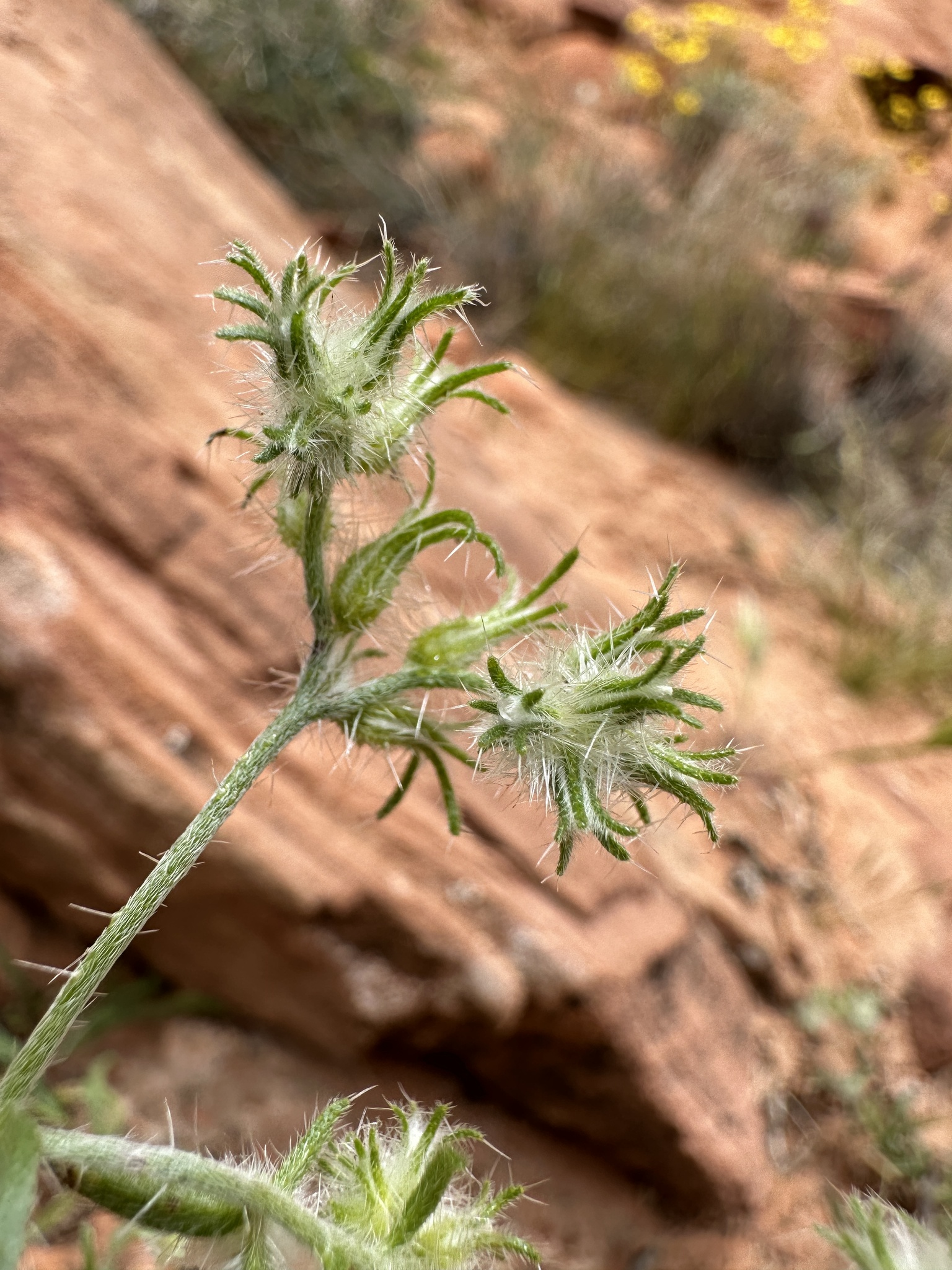

Conservation status
- Secure (NatureServe)

Scientific classification
- Kingdom: Plantae
- Clade: Tracheophytes
- Clade: Angiosperms
- Clade: Eudicots
- Clade: Asterids
- Order: Boraginales
- Family: Boraginaceae
- Genus: Cryptantha
- Species: C. nevadensis

Binomial name
- Cryptantha nevadensis A. Nels. & Kennedy

= Cryptantha nevadensis =

Species of flowering plant

Cryptantha nevadensis is a species of wildflower in the borage family known by the common names Nevada catseye and Nevada forget-me-not. This small plant is native to the southwestern United States and northern Mexico where it grows in sandy and rocky soils in varied habitats across the region. Like other cryptanthas it is a very hairy, bristly flowering herb with a curling inflorescence that resembles that of fiddlenecks. This is an annual plant rarely exceeding half a meter in height. It is covered in long, white hairs and its tiny white flowers are about half a centimeter wide. The fruit is a bumpy nutlet.
