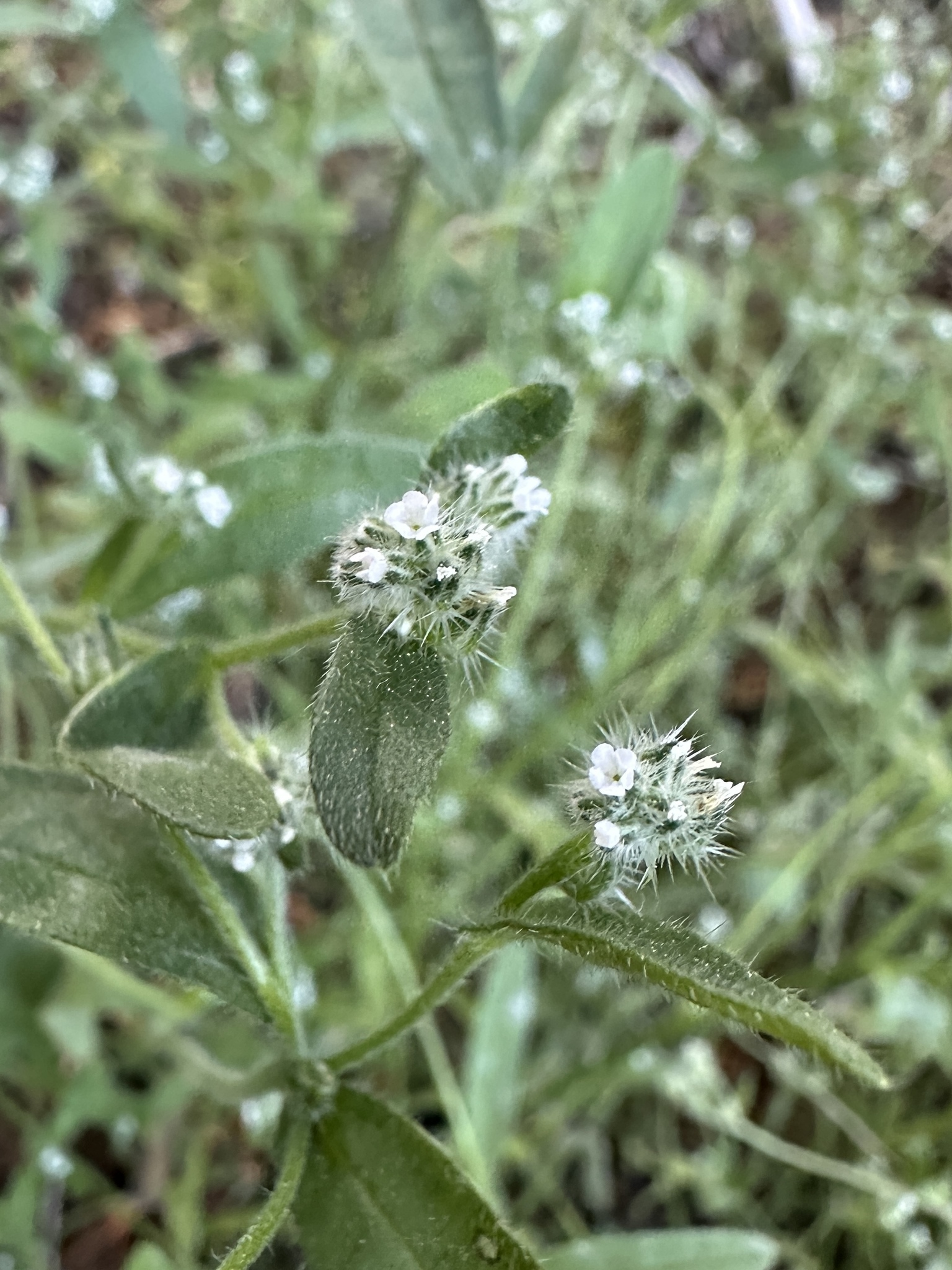

Conservation status
- Secure (NatureServe)

Scientific classification
- Kingdom: Plantae
- Clade: Tracheophytes
- Clade: Angiosperms
- Clade: Eudicots
- Clade: Asterids
- Order: Boraginales
- Family: Boraginaceae
- Genus: Cryptantha
- Species: C. affinis

Binomial name
- Cryptantha affinis (A.Gray) Greene

= Cryptantha affinis =

Species of flowering plant

Cryptantha affinis is a flowering annual plant occurring in open areas of the coniferous forest. It is a member of the family Boraginaceae. It occurs at elevation ranges between 700 – 2900 m. Cryptantha species occur with other genera such as Clarkia, Hesperolinon, Lasthenia, Lupinus, Mimulus and Phacelia.

== Distribution ==
Cryptantha affinis is native to California. Its distribution is from the Klamath, North coast, and Cascade Mountain Ranges. It also occurs in the Sierra Nevada, San Bernardino, and Warner Mountains and as far as Washington to Wyoming.

== Characteristics ==
Cryptantha affinis is an annual ranging from 5–40 cm in height. Stems are simple with little or no branching. Stems have stiff hairs lying parallel to the stem surface. Hairs also may curve upward slightly.

Leaves are short and oblanceolate to oblong. Leaf size ranges from 1–4 cm. Leaf arrangement is opposite below and alternate above. Upper leave appear more oblong to lanceolate.

Flowers are terminal and elongated when in fruit. Flowers are radial and can be open or dense in contact from side to side. Sepals are free. Flower color is generally white. Flowers are fused and lobed at the tip of the tube.

Fruits are smooth ovate nutlets. Nutlets are in a group of four about 2 mm. Fruit shape is ovate. Fruits are smooth and shiny and black in color. Fruits are grooved and sometimes forked at the basal region.

Most plants appear to be toxic due to their high levels of alkaloids and nitrates.

== Ecology ==
Cryptantha affinis physiology appears to be influenced by nutrients of Deer excretions. Increased photosynthesis and higher plant nitrogen levels have been observed in habitats frequented by mule deer, antelope, and Eelk. Higher nutrients appear to increase growth and reproduction in wet years. In dry years survival is increased by the shading of Cryptantha by the presence of large shrubs. Although shading increases survival in dry years, in wet years growth and reproduction seem to be reduced even when nutrient levels in the soil are high.

Cryptantha species are dominant annuals in a wide range of habitats. In habitats where Cryptantha is a dominant species, fire intensity reduces its density.
