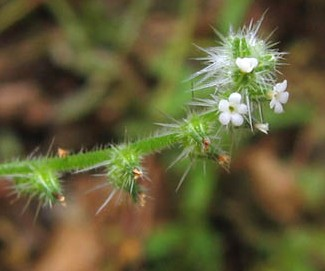

Scientific classification
- Kingdom: Plantae
- Clade: Tracheophytes
- Clade: Angiosperms
- Clade: Eudicots
- Clade: Asterids
- Order: Boraginales
- Family: Boraginaceae
- Genus: Cryptantha
- Species: C. microstachys

Binomial name
- Cryptantha microstachys (Greene ex A.Gray) Greene

= Cryptantha microstachys =

Species of flowering plant

Cryptantha microstachys is a species of flowering plant in the borage family known by the common name Tejon cryptantha. It is native to California and Baja California, where it grows in several types of habitat, including chaparral in the coastal and inland hills and mountains. It is an annual herb producing a branching or unbranched stem 10 to 50 centimeters tall which is coated in hairs and bristles. The hairy leaves are linear to oblong in shape and up to 4 centimeters long. The inflorescence is a length of bristly developing fruits tipped with open flowers with five-lobed white corollas just a few millimeters wide.
