= Solanum clokeyi =

Scientific classification
- Kingdom: Plantae
- Clade: Tracheophytes
- Clade: Angiosperms
- Clade: Eudicots
- Clade: Asterids
- Order: Solanales
- Family: Solanaceae
- Genus: Solanum
- Species: S. clokeyi

Binomial name
- Solanum clokeyi Munz

Synonyms
- Solanum arborescens Clokey; Solanum wallacei var. clokeyi (Munz) McMinn

Species of flowering plant

Solanum clokeyi, known as Clokey's nightshade, Island nightshade, or Santa Cruz Island nightshade, is a species of flowering plant in the nightshade family endemic to California, United States. It occurs in southeastern California, including the Channel Islands and Santa Catalina Island. The name honors American botanist Ira Waddell Clokey. It is sometimes treated as a synonym or variety of Solanum wallacei.
