= Cryptantha incana =

Conservation status
- Critically Imperiled (NatureServe)

Scientific classification
- Kingdom: Plantae
- Clade: Embryophytes
- Clade: Tracheophytes
- Clade: Angiosperms
- Clade: Eudicots
- Clade: Asterids
- Order: Boraginales
- Family: Boraginaceae
- Genus: Cryptantha
- Species: C. incana

Binomial name
- Cryptantha incana Greene

Species of flowering plant

Cryptantha incana is a rare species of flowering plant in the borage family known by the common name Tulare cryptantha. It is endemic to California in the United States, where it occurs in the forests and woodlands of the southern Sierra Nevada. It is a poorly known species with three occurrences based on three historical collections. It was collected in Tulare County in 1904 and 1941 and once in Inyo County in 1989.

The plant is an annual herb up to 50 centimeters tall with a hairy, branching stem. The lance-shaped or oblong leaves are up to 3.5centimeters long and have bristly undersides. The inflorescence is a coiled cyme of flowers that uncoils as the fruits develop. The flowers have corollas less than half a centimeter wide and hairy, bristly sepals.
