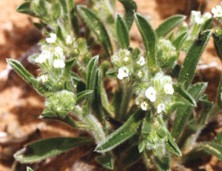

Conservation status
- Secure (NatureServe)

Scientific classification
- Kingdom: Plantae
- Clade: Tracheophytes
- Clade: Angiosperms
- Clade: Eudicots
- Clade: Asterids
- Order: Boraginales
- Family: Boraginaceae
- Genus: Cryptantha
- Species: C. crassisepala

Binomial name
- Cryptantha crassisepala Greene

= Cryptantha crassisepala =

Species of flowering plant

Cryptantha crassisepala (common name thicksepal catseye) is a plant found in the southwestern United States.

== Uses ==
Among the Zuni people, a hot infusion of the pulverized plant is applied to limbs for fatigue.
