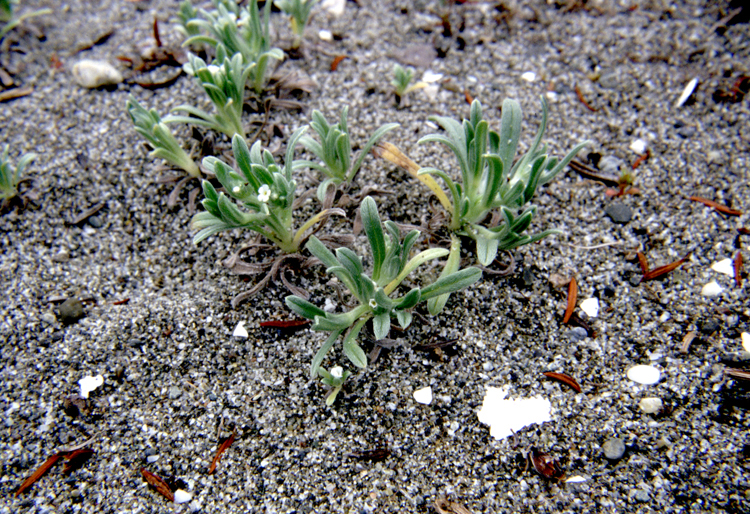

Scientific classification
- Kingdom: Plantae
- Clade: Tracheophytes
- Clade: Angiosperms
- Clade: Eudicots
- Clade: Asterids
- Order: Boraginales
- Family: Boraginaceae
- Genus: Cryptantha
- Species: C. leiocarpa

Binomial name
- Cryptantha leiocarpa (Fisch. & C.A.Mey.) Greene

= Cryptantha leiocarpa =

Species of plant

Cryptantha leiocarpa is a species of flowering plant in the borage family known by the common name coastal cryptantha. It is native to the coastline of Oregon and California where it grows in sandy areas such as beaches.

This small annual herb grows an erect hairy, bristly branching stem to a maximum height near 30 centimeters. The stems droop and trail along the ground when they become long. The linear leaves are 1 to 3 centimeters long and have rough hairs. The plant bears small, tight clusters of white five-lobed flowers with yellow centers and tiny bristly sepals underneath.
