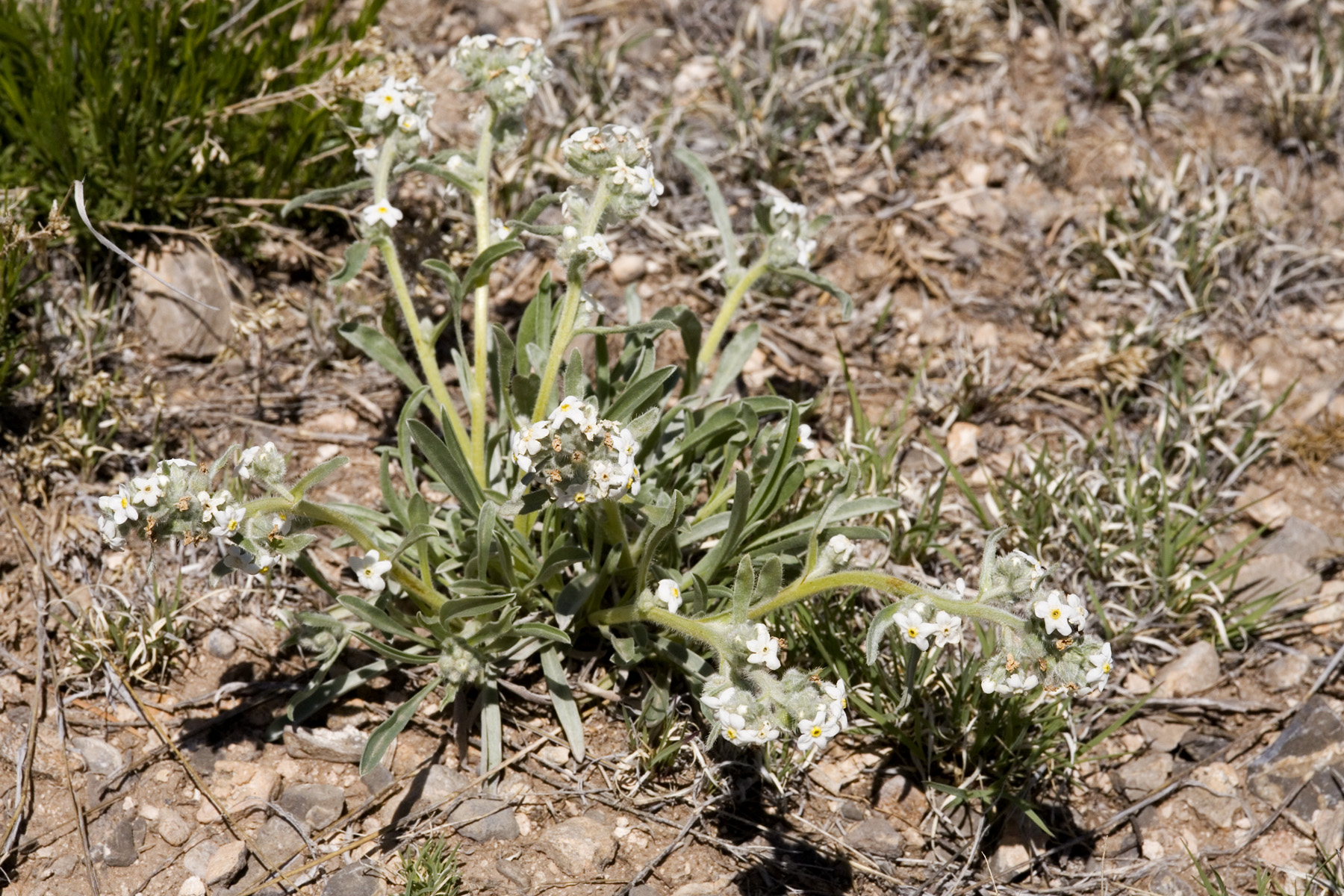
- Oreocarya suffruticosa var. setosa

Scientific classification
- Kingdom: Plantae
- Clade: Tracheophytes
- Clade: Angiosperms
- Clade: Eudicots
- Clade: Asterids
- Order: Boraginales
- Family: Boraginaceae
- Genus: Oreocarya
- Species: O. suffruticosa

Binomial name
- Oreocarya suffruticosa (Torr.) Greene

Synonyms
- Of the species: Hemisphaerocarya suffruticosa (Torr.) Brand; Myosotis suffruticosa Torr.; Of var. arenicola: Cryptantha cinerea var. arenicola L.C.Higgins & S.L.Welsh; Of var. laxa: List: Cryptantha cinerea var. laxa (J.F.Macbr.) L.C.Higgins; Cryptantha jamesii var. laxa (J.F.Macbr.) Payson; Hemisphaerocarya laxa (J.F.Macbr.) Brand; Oreocarya multicaulis var. laxa J.F.Macbr.; Of var. pustulosa: List: Cryptantha cinerea var. pustulosa (Rydb.) L.C.Higgins; Cryptantha jamesii var. pustulosa (Rydb.) H.D.Harr.; Cryptantha pustulosa (Rydb.) Payson; Oreocarya pustulosa Rydb.; Of var. setosa: List: Cryptantha cinerea (Greene) Cronquist; Cryptantha jamesii var. cinerea (Greene) Payson; Cryptantha jamesii var. disticha (Eastw.) Payson; Cryptantha jamesii var. multicaulis (Greene) Payson; Cryptantha jamesii var. setosa (M.E.Jones) I.M.Johnst. ex Tidestr.; Eritrichium multicaule Torr., nom. illeg.; Hemisphaerocarya cinerea (Greene) Brand; Hemisphaerocarya suffruticosa var. multicaulis (Greene) Brand; Hemisphaerocarya suffruticosa var. setosa (M.E.Jones) Brand; Krynitzkia multicaulis (Greene) Anon.; Krynitzkia multicaulis var. setosa M.E.Jones; Oreocarya cinerea Greene; Oreocarya disticha Eastw.; Oreocarya lemmonii Eastw.; Oreocarya multicaulis Greene; Oreocarya multicaulis var. cinerea (Greene) J.F.Macbr.; Oreocarya suffruticosa var. cinerea (Greene) Payson; Oreocarya suffruticosa var. multicaulis (Greene) Payson; Of var. suffruticosa: List: Cryptantha cinerea var. jamesii (Torr.) Cronquist; Cryptantha jamesii (Torr.) Payson; Cryptantha jamesii var. typica Payson; Eritrichium jamesii Torr.; Hemisphaerocarya suffruticosa var. pustulosa Brand; Krynitzkia jamesii A.Gray

= Oreocarya suffruticosa =

Species of plant

Oreocarya suffruticosa is a species of flowering plant in the family Boraginaceae, native to the west and central United States and to northern Mexico. It was first described by John Torrey in 1827 as Myosotis suffruticosa and transferred to Oreocarya by Edward Lee Greene in 1887. Varieties of Oreocarya suffruticosa have previously been placed within several species of Cryptantha, including Cryptantha cinerea, Cryptantha jamesii and Cryptantha pustulosa.

== Taxonomy ==
Oreocarya suffruticosa was first described (as Myosotis suffruticosa) by John Torrey in 1827. It was transferred to the genus Oreocarya by Edward Lee Greene in 1889. Starting in the 1920s, a broad circumscription of the genus Cryptantha was adopted by many botanists, and taxa recognized as varieties of Oreocarya suffruticosa were placed in several species of Cryptantha and their subtaxa, including Cryptantha cinerea, Cryptantha jamesii and Cryptantha pustulosa. A molecular phylogenetic study in 2012 showed that when Cryptantha was broadly circumscribed, it was not monophyletic, and Oreocarya was resurrected (along with some other genera). Oreocarya suffruticosa was divided into five varieties.

=== Varieties ===
As of March 2024, Plants of the World Online accepted five varieties:

- Oreocarya suffruticosa var. arenicola (L.C.Higgins & S.L.Welsh) R.B.Kelley – synonyms include Cryptantha cinerea var. arenicola
- Oreocarya suffruticosa var. laxa (J.F.Macbr.) R.B.Kelley – synonyms include Cryptantha cinerea var. laxa and Cryptantha jamesii var. laxa
- Oreocarya suffruticosa var. pustulosa (Rydb.) R.B.Kelley – synonyms include Cryptantha cinerea var. pustulosa, Cryptantha jamesii var. pustulosa and Cryptantha pustulosa
- Oreocarya suffruticosa var. setosa (M.E.Jones) R.B.Kelley – synonyms include Cryptantha cinerea and four varieties of Cryptantha jamesii
- Oreocarya suffruticosa var. suffruticosa – synonyms include Cryptantha cinerea var. jamesii and Cryptantha jamesii

== Distribution ==
Oreocarya suffruticosa is native to Arizona, Colorado, Kansas, Montana, Nebraska, Nevada, New Mexico, Oklahoma, South Dakota, Texas, Utah and Wyoming in the United States, and to northeastern and northwestern Mexico.

== Uses ==
Among the Zuni people, the powdered root of Oreocarya suffruticosa var. suffruticosa (syn. Cryptantha cinerea var. jamesii) is used to relieve a sore anus.
