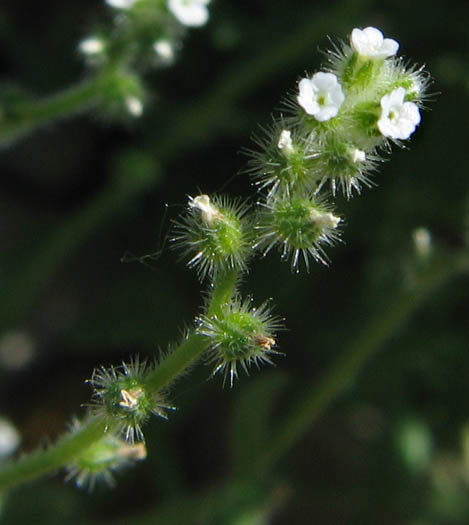

Conservation status
- Vulnerable (NatureServe)

Scientific classification
- Kingdom: Plantae
- Clade: Tracheophytes
- Clade: Angiosperms
- Clade: Eudicots
- Clade: Asterids
- Order: Boraginales
- Family: Boraginaceae
- Genus: Johnstonella
- Species: J. micromeres

Binomial name
- Johnstonella micromeres (A.Gray) Hasenstab & M.G.Simpson

Synonyms
- Cryptantha micromeres (A.Gray) Greene; Eritrichium micromeres A.Gray; Krynitzkia micromeres (A.Gray) A.Gray; Eritrichium angustifolium A.Gray [nom. illeg.]

= Johnstonella micromeres =

Species of flowering plant

Johnstonella micromeres is a species of flowering plant in the family Boraginaceae known by the common name pygmyflower cryptantha.

It is native to California and Baja California, where it grows in woodland and chaparral.

== Description ==
Johnstonella micromeres is a hairy annual herb growing a branching stem to heights between 10 and 50 centimeters. The leaves are up to 4 centimeters long, variable in shape and covered in bristles.

The inflorescence contains clusters of tiny bristly white flowers only a few millimeters wide.
