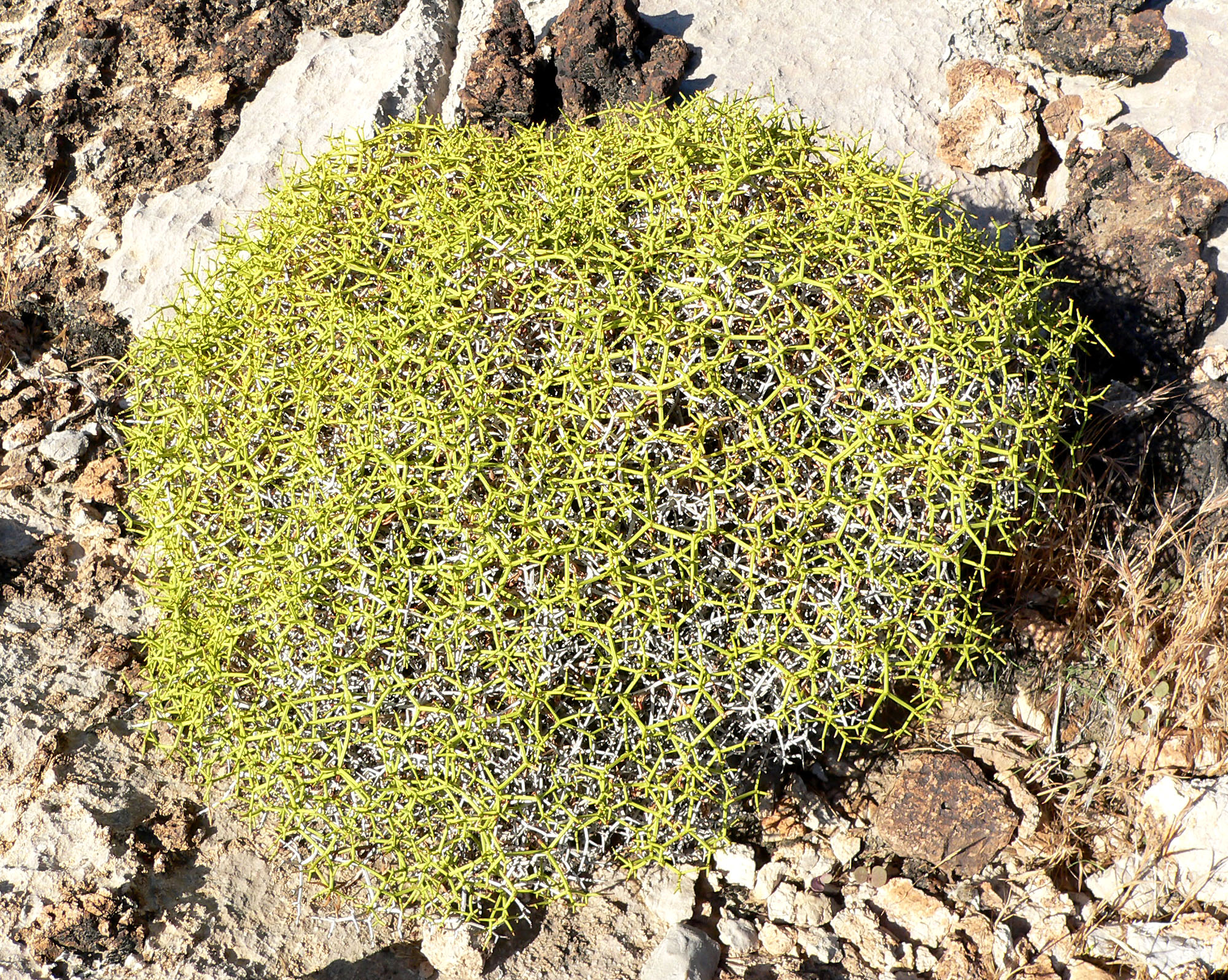
- var. sulcatum in southern Nevada

Scientific classification
- Kingdom: Plantae
- Clade: Tracheophytes
- Clade: Angiosperms
- Clade: Eudicots
- Order: Caryophyllales
- Family: Polygonaceae
- Genus: Eriogonum
- Species: E. heermannii

Binomial name
- Eriogonum heermannii Durand & Hilg.

Synonyms
- Eriogonum geniculatum

= Eriogonum heermannii =

Species of wild buckwheat

Eriogonum heermannii is a species of wild buckwheat known by the common name Heermann's buckwheat. It is native to the southwestern United States from California to Utah where it grows on rocky slopes, desert flats, and dry washes.

== Description ==
This shrub is quite variable in appearance, and there are a number of varieties. It may be a small, rounded patch ten centimeters wide or a sprawling bush up to two meters tall. It is an intricately branched, brambly plant having small woolly leaves scattered along its green to brown stems. The leaves do not persist long and leave behind a naked weedy form bearing very tiny flower clusters at nodes along the thin stems. Each cluster is less than three millimeters wide and holds white, yellow, or pink flowers.
