= Silene clokeyi =

Conservation status
- Critically Imperiled (NatureServe)

Scientific classification
- Kingdom: Plantae
- Clade: Tracheophytes
- Clade: Angiosperms
- Clade: Eudicots
- Order: Caryophyllales
- Family: Caryophyllaceae
- Genus: Silene
- Species: S. clokeyi

Binomial name
- Silene clokeyi C.L.Hitchc. & Maguire

Species of flowering plant

Silene clokeyi, known as Clokey's catchfly, is a species of flowering plant in the pink family. It is native to western North America.

== Distribution and habitat ==
Clokey's catchfly is a rare species, endemic to the Spring Mountains in Clark County, Nevada. It is threatened by foot traffic, invasive species, and horticultural exploitation.
