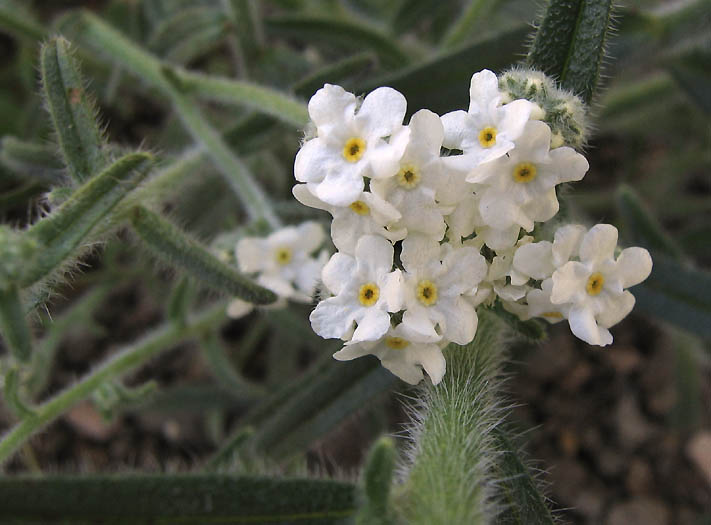

Scientific classification
- Kingdom: Plantae
- Clade: Tracheophytes
- Clade: Angiosperms
- Clade: Eudicots
- Clade: Asterids
- Order: Boraginales
- Family: Boraginaceae
- Genus: Cryptantha
- Species: C. muricata

Binomial name
- Cryptantha muricata (Hook. & Arn.) A.Nelson & J.F.Macbr.

= Cryptantha muricata =

Species of flowering plant

Cryptantha muricata is a species of flowering plant in the borage family known by the common name pointed cryptantha. It is native to California and adjacent parts of Arizona, Baja California, and Nevada, where it is known from many habitat types. It is an annual herb producing a branching stem between 10 centimeters and one meter in height, which is coated densely in rough and soft hairs. The leaves are linear in shape and no more than 4 centimeters long. They have hairs and bristles, some of which have bulbous bases. The inflorescence is a length of very hairy developing fruits tipped with a cluster of small five-lobed white flowers.
