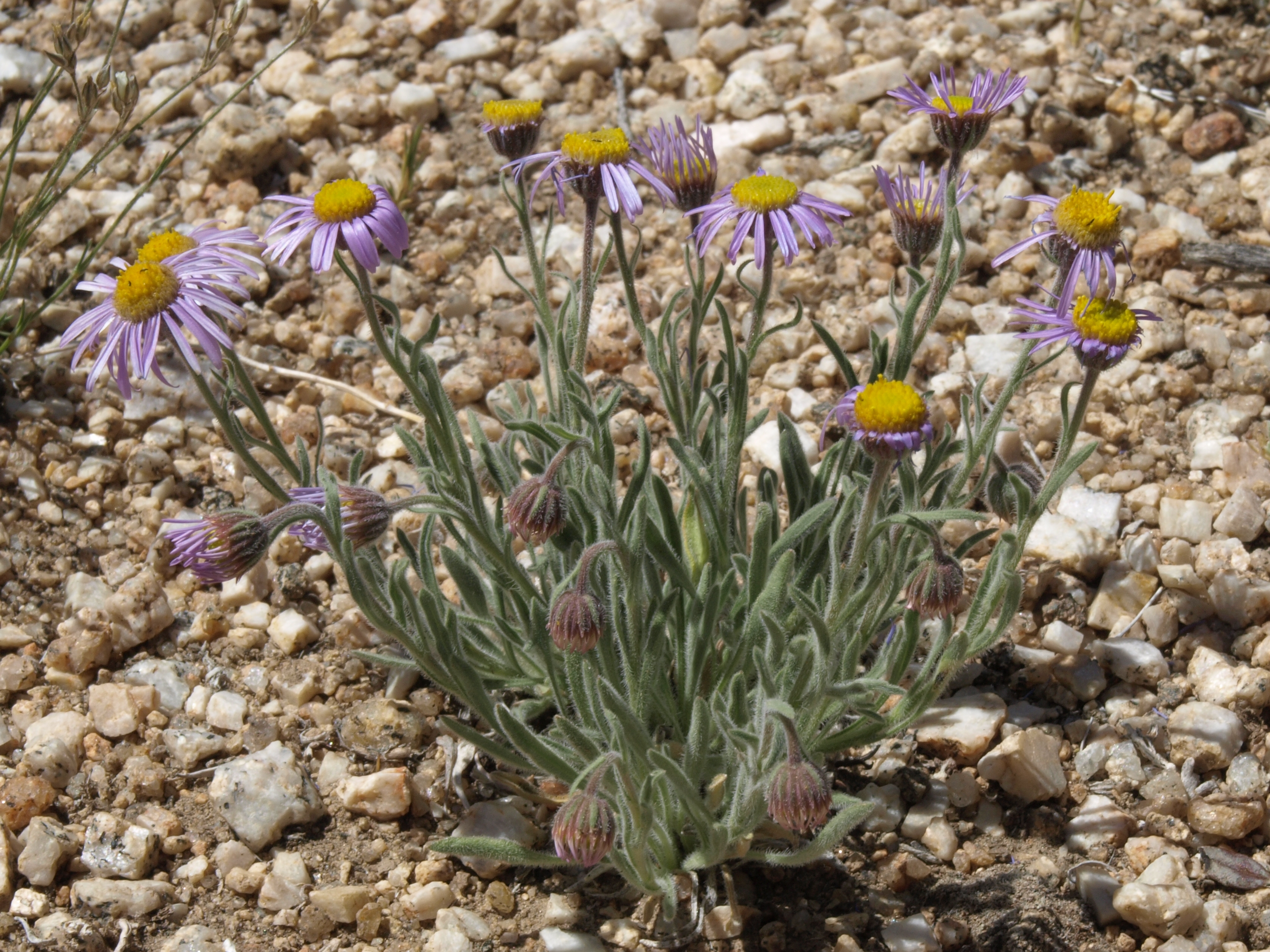
- Erigeron clokeyi var. pinzliae in eastern California

Scientific classification
- Kingdom: Plantae
- Clade: Tracheophytes
- Clade: Angiosperms
- Clade: Eudicots
- Clade: Asterids
- Order: Asterales
- Family: Asteraceae
- Genus: Erigeron
- Species: E. clokeyi

Binomial name
- Erigeron clokeyi Cronquist

= Erigeron clokeyi =

Species of flowering plant

Erigeron clokeyi is a North American species of flowering plant in the family Asteraceae known by the common name Clokey's fleabane, or Clokey's daisy.

Erigeron clokeyi is native to the sage scrub of Nevada and far eastern California, and it can also be found in the talus of the eastern flank of Sierra Nevada. There are a few additional populations reported from Beaver County in Utah.

Erigeron clokeyiis a small perennial herb with leaves mostly around the base of the plant. The hairy, unbranching erect stems each hold an inflorescence of a single flower head which is about a centimeter (0.4 inches) wide. The head has a center of golden yellow disc florets and a fringe of sometimes as many as 55 very light to medium purple (occasionally white or pink) ray florets which are usually reflexed (bent away from the center).

Varieties

- Erigeron clokeyi var. clokeyi - Charleston Mountains in Clark County in southern Nevada
- Erigeron clokeyi var. pinzliae G.L.Nesom - California, Nevada, Utah
