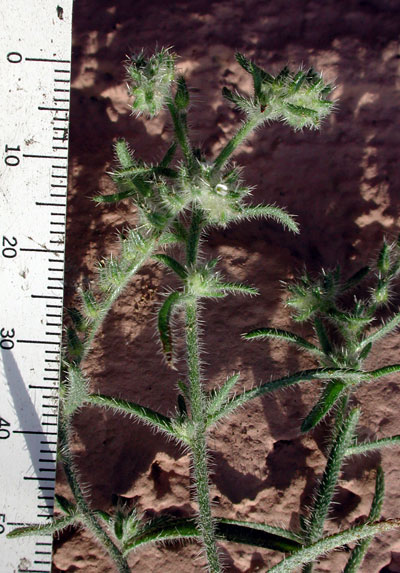

Conservation status
- Secure (NatureServe)

Scientific classification
- Kingdom: Plantae
- Clade: Tracheophytes
- Clade: Angiosperms
- Clade: Eudicots
- Clade: Asterids
- Order: Boraginales
- Family: Boraginaceae
- Genus: Johnstonella
- Species: J. angustifolia

Binomial name
- Johnstonella angustifolia (Torr.) Hasenstab & M.G.Simpson

Synonyms
- List: Cryptantha angustifolia (Torr.) Greene; Eremocarya angustifolia; Eritrichium angustifolium Torr.; Krynitzkia angustifolia A.Gray

= Johnstonella angustifolia =

Species of flowering plant

Johnstonella angustifolia is a species of wildflower in the borage family known by several common names, including Panamint catseye and bristlelobe cryptantha. This plant is native to northern Mexico and the southwestern United States from California to Texas, where it grows in desert scrub and woodland.

== Description ==
Johnstonella angustifolia is an annual herb usually under half a meter in height and covered in long hairs and bristles. It has a number of small linear leaves mostly toward the base of the plant. The erect stems are covered by inflorescences in a cane-shaped curl similar to the flowers of fiddlenecks. Each flower is white with yellow throat parts and a few millimeters wide.
