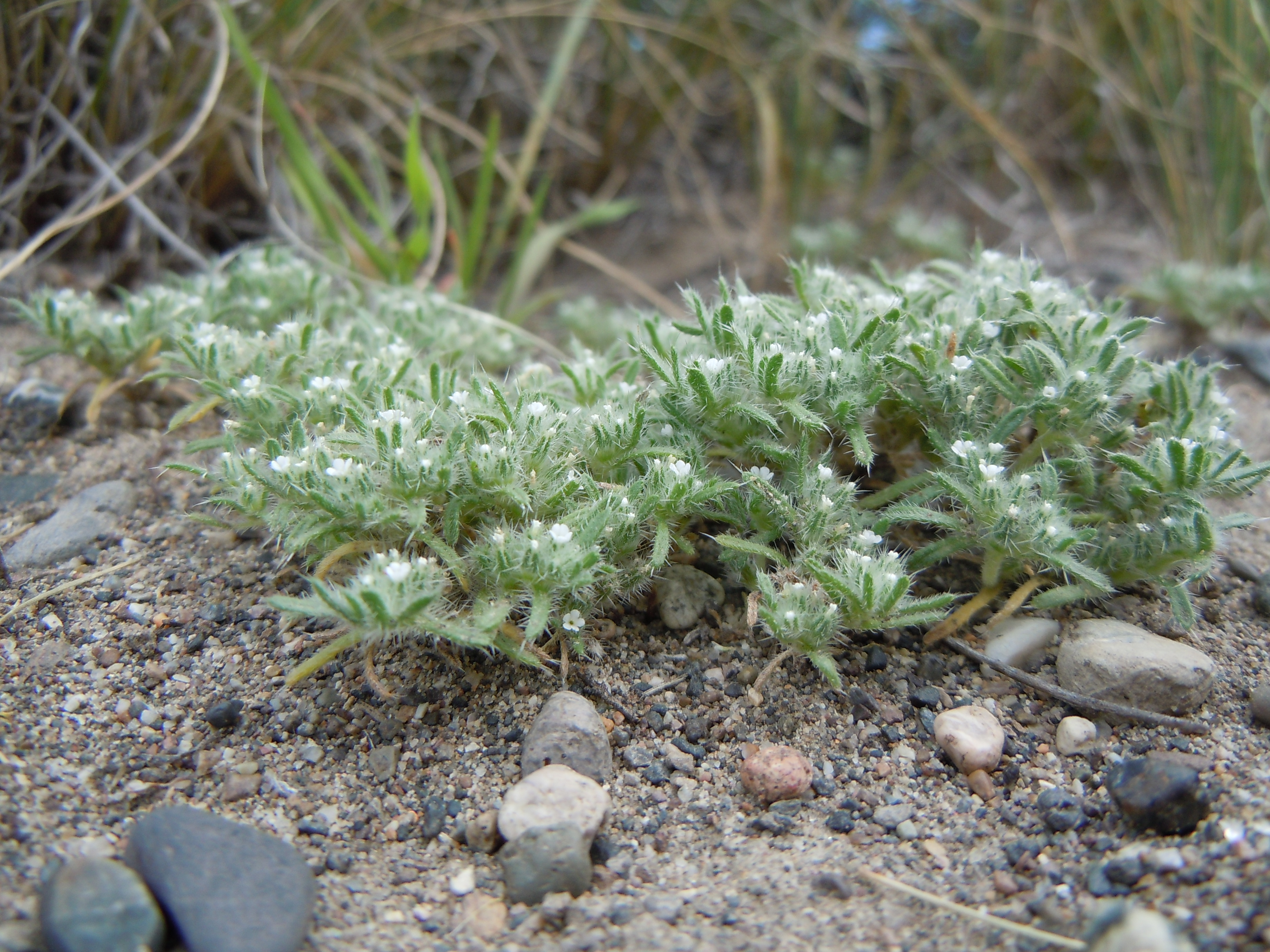

Conservation status
- Secure (NatureServe)

Scientific classification
- Kingdom: Plantae
- Clade: Tracheophytes
- Clade: Angiosperms
- Clade: Eudicots
- Clade: Asterids
- Order: Boraginales
- Family: Boraginaceae
- Genus: Greeneocharis
- Species: G. circumscissa

Binomial name
- Greeneocharis circumscissa (Hook. & Arn.) Rydb.

Synonyms
- Cryptantha circumscissa (Hook. & Arn.) I.M.Johnst.; Eritrichium circumscissum (Hook. & Arn.) A.Gray; Krynitzkia circumcissa (Hook. & Arn.) A.Gray; Lithospermum circumscissum Hook. & Arn.; Piptocalyx circumscissus (Hook. & Arn.) Torr.; Wheelerella circumcissa (Hook. & Arn.) G.B.Grant

= Greeneocharis circumscissa =

Species of flowering plant

Greeneocharis circumscissa is a species of flowering plant in the borage family, known by the common name cushion cryptantha. It is native to western North America from Washington to Baja California to Colorado and it is also found in Argentina. It grows in sandy or gravelly types of habitat, from mountains to desert, below 9,500 m (31,200 ft) above sea level.

This is an annual herb producing a short, bristly, multi-branched stem tangled into a mat no more than 10 centimeters tall. It grows from a red taproot which dries purple. The leaves are up to 1.5 centimeters long, linear to widely lance-shaped, and densely hairy to bristly. The inflorescence is a length of developing fruits with a dense cluster of up to 5 flowers at the tip. The flower has a five-lobed white corolla with yellow appendages at the top of its tube. It flowers between April and August.

It was first published in Bull. Torrey Bot. Club vol.36 on page 677 in 1909.

The Latin specific epithet circumscissa is derived from the Latin for "cut around" because the upper half of the fruiting calyx falls away when the nutlets are ripe.

It has 3 known variants;

- Greeneocharis circumscissa var. circumscissa
- Greeneocharis circumscissa var. hispida J.F.Macbr.
- Greeneocharis circumscissa var. rosulata (J.T.Howell) Hasenstab & M.G.Simpson
