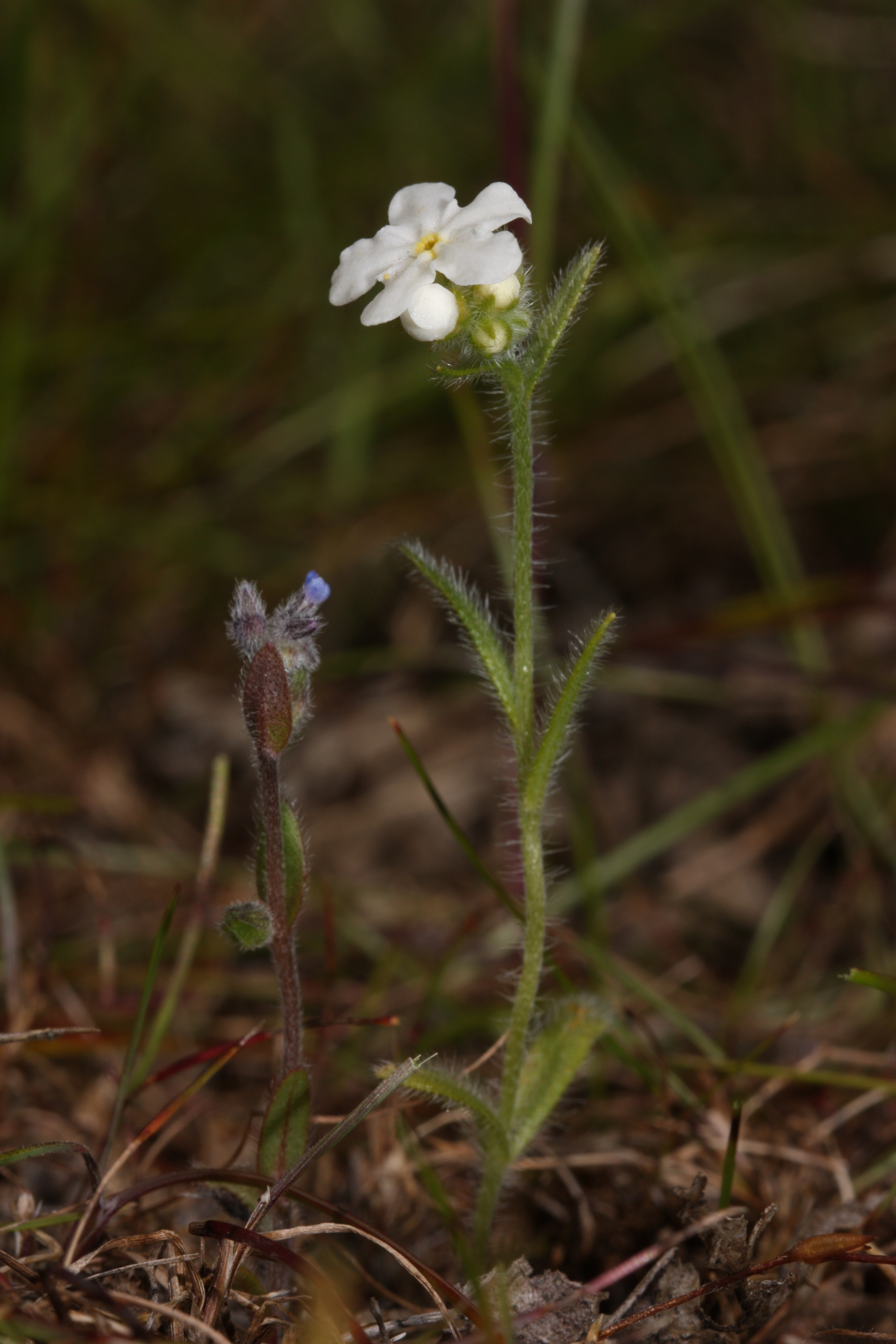

Scientific classification
- Kingdom: Plantae
- Clade: Tracheophytes
- Clade: Angiosperms
- Clade: Eudicots
- Clade: Asterids
- Order: Boraginales
- Family: Boraginaceae
- Genus: Cryptantha
- Species: C. intermedia

Binomial name
- Cryptantha intermedia (Gray) Greene

Synonyms
- Cryptantha fragilis Cryptantha grandiflora Cryptantha hendersonii

= Cryptantha intermedia =

Species of flowering plant

Cryptantha intermedia is a species of wildflower in the borage family known by several common names, including common cryptantha, Clearwater cryptantha, and nievitas.

This plant is native to the woodlands and forests of western North America from British Columbia to Baja California. It is often a member of the chaparral plant community.

== Description ==
Cryptantha intermedia is an annual plant with a rough, hairy, branching stem reaching a maximum of half a meter in height. It grows from a mostly basal clump of hairy leaves one to several centimeters long.

The erect stems are topped with one or more small flowers, each about a centimeter wide and bright white, sometimes with yellow coloration in the throat.
