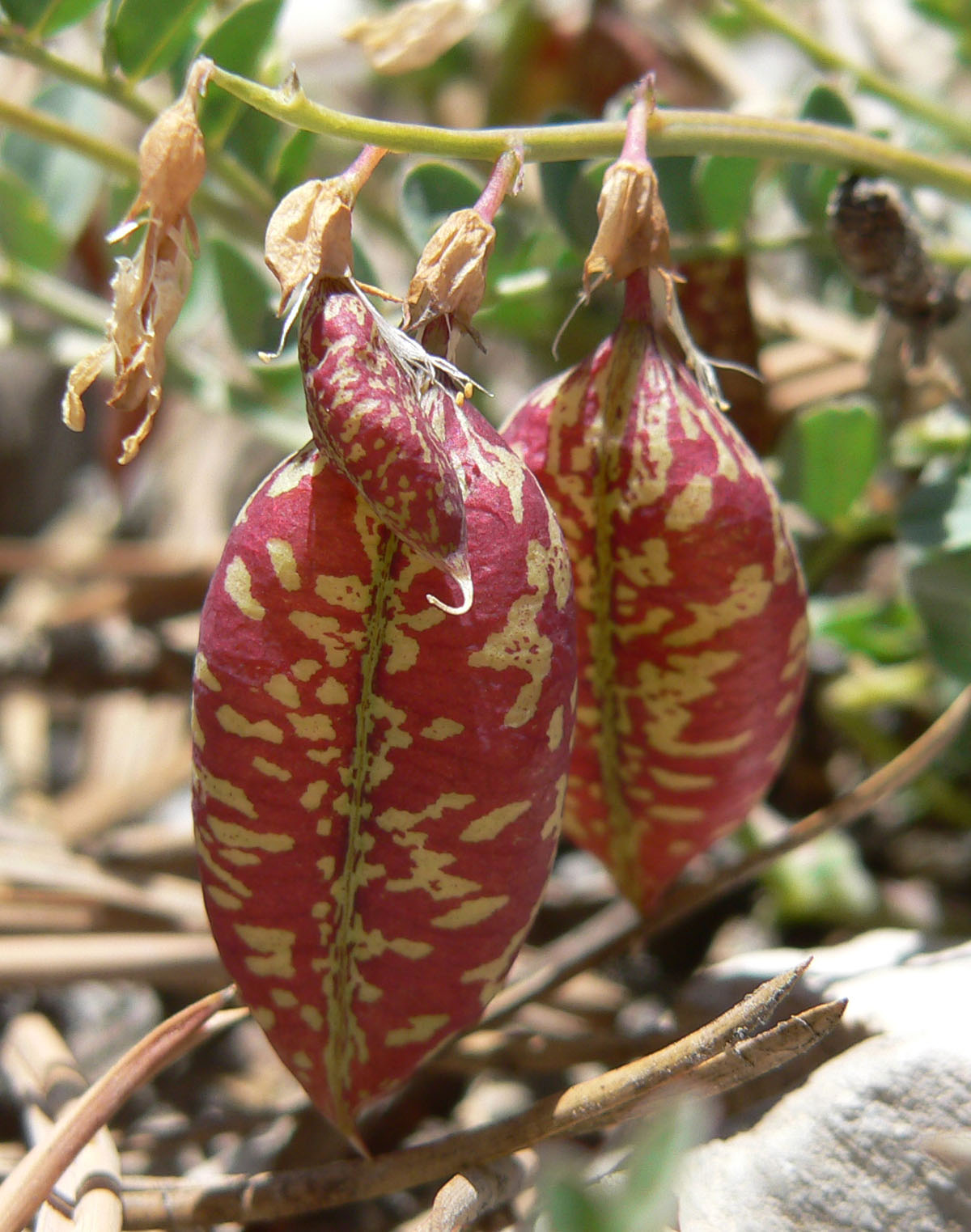
- pods of var. clokeyanus

Conservation status
- Apparently Secure (NatureServe)

Scientific classification
- Kingdom: Plantae
- Clade: Tracheophytes
- Clade: Angiosperms
- Clade: Eudicots
- Clade: Rosids
- Order: Fabales
- Family: Fabaceae
- Subfamily: Faboideae
- Genus: Astragalus
- Species: A. oophorus

Binomial name
- Astragalus oophorus S.Wats.

= Astragalus oophorus =

Species of legume

Astragalus oophorus is a species of milkvetch known by the common name egg milkvetch. It is native to the western United States, mainly California and Nevada, though one variety can be found as far east as Colorado. It is a plant of sagebrush and other dry habitat.

== Description ==
Astragalus oophorus is a perennial herb with a stout, mostly hairless stem reaching up to about 30 cm (12 in) in length. Leaves are up to 15 cm (5.9 in) long and are made up of many oval to rounded leaflets. The inflorescence is an array of four to ten flowers each up to 2.5 cm (0.98 in) long. The flowers are cream-colored or reddish purple with white tips. The fruit is an inflated legume pod, oval in shape and bladder-like, 2 cm (0.79 in) to over 5 cm (2.0 in) long.

=== Varieties ===
There are several varieties of Astragalus oophorus, including:

- A. o. var. caulescens - native to the western US from Nevada to Colorado
- A. o. var. clokeyanus - endemic to Nevada
- A. o. var. lavinii (Lavin's milkvetch) - native to Nevada and known from California
