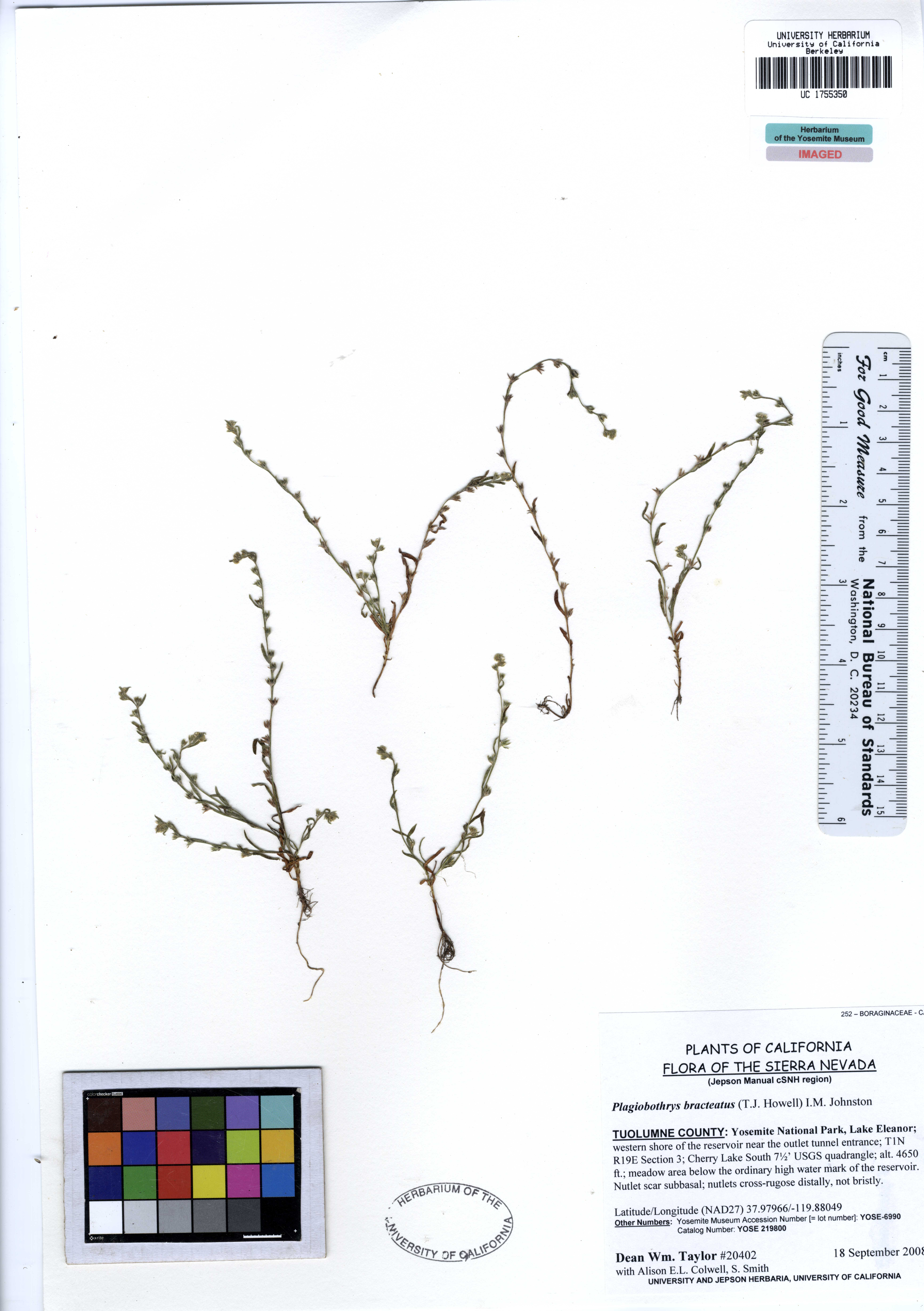
- Plagiobothrys bracteatus

Scientific classification
- Kingdom: Plantae
- Clade: Tracheophytes
- Clade: Angiosperms
- Clade: Eudicots
- Clade: Asterids
- Order: Boraginales
- Family: Boraginaceae
- Genus: Plagiobothrys
- Species: P. bracteatus

Binomial name
- Plagiobothrys bracteatus (Howell) I.M.Johnst.

= Plagiobothrys bracteatus =

Species of flowering plant

Plagiobothrys bracteatus is a species of flowering plant in the borage family known by the common name bracted popcornflower.

== Distribution ==
It is native from Oregon throughout California into Baja California (Mexico).

It can be found in a variety of wet habitats such as vernal pools and other moist spots in chaparral, forests and woodlands.

== Description ==
Plagiobothrys bracteatus is an annual herb with a mostly upright stem 10 to 40 centimeters in length. The leaves are located along the stem, the lowest, largest ones measuring up to 10 centimeters long. The plant is coated in sparse rough hairs.

The inflorescence is a series of tiny flowers, the lower ones accompanied by leaflike bracts. Each five-lobed white corolla measures 1 to 3 millimeters wide.

The fruit is a narrow, cross-ribbed, tubercled nutlet no more than 2 millimeters long.
