= Plagiobothrys austiniae =

Scientific classification
- Kingdom: Plantae
- Clade: Tracheophytes
- Clade: Angiosperms
- Clade: Eudicots
- Clade: Asterids
- Order: Boraginales
- Family: Boraginaceae
- Genus: Plagiobothrys
- Species: P. austiniae

Binomial name
- Plagiobothrys austiniae (Greene) I.M.Johnst.

Species of flowering plant

Plagiobothrys austiniae is a species of flowering plant in the borage family known by the common name Austin's popcornflower. It is native to California, where it can be found in the Central Valley and Sierra Nevada foothills. It is also known from southern Oregon.

Its habitat includes moist and wet areas, such as vernal pools. It is an annual herb with a spreading or erect stem 10 to 40 centimeters in length. The leaves are located along the stem, the lowest, largest ones measuring up to 5 centimeters long. The plant is coated in rough hairs. The inflorescence is a series of tiny flowers, each five-lobed white corolla less than 3 millimeters wide. The fruit is a bristly nutlet with prickles along its midribs.
