= Plagiobothrys mollis =

Scientific classification
- Kingdom: Plantae
- Clade: Tracheophytes
- Clade: Angiosperms
- Clade: Eudicots
- Clade: Asterids
- Order: Boraginales
- Family: Boraginaceae
- Genus: Plagiobothrys
- Species: P. mollis

Binomial name
- Plagiobothrys mollis (A.Gray) I.M.Johnst.

Species of flowering plant

Plagiobothrys mollis is a species of flowering plant in the borage family known by the common name soft popcornflower. It is native to Oregon, Nevada, and the Sierra Nevada of California, where it grows in scrub and grassy habitat, especially in moist and wet areas.

== Description ==
It is a perennial herb producing small, decumbent stems running along the ground and rooting at nodes. It is very hairy in texture, the hair is soft and long. The leaves on the stem may be arranged alternately or oppositely. The inflorescence is a series of tiny white flowers up to 1 centimeter wide.

== Varieties ==
There are two varieties of this plant. Most incidences are var. mollis.
The other variety, var. vestitus, is known only from the type specimen collected in the 19th century near Petaluma, California. It has not been seen since, and is presumed to be extinct.
