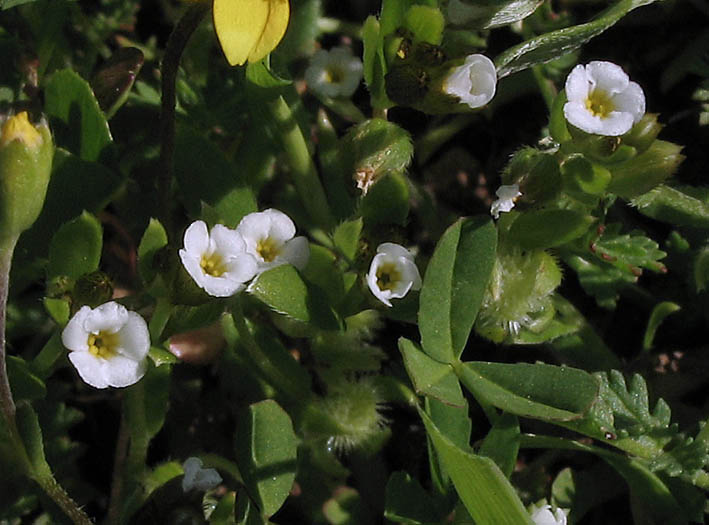

Scientific classification
- Kingdom: Plantae
- Clade: Tracheophytes
- Clade: Angiosperms
- Clade: Eudicots
- Clade: Asterids
- Order: Boraginales
- Family: Boraginaceae
- Genus: Plagiobothrys
- Species: P. acanthocarpus

Binomial name
- Plagiobothrys acanthocarpus (Piper) I.M.Johnst.

= Plagiobothrys acanthocarpus =

Species of flowering plant

Plagiobothrys acanthocarpus is a species of flowering plant in the borage family known by the common name adobe popcornflower. It is native to California and northwestern sections of Mexico, where it can be found in moist areas on clay soil, such as vernal pools. It is an annual herb with a spreading or erect stem 10 to 40 centimeters in length. The leaves are linear or lance-shaped to oblong and several centimeters in length. The plant is coated in rough hairs. The inflorescence is a series of tiny flowers, each with a yellow-throated, five-lobed white corolla less than 3 millimeters wide. The nutlets are covered in long prickles with some bristles between.
