= Plagiobothrys distantiflorus =

Scientific classification
- Kingdom: Plantae
- Clade: Tracheophytes
- Clade: Angiosperms
- Clade: Eudicots
- Clade: Asterids
- Order: Boraginales
- Family: Boraginaceae
- Genus: Plagiobothrys
- Species: P. distantiflorus

Binomial name
- Plagiobothrys distantiflorus (Piper) I.M.Johnst. ex M.Peck

Species of flowering plant

Plagiobothrys distantiflorus is a species of flowering plant in the borage family known by the common name California popcornflower. It is endemic to California, where it is known only from the northern and central Sierra Nevada foothills.

It grows in grassland and woodland habitat. It is an annual herb with a spreading or erect stem up to 30 centimeters in length. The leaves along the stem are up to 2.5 centimeters long and coated in rough hairs. The inflorescence is a series of tiny flowers accompanied by hairy bracts. The flowers have five-lobed white corollas under 2 millimeters wide.
