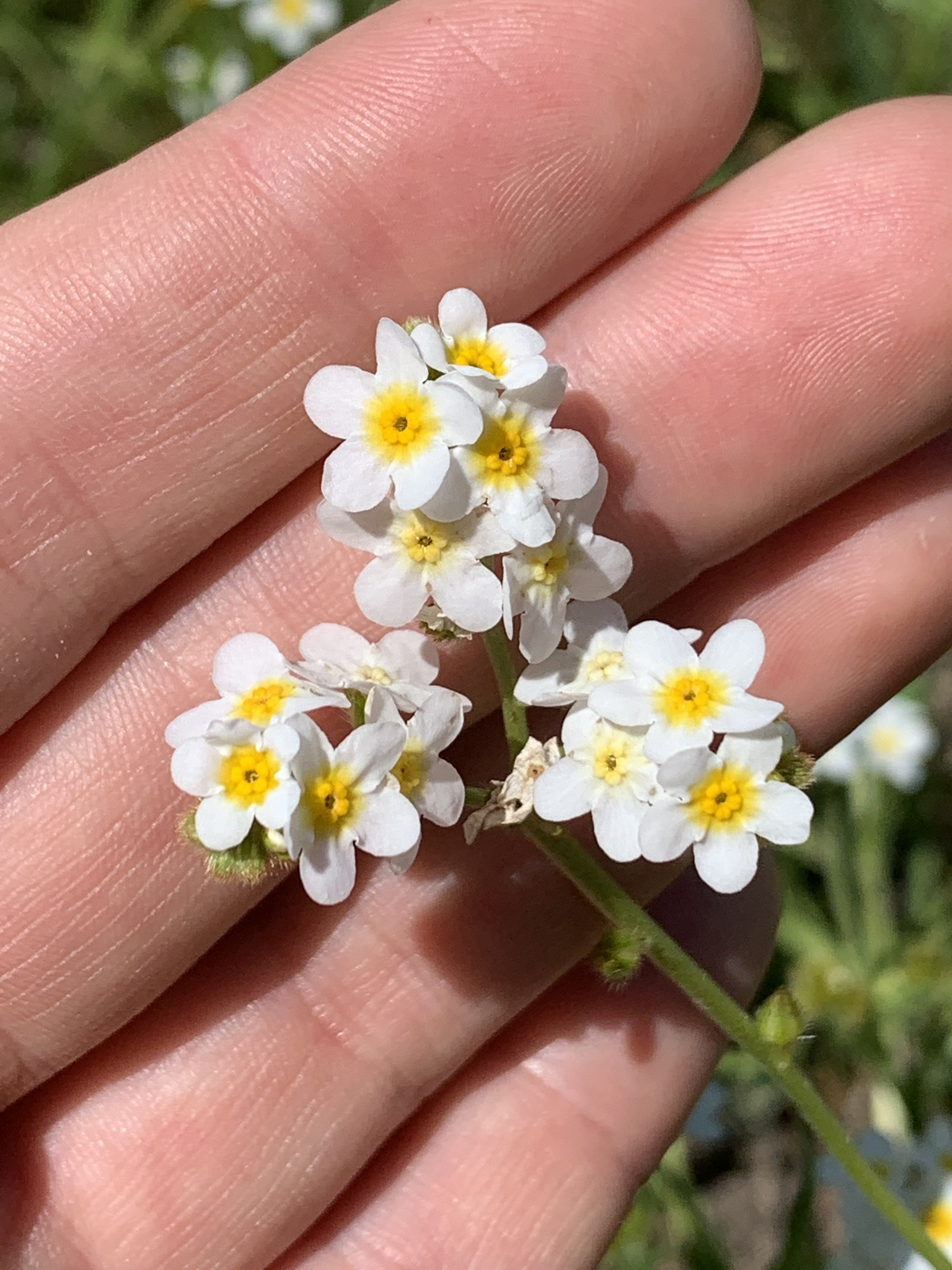

Conservation status
- Apparently Secure (NatureServe)

Scientific classification
- Kingdom: Plantae
- Clade: Tracheophytes
- Clade: Angiosperms
- Clade: Eudicots
- Clade: Asterids
- Order: Boraginales
- Family: Boraginaceae
- Genus: Plagiobothrys
- Species: P. figuratus

Binomial name
- Plagiobothrys figuratus (Piper) I.M.Johnst. ex M.Peck

= Plagiobothrys figuratus =

Species of flowering plant

Plagiobothrys figuratus is a species of flowering plant in the borage family known by the common name fragrant popcornflower. It is native to western North America from southern British Columbia to south-western Oregon, and it can also be found in areas east such as Michigan and Illinois.

One rare subspecies, ssp. corallicarpus, is endemic to Oregon.
