= Plagiobothrys parishii =

Conservation status
- Critically Imperiled (NatureServe)

Scientific classification
- Kingdom: Plantae
- Clade: Tracheophytes
- Clade: Angiosperms
- Clade: Eudicots
- Clade: Asterids
- Order: Boraginales
- Family: Boraginaceae
- Genus: Plagiobothrys
- Species: P. parishii

Binomial name
- Plagiobothrys parishii I.M.Johnst.

Species of flowering plant

Plagiobothrys parishii, known by the common name Parish's popcornflower, is an uncommon species of flowering plant in the borage family.

== Distribution ==
The plant is endemic to southeastern California. It is known only from 12 to 14 occurrences in the Owens Valley within Inyo County and Mono County, and 2 occurrences in the Lucerne Valley area of the Mojave Desert within San Bernardino County.

It can be found on mud flats and around desert springs, between 750–2,210 metres (2,460–7,250 ft) in elevation. It is found in wetland-riparian areas of Joshua tree woodland and Great Basin sagebrush scrub habitats.

== Description ==
Plagiobothrys parishii is an annual herb growing prostrate along the ground, the stems reaching up to about 30 centimeters long. It is coated in short hairs.

The inflorescence is a series of tiny five-lobed flowers each about 4 millimeters wide. The flower is white, usually with yellow appendages at the center. The bloom period is March to June.

It is a listed Critically endangered species on the California Native Plant Society Inventory of Rare and Endangered Plants. It is threatened by groundwater pumping.
