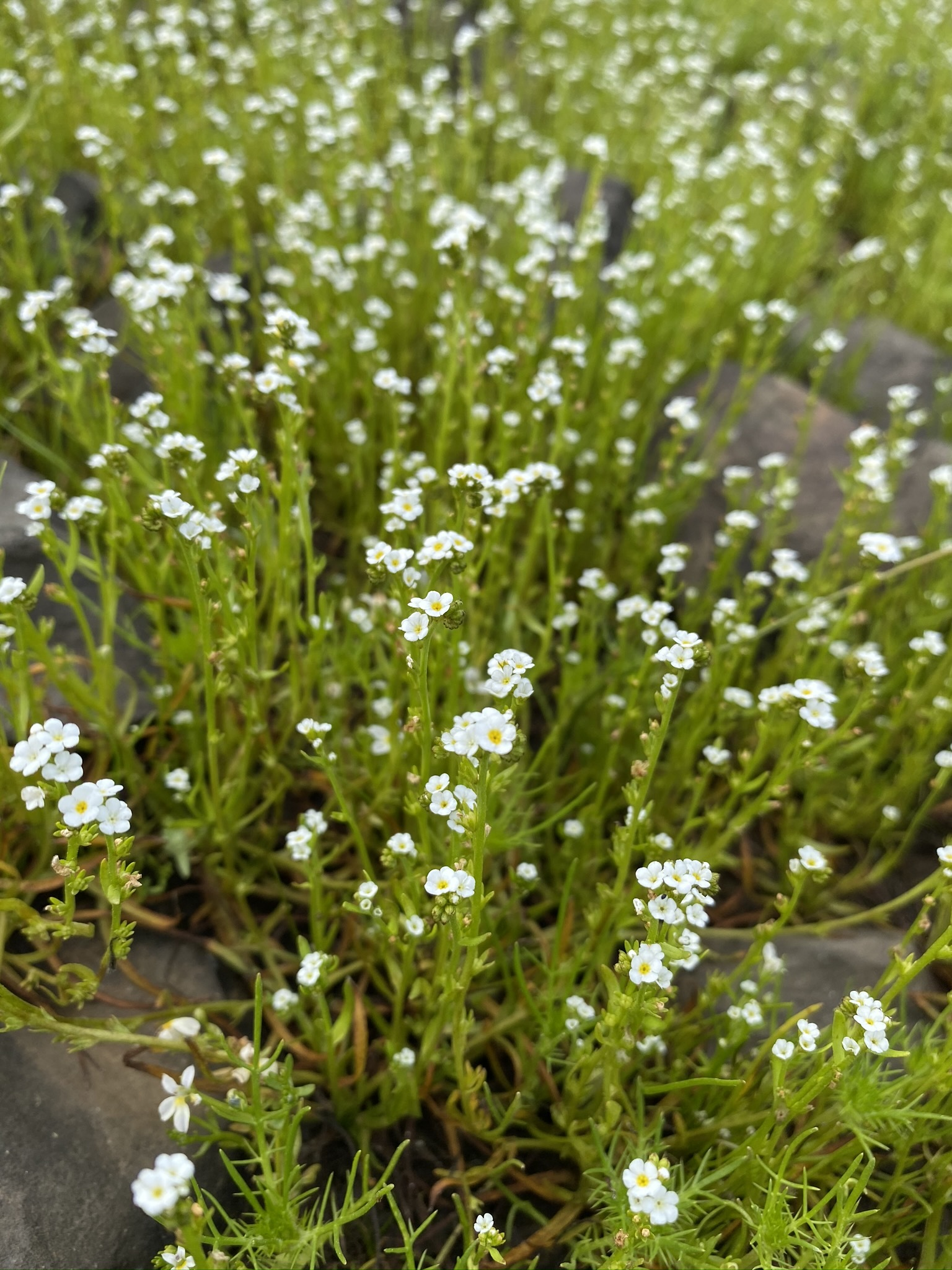

Scientific classification
- Kingdom: Plantae
- Clade: Tracheophytes
- Clade: Angiosperms
- Clade: Eudicots
- Clade: Asterids
- Order: Boraginales
- Family: Boraginaceae
- Genus: Plagiobothrys
- Species: P. stipitatus

Binomial name
- Plagiobothrys stipitatus (Greene) I.M.Johnst.

= Plagiobothrys stipitatus =

Species of flowering plant

Plagiobothrys stipitatus is a species of flowering plant in the borage family known by the common name stalked popcornflower and stipitate forget-me-not. It is native to Oregon and most of California, where it grows in vernal pools and similar wet habitat types. It is an annual herb producing a narrow, hollow, erect stem up to half a meter tall. It is coated in rough hairs. The pointed, hairy leaves along the stem are up to 11 centimeters long. The inflorescence is a series of five-lobed white flowers 2 millimeters to over one centimeter wide. The fruit is a narrow, ribbed nutlet.
