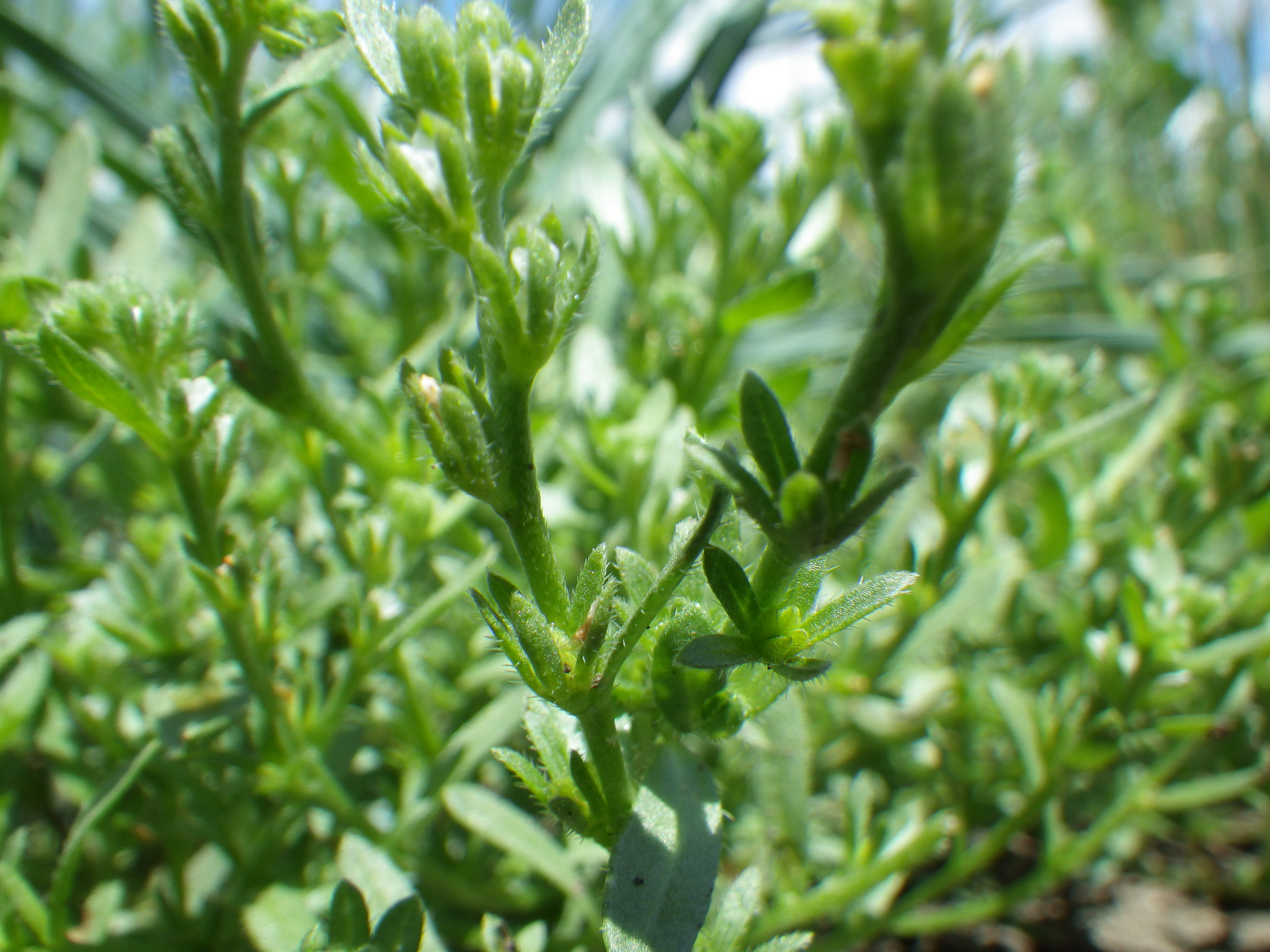

Conservation status
- Apparently Secure (NatureServe)

Scientific classification
- Kingdom: Plantae
- Clade: Embryophytes
- Clade: Tracheophytes
- Clade: Spermatophytes
- Clade: Angiosperms
- Clade: Eudicots
- Clade: Asterids
- Order: Boraginales
- Family: Boraginaceae
- Genus: Plagiobothrys
- Species: P. leptocladus

Binomial name
- Plagiobothrys leptocladus (Greene) I.M.Johnst.

= Plagiobothrys leptocladus =

Species of flowering plant

Plagiobothrys leptocladus is a species of flowering plant in the borage family known by the common names finebranched popcornflower and alkali plagiobothrys. It is native to western North America from Alaska to the Dakotas and northern Mexico, where it can be found in varied types of wet habitat, including inundated alkali flats and vernal pools.

It is an annual herb growing mostly decumbent with stems 10 to 30 centimeters long. It is hairless to roughly hairy in texture. The leaves along the stem reach 10 centimeters in length near the base. The inflorescence is a series of tiny white flowers each 1 or 2 millimeters wide. Each is surrounded by a calyx of bent, ribbed sepals. The fruit is a lance-shaped nutlet.
