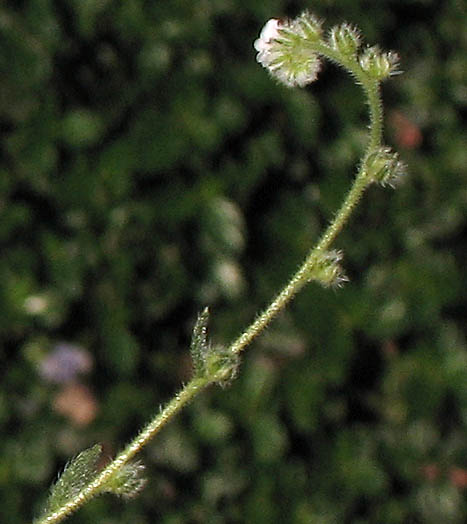

Scientific classification
- Kingdom: Plantae
- Clade: Tracheophytes
- Clade: Angiosperms
- Clade: Eudicots
- Clade: Asterids
- Order: Boraginales
- Family: Boraginaceae
- Genus: Plagiobothrys
- Species: P. collinus

Binomial name
- Plagiobothrys collinus (Phil.) I.M.Johnst.

= Plagiobothrys collinus =

Species of flowering plant

Plagiobothrys collinus is a species of flowering plant in the borage family known by the common name Cooper's popcornflower.

== Distribution ==
The annual plant is native to California, Arizona, and northern Baja California (Mexico).

It can be found in many types of habitats, including coastal sage scrub, chaparral, valley grassland, and open areas of oak woodland.

== Description ==
Plagiobothrys collinus is an annual herb with a spreading or erect stem 10–40 centimetres (3.9–15.7 in) in length. The leaves along the stem are 1 to 4 centimeters long, the lower ones oppositely arranged and the upper ones alternate. The herbage is coated in fine and rough hairs.

The inflorescence is a long, widely spaced series of tiny flowers, each with a five-lobed white corolla no more than 7 millimeters wide, sometimes as small as one millimeter. The bloom period is February through May.

The fruit is a minute nutlet with angular cross-ribs visible in magnification.

=== Varieties ===
Varieties include:

- Plagiobothrys collinus var. californicus — California popcorn flower, primarily Peninsular Ranges in California and Baja California (México).
- Plagiobothrys collinus var. fulvescens — California popcornflower, rusty haired popcorn flower, native to California chaparral and woodlands habitats in California and Baja California.
- Plagiobothrys collinus var. gracilis — Graceful popcorn flower, endemic to coastal sage scrub in Southern California, including the Channel Islands.
- Plagiobothrys collinus var. ursinus — Northern popcorn flower, native to eastern Transverse Ranges and Peninsular Ranges in southern California and northwestern Baja California.
