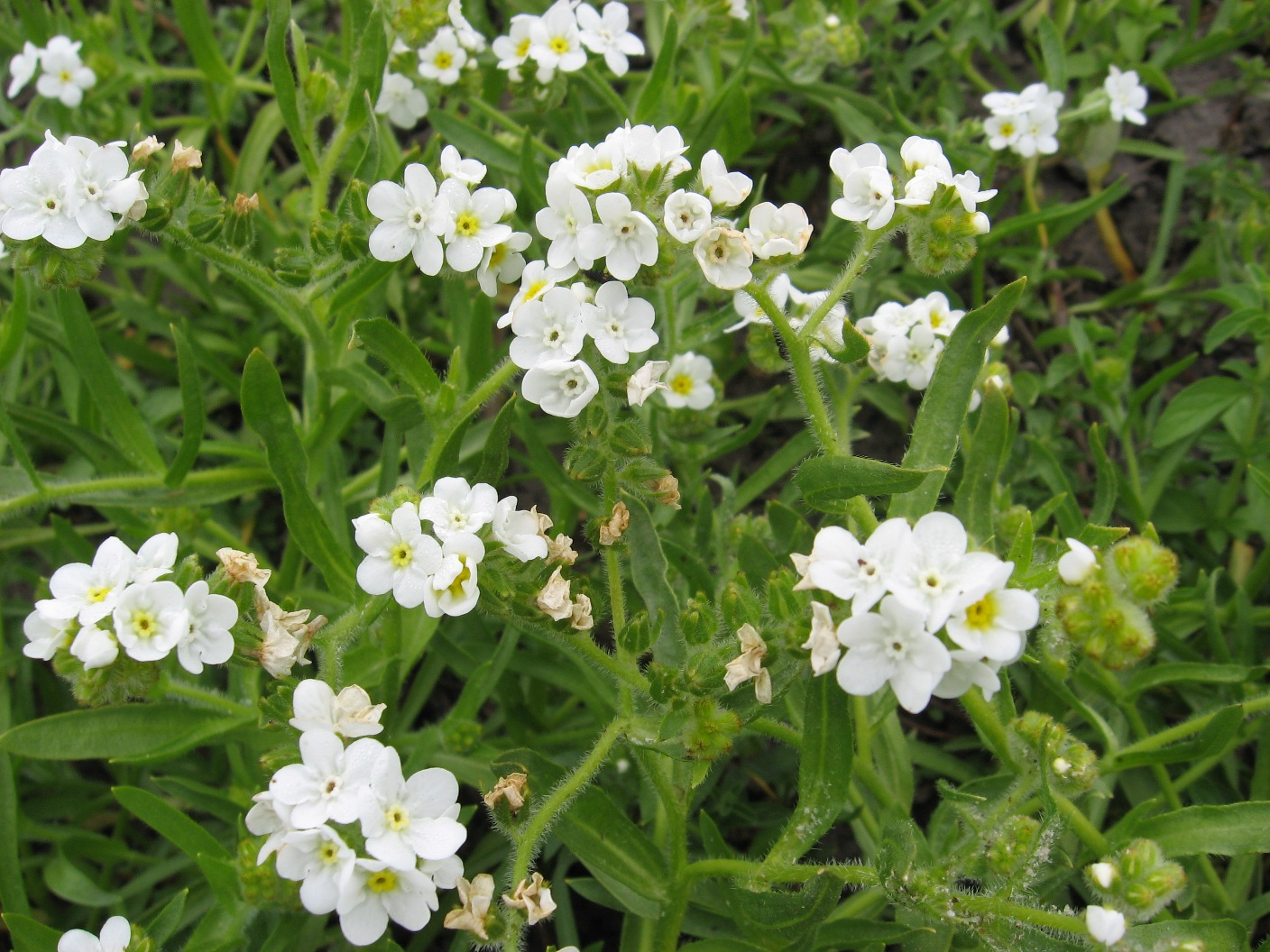

Conservation status
- Critically Imperiled (NatureServe)

Scientific classification
- Kingdom: Plantae
- Clade: Tracheophytes
- Clade: Angiosperms
- Clade: Eudicots
- Clade: Asterids
- Order: Boraginales
- Family: Boraginaceae
- Genus: Plagiobothrys
- Species: P. hirtus

Binomial name
- Plagiobothrys hirtus (Greene) I.M.Johnst.

= Plagiobothrys hirtus =

Species of flowering plant

Plagiobothrys hirtus, the rough popcornflower, is a plant species with only about a dozen reportedly extant occurrences, all within the Umpqua River watershed in Douglas County, Oregon. It is federally listed endangered in the United States of America. In fact P. hirtus is now considered to be one of the top three most endangered vascular plant species in the Northwest. The state of Oregon has ranked this plant as its number one recovery priority due to its high degree of threat as well as its high rating in recovery potential. Its recovery depends on conservation of existing populations as well as reintroduction of new populations in protected and species-appropriate areas.

The habitats most suitable for P. hirtus are seasonal wetlands, which are inundated with water from late fall until spring, but may dry out in summer. However, development, agriculture, and fire suppression have all played a role in the alteration and elimination of much of this species’ habitat. After overwintering submerged in water, this facultatively perennial herb bears a basal rosette of leaves which gives rise to a hairy flowering stalk that can be up to 70 cm tall. These stalks bear spirals of white and yellow inflorescences of five-petaled flowers. The flowers are self-compatible, but need insects to achieve pollination and significant seed set, and can produce up to four tan- to black-colored, one-seeded nutlets. Recruitment is highly viable in the greenhouse, with a 65 to 95 percent germination rate, and cultivated plants transplant well into the field. These two – high viability and prolific growth after transplanting—are what make the reintroduction of the species so promising.

Reintroduced populations of P. hirtus established by the Oregon Department of Agriculture have been thriving for sixteen years. To date, reintroductions projects have been successful in augmenting existing and creating new populations of the species, with plants persisting since the initial 1998 reintroductions. During this time, information has also been gathered concerning the life history and establishment ecology of the species. Under careful monitoring and management, this species now has an excellent chance to be self-sustaining in the future, assuming additional populations can be established on administratively protected lands.
