= Ivania =

Ivania may refer to:

- Ivania (beetle), a genus of beetles in the family Melandryidae
- Ivania (plant), a genus of plants in the family Brassicaceae
- Ivania (opera), by Emilio Pizzi, 1926
