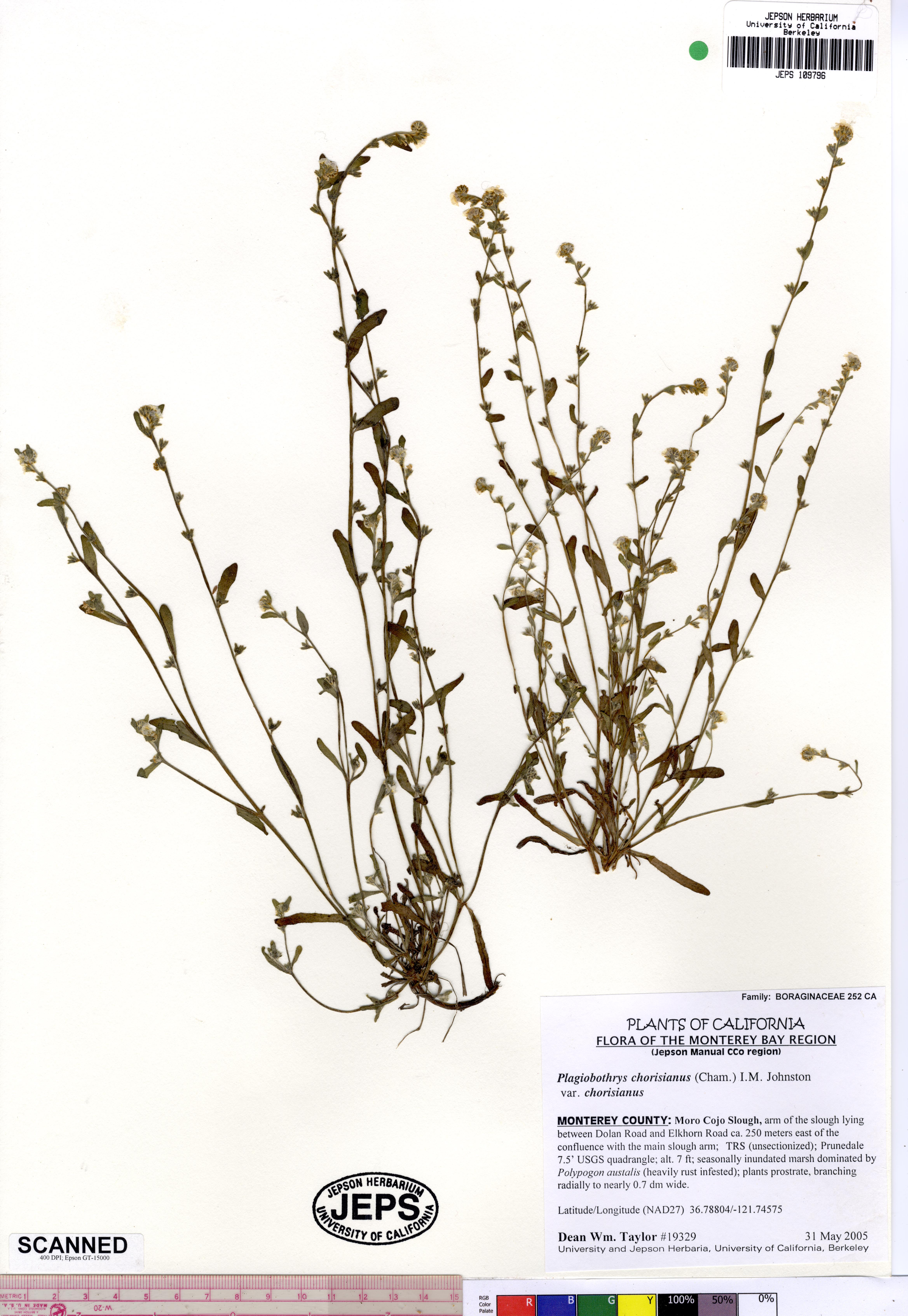
- Plagiobothrys chorisianus

Scientific classification
- Kingdom: Plantae
- Clade: Tracheophytes
- Clade: Angiosperms
- Clade: Eudicots
- Clade: Asterids
- Order: Boraginales
- Family: Boraginaceae
- Genus: Plagiobothrys
- Species: P. chorisianus

Binomial name
- Plagiobothrys chorisianus (Cham.) I.M.Johnst.

= Plagiobothrys chorisianus =

Species of flowering plant

Plagiobothrys chorisianus is a species of flowering plant in the borage family known by the common name artist's popcornflower. It is endemic to California, where it can be found in and around the San Francisco Bay Area and parts of the coastline to the south.

It is a resident of chaparral, coastal scrub and grassland habitat. It is an annual herb with a spreading or erect stem 10 to 40 centimeters (4 to 16 inches) in length. The leaves along the stem are 3 to 7 centimeters (1 1/4 to 2 3/4 inches) long and coated in rough hairs. The inflorescence is a series of tiny flowers, each on a pedicel up to one centimeter (1/2 inch) in length. The five-lobed white flower is one and a half centimeters (2/3 inch) wide with a center of white to bright yellow appendages.

This species is sometimes divided into varieties.
