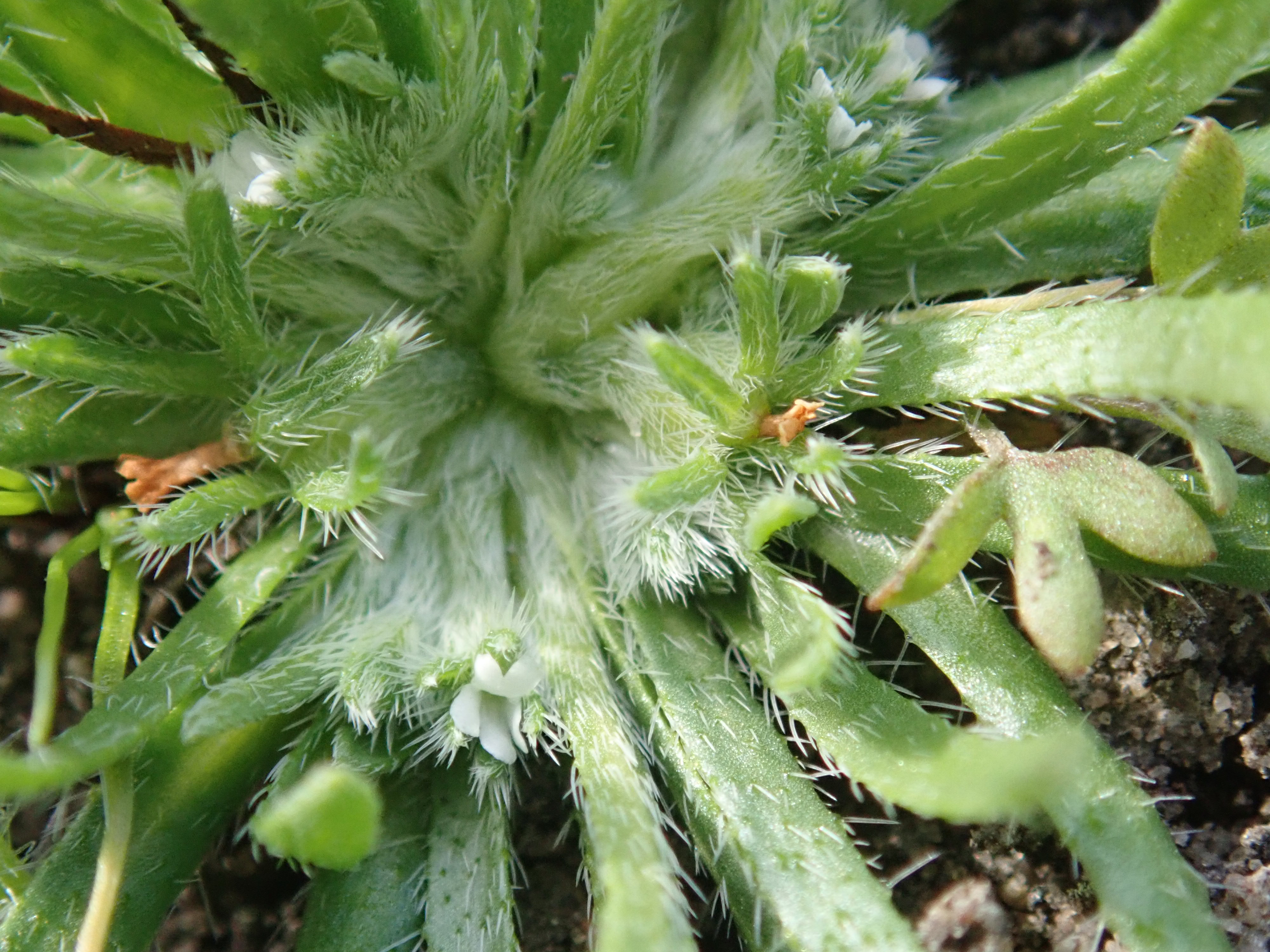
- Flower
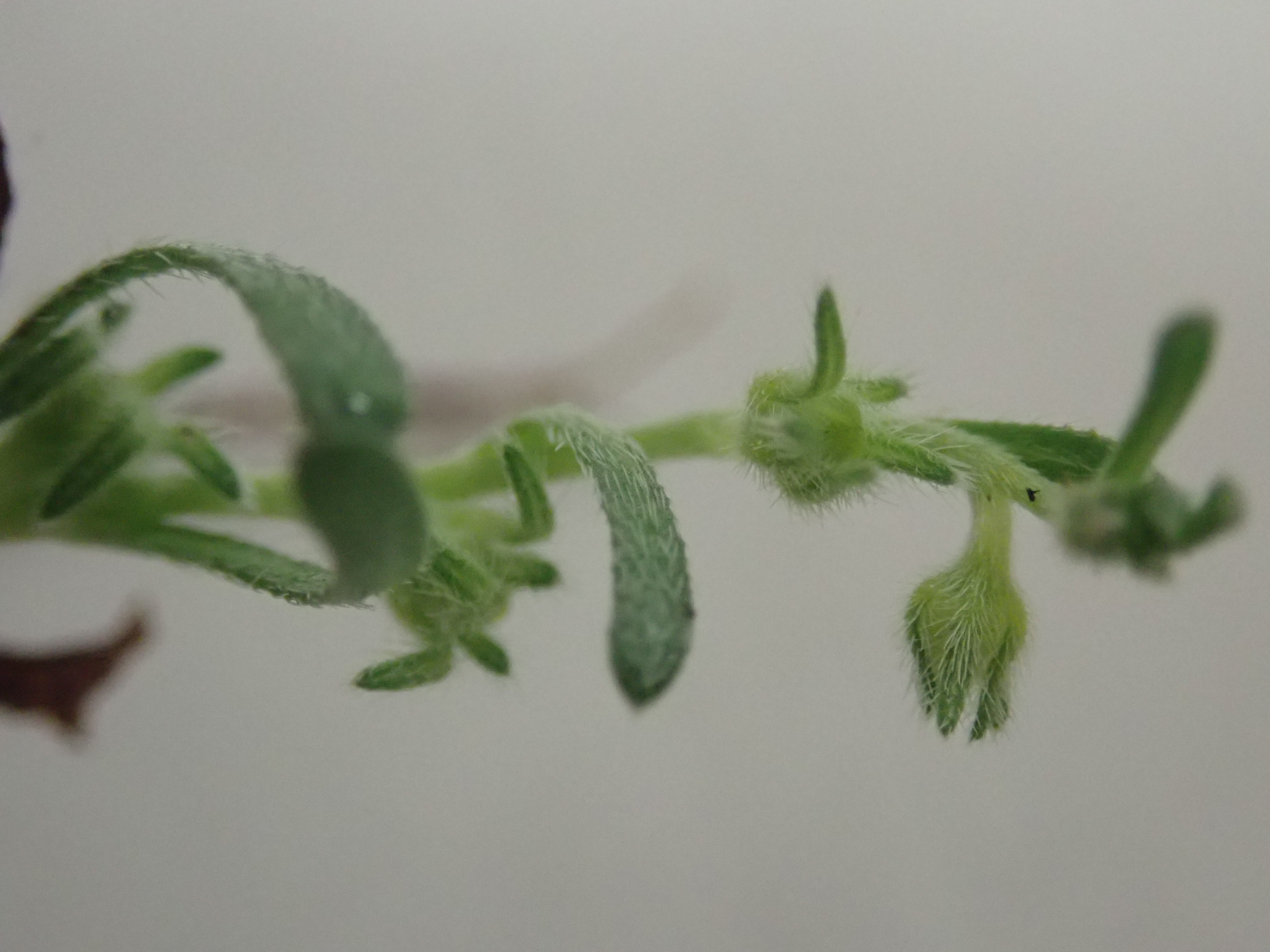
- Fruit

Scientific classification
- Kingdom: Plantae
- Clade: Tracheophytes
- Clade: Angiosperms
- Clade: Eudicots
- Clade: Asterids
- Order: Boraginales
- Family: Boraginaceae
- Genus: Plagiobothrys
- Species: P. plurisepaleus

Binomial name
- Plagiobothrys plurisepaleus (F.Muell.) I.M.Johnst.

= Plagiobothrys plurisepaleus =

Species of flowering plant

Plagiobothrys plurisepaleus (common name - White rochelia) is a species of flowering plant in the borage family. It is native to Australia, being found in all mainland states: New South Wales, Queensland, Victoria, South Australia, Western Australia and the Northern Territory, in moist areas in and around claypans.

== Description ==
The inflorescence is coiled in bud, but generally elongates in fruit. The pedicels are generally 0–1 mm, and the flower is bisexual with the sepals fused below the middle.

== Taxonomy ==
It was first described as Maccoya sepalea in 1859 by Ferdinand von Mueller, but was assigned to the genus, Plagiobothrys, in 1928 by Ivan Murray Johnston.
