= Ethmia plagiobothrae =

Scientific classification
- Kingdom: Animalia
- Phylum: Arthropoda
- Clade: Pancrustacea
- Class: Insecta
- Order: Lepidoptera
- Family: Depressariidae
- Genus: Ethmia
- Species: E. plagiobothrae

Binomial name
- Ethmia plagiobothrae Powell, 1973

Species of moth

Ethmia plagiobothrae is a moth in the family Depressariidae. It is found in California, United States.

The length of the forewings is 5.6–7 mm (0.22–0.28 in). The ground color of the forewings is blackish gray. The ground color of the hindwings is white, although the apical area is rather broadly blackish, except the fringe which is white. Adults are on wing in February and March.

The larvae have been reared on Plagiobothrys nothofulvus.
