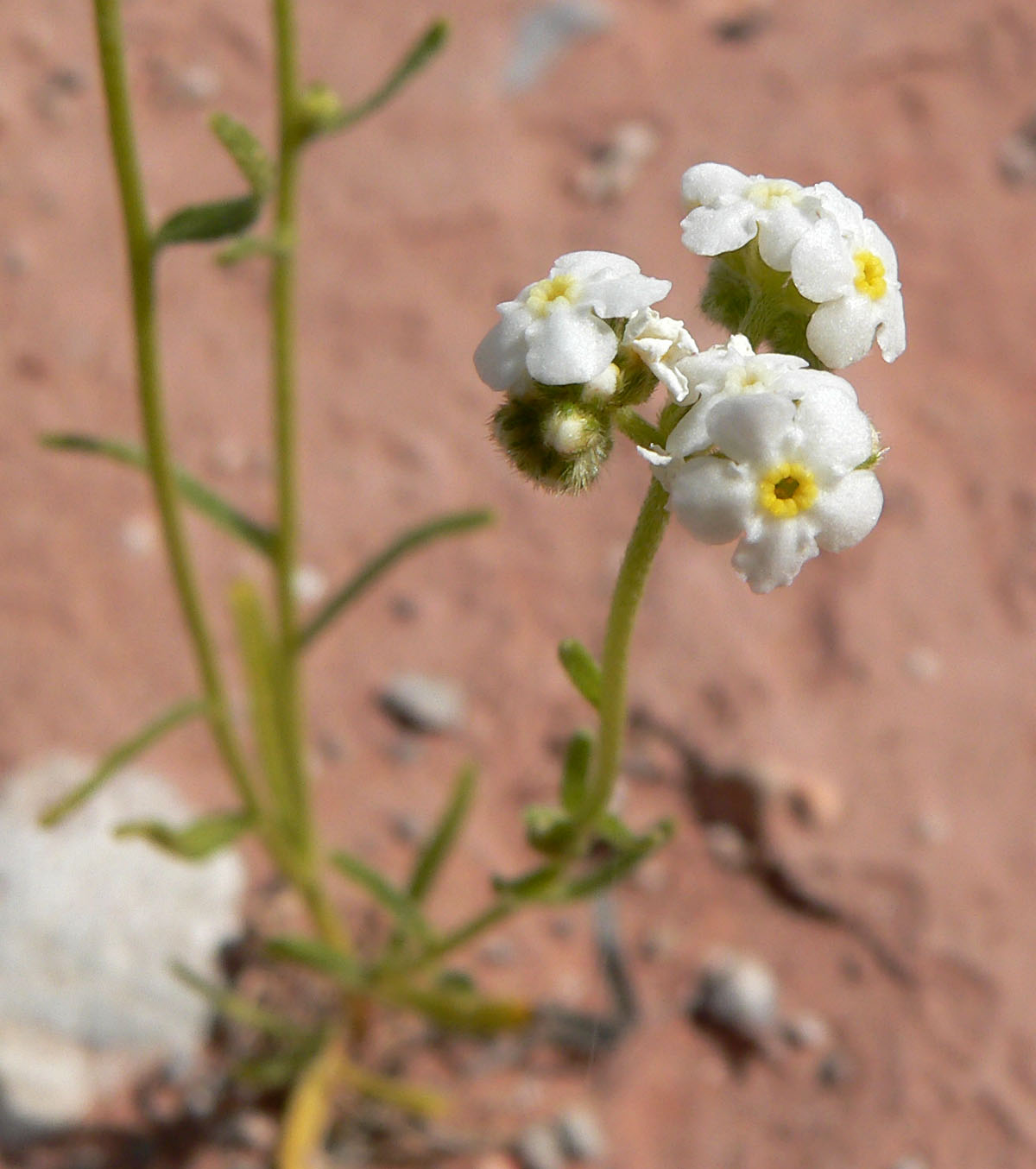
- Plagiobothrys jonesii

Scientific classification
- Kingdom: Plantae
- Clade: Embryophytes
- Clade: Tracheophytes
- Clade: Spermatophytes
- Clade: Angiosperms
- Clade: Eudicots
- Clade: Asterids
- Order: Boraginales
- Family: Boraginaceae
- Subfamily: Boraginoideae
- Genus: Plagiobothrys; Fisch. & C.A.Mey.

Type species
- Plagiobothrys rufescens Fisch. & C.A.Mey.

Species
- ~65, see text

Synonyms
- Allocarya Greene (1887); Allocaryastrum Brand (1931); Echidiocarya A.Gray ex Benth. & Hook.f. (1876); Echinoglochin (A.Gray) Brand (1925); Glyptocaryopsis Brand (1931); Maccoya F.Muell. (1859); Sonnea Greene (1887)

= Plagiobothrys =

Genus of flowering plants in the borage family

Plagiobothrys is a genus of flowering plants known commonly as popcorn flowers. These are small herbaceous plants which bear tiny white or yellow flowers. Their fruits are nutlets. Although these plants are found predominantly in North America and South America, five species are known from Australia. Of the approximately 65 species described, more than 15 are endemic to California.

== Description ==
The inflorescence is coiled in bud, but generally elongates in fruit. The pedicels are generally 0–1 mm, and the flower is bisexual with the sepals fused below the middle.

== Etymology ==
The genus name, Plagiobothrys, is derived from Greek to mean "sideways pit" and describes the position of nutlet attachment scar.

== Species ==
63 species are accepted.

- Plagiobothrys acanthocarpus (Piper) I.M.Johnst. – adobe popcornflower
- Plagiobothrys arizonicus (A.Gray) Greene ex A.Gray – Arizona popcornflower
- Plagiobothrys armeriifolius (Phil.) I.M.Johnst.
- Plagiobothrys austiniae (Greene) I.M.Johnst. – Austin's popcornflower
- Plagiobothrys australasicus (A.DC.) I.M.Johnst.
- Plagiobothrys bracteatus (Howell) I.M.Johnst. – bracted popcornflower
- Plagiobothrys calandrinioides (Phil.) I.M.Johnst.
- Plagiobothrys campestris Greene
- Plagiobothrys canescens Benth. – valley popcornflower
- Plagiobothrys chorisianus (Cham.) I.M.Johnst. – artist's popcornflower
- Plagiobothrys collinus (Phil.) I.M.Johnst. – Cooper's popcornflower
- Plagiobothrys congestus (Wedd.) I.M.Johnst.
- Plagiobothrys corymbosus (Ruiz & Pav.) I.M.Johnst.
- Plagiobothrys diffusus (Greene) I.M.Johnst. – San Francisco popcornflower
- Plagiobothrys distantiflorus (Piper) I.M.Johnst. – California popcornflower
- Plagiobothrys figuratus (Piper) I.M.Johnst. – fragrant popcornflower
- Plagiobothrys germainii (Phil.) I.M.Johnst.
- Plagiobothrys glaber (A.Gray) I.M.Johnst.
- Plagiobothrys glomeratus A.Gray
- Plagiobothrys glyptocarpus (Piper) I.M.Johnst. – sculptured popcornflower
- Plagiobothrys gracilis (Ruiz & Pav.) I.M.Johnst.
- Plagiobothrys greenei (A.Gray) I.M.Johnst. – Greene's popcornflower
- Plagiobothrys hirtus (Greene) I.M.Johnst. – rough popcornflower
- Plagiobothrys hispidus A.Gray – Cascade popcornflower
- Plagiobothrys humilis (Ruiz & Pav.) I.M.Johnst.
- Plagiobothrys humistratus (Greene) I.M.Johnst. – dwarf popcornflower
- Plagiobothrys hystriculus (Piper) I.M.Johnst.
- Plagiobothrys infectivus I.M.Johnst. – dye popcornflower
- Plagiobothrys lamprocarpus (Piper) I.M.Johnst.
- Plagiobothrys leptocladus (Greene) I.M.Johnst. – finebranched popcornflower
- Plagiobothrys linifolius (Lehm.) I.M.Johnst.
- Plagiobothrys lithocaryus (Greene ex A.Gray) I.M.Johnst.
- Plagiobothrys macbridei I.M.Johnst.
- Plagiobothrys mexicanus (J.F.Macbr.) I.M.Johnst.
- Plagiobothrys mollis (A.Gray) I.M.Johnst. – soft popcornflower
- Plagiobothrys muricatus (Ruiz & Pav.) I.M.Johnst. (synonym Plagiobothrys fulvus (Hook. & Arn.) I.M.Johnst.) – fulvous popcornflower
- Plagiobothrys myosotoides (Lehm.) Brand
- Plagiobothrys nothofulvus (A.Gray) A.Gray – rusty popcornflower
- Plagiobothrys oppositifolius (Phil.) I.M.Johnst.
- Plagiobothrys orientalis (L.) I.M.Johnst.
- Plagiobothrys orthostatus J.M.Black
- Plagiobothrys parishii I.M.Johnst. – Parish's popcornflower
- Plagiobothrys pedicellaris (Phil.) I.M.Johnst.
- Plagiobothrys plurisepaleus (F.Muell.) I.M.Johnst.
- Plagiobothrys polycaulis (Phil.) I.M.Johnst.
- Plagiobothrys pratensis (Phil.) I.M.Johnst.
- Plagiobothrys procumbens (Colla) A.Gray
- Plagiobothrys pulchellus (Phil.) I.M.Johnst.
- Plagiobothrys reticulatus (Piper) I.M.Johnst.
- Plagiobothrys salsus (Brandegee) I.M.Johnst.
- Plagiobothrys scouleri (Hook. & Arn.) I.M.Johnst. – Scouler's popcornflower
- Plagiobothrys scriptus (Greene) I.M.Johnst.
- Plagiobothrys shastensis Greene ex A.Gray – Shasta popcornflower
- Plagiobothrys stipitatus (Greene) I.M.Johnst. – stalked popcornflower
- Plagiobothrys strictus (Greene) I.M.Johnst. – Calistoga popcornflower
- Plagiobothrys tenellus (Nutt.) A.Gray – Pacific popcornflower
- Plagiobothrys tener (Greene) I.M.Johnst.
- Plagiobothrys torreyi (A.Gray) A.Gray
- Plagiobothrys trachycarpus (A.Gray) I.M.Johnst.
- Plagiobothrys uliginosus (Phil.) I.M.Johnst.
- Plagiobothrys uncinatus J.T.Howell – Salinas Valley popcornflower
- Plagiobothrys undulatus (Piper) I.M.Johnst.
- Plagiobothrys verrucosus (Phil.) I.M.Johnst.

=== Formerly placed here ===
- Amsinckiopsis kingii (S.Watson) Guilliams, Hasenstab & B.G.Baldwin (as Plagiobothrys kingii (S.Watson) A.Gray) – Great Basin popcornflower
- Simpsonanthus jonesii (A.Gray) Guilliams, Hasenstab & B.G.Baldwin (as Plagiobothrys jonesii A.Gray) – Mojave popcornflower
