= Plagiobothrys greenei =

Scientific classification
- Kingdom: Plantae
- Clade: Tracheophytes
- Clade: Angiosperms
- Clade: Eudicots
- Clade: Asterids
- Order: Boraginales
- Family: Boraginaceae
- Genus: Plagiobothrys
- Species: P. greenei

Binomial name
- Plagiobothrys greenei (A.Gray) I.M.Johnst.

Species of flowering plant

Plagiobothrys greenei is a species of flowering plant in the borage family known by the common name Greene's popcornflower. It is native to Oregon and northern California, where it grows in moist woodland and grassland habitat. It is an annual herb with a spreading or erect stem growing 10 to 40 centimeters long. The leaves along the stem are 1 to 5 centimeters long and the herbage is coated in rough hairs. The inflorescence is a series of tiny flowers with white five-lobed corollas no more than 3 millimeters wide. The fruit is a minute nutlet with a surface covered in long prickles.
