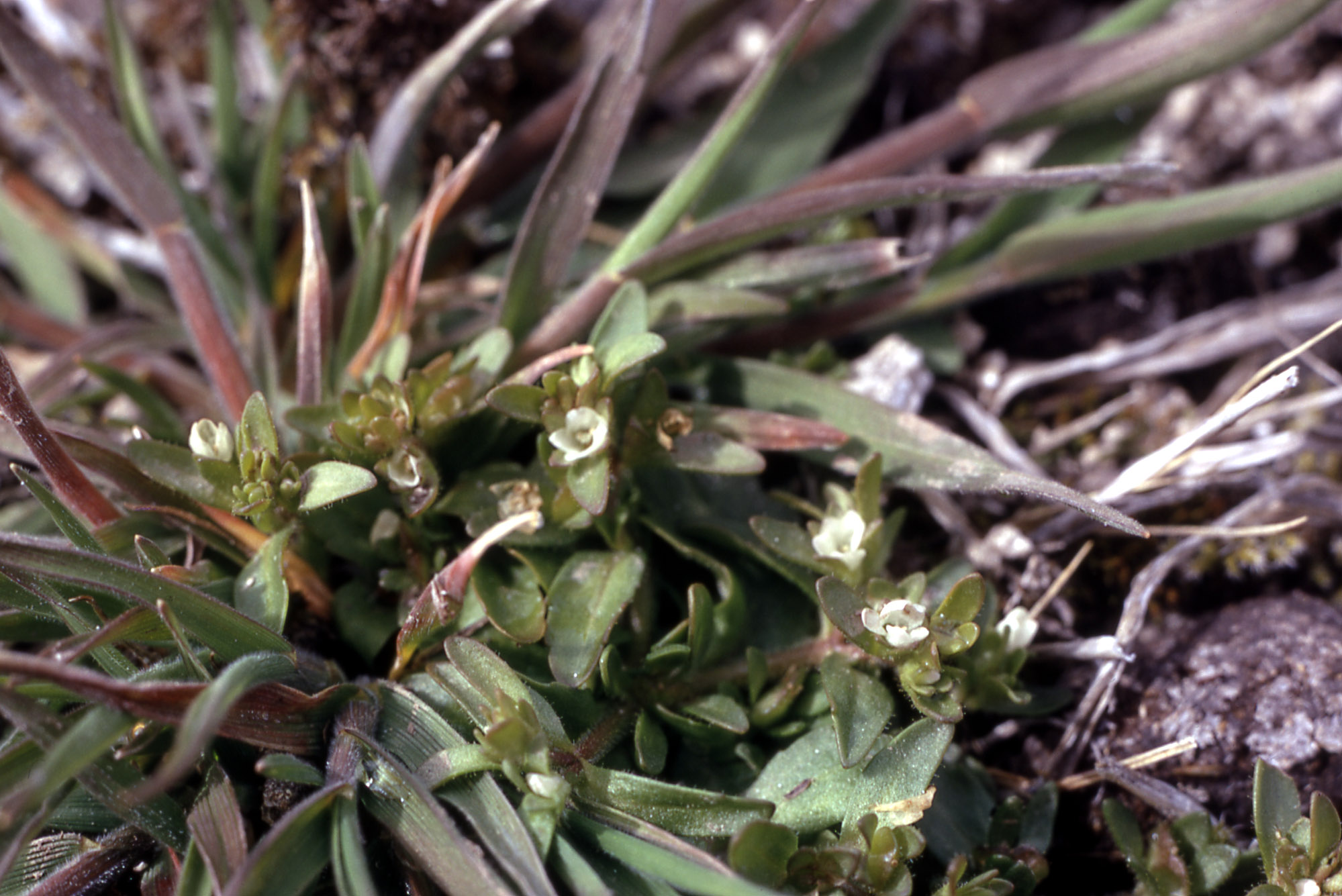

Scientific classification
- Kingdom: Plantae
- Clade: Tracheophytes
- Clade: Angiosperms
- Clade: Eudicots
- Clade: Asterids
- Order: Boraginales
- Family: Boraginaceae
- Genus: Plagiobothrys
- Species: P. scouleri

Binomial name
- Plagiobothrys scouleri (Hook. & Arn.) I.M.Johnst.

= Plagiobothrys scouleri =

Species of flowering plant

Plagiobothrys scouleri is a common species of flowering plant in the borage family known by the common name Scouler's popcornflower and white forget-me-not. It is native to North America, where it can be found from Alaska throughout southern Canada and the western and central United States. It is present in the United Kingdom as an occasional introduced species.

== Description ==
Plagiobothrys scouleri often grows in moist areas. It is an annual herb growing prostrate or upright to about 20 centimeters long. The leaves are linear and hairy in texture. The inflorescence is a series of tiny five-lobed flowers each 2 to 4 millimeters wide. The flower is white, usually with yellow appendages at the center.
