= Petrogenia =

Scientific classification
- Kingdom: Plantae
- Clade: Tracheophytes
- Clade: Angiosperms
- Clade: Eudicots
- Clade: Asterids
- Order: Solanales
- Family: Convolvulaceae
- Genus: Petrogenia; I.M.Johnst.
- Species: P. repens

Binomial name
- Petrogenia repens I.M.Johnst.

Genus of plants

Petrogenia is a monotypic genus of flowering plants belonging to the family Convolvulaceae. The only species is Petrogenia repens.

Its native range is Texas to Northeastern Mexico.
