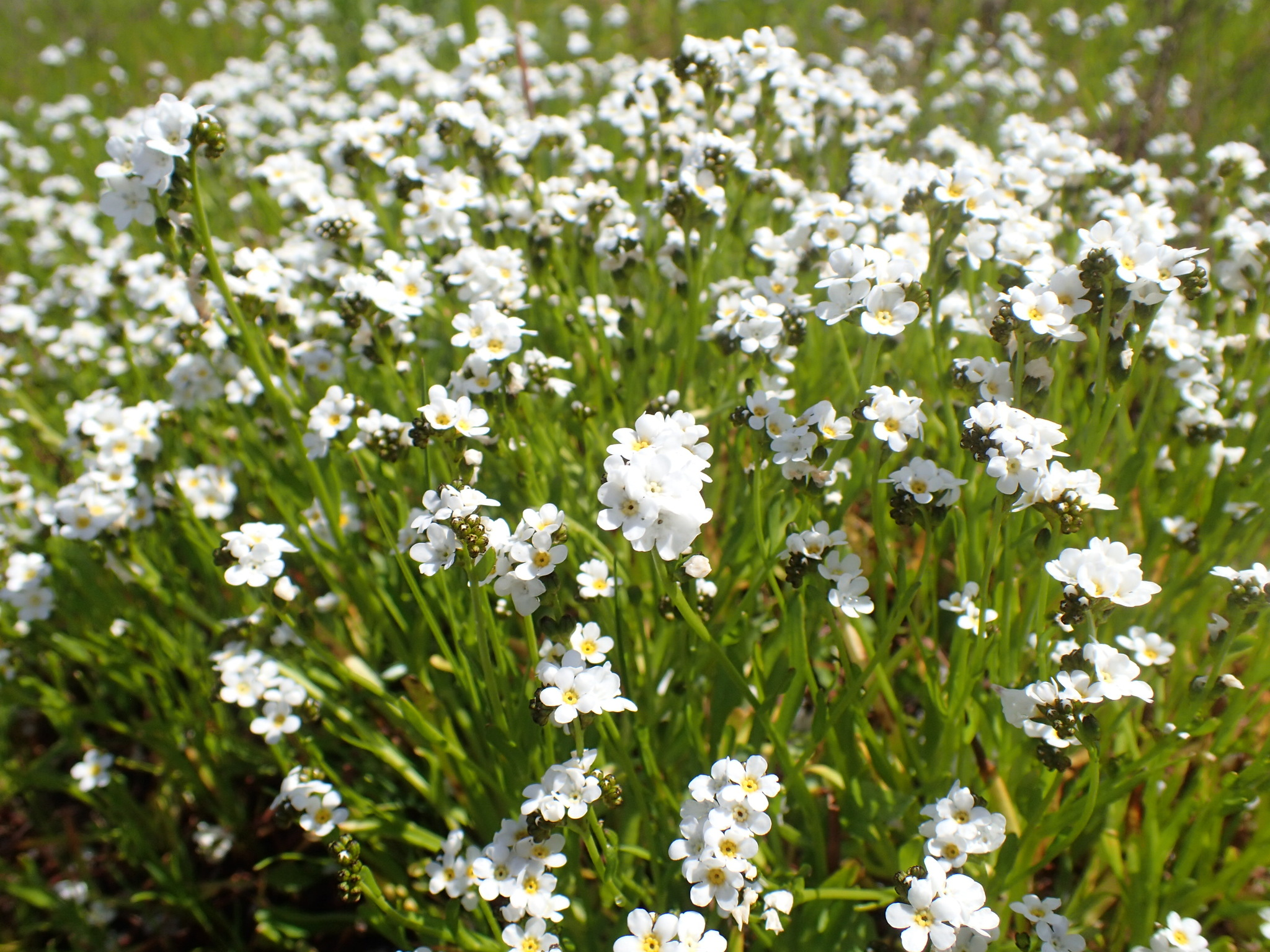

Conservation status
- Endangered (ESA)

- Critically Imperiled (NatureServe)

Scientific classification
- Kingdom: Plantae
- Clade: Tracheophytes
- Clade: Angiosperms
- Clade: Eudicots
- Clade: Asterids
- Order: Boraginales
- Family: Boraginaceae
- Genus: Plagiobothrys
- Species: P. strictus

Binomial name
- Plagiobothrys strictus (Greene) I.M.Johnst.

Synonyms
- Allocarya stricta; Krynitzkia stricta

= Plagiobothrys strictus =

Plant species in the forget-me-not family

Plagiobothrys strictus is a rare species of flowering plant in the borage family known by the common name Calistoga popcornflower. It is endemic to Napa County, California, where it is known from only two small locations near Calistoga.

== Description ==
This is an annual herb growing erect 10 to 40 centimeters tall. It is mostly hairless except for the sepals, which have some rough hairs. The leaves are located along the stem and measure 4 to 9 centimeters long. The inflorescence is made up of paired branches bearing several five-lobed white flowers each about half a centimeter wide. The fruit is a ribbed nutlet 1 or 2 millimeters long.

== Taxonomy ==
In 1892 Edward Lee Greene described a new species in the genus Allocarya, a genus that he described in 1887. The accepted name was created in 1923 when Ivan Murray Johnston described it as a species in Plagiobothrys named Plagiobothrys strictus. Together with its genus it is part of the Boraginaceae family. It has no subspecies and three Homotypic synonyms.

Table of Synonyms
Name	Year	Rank
Allocarya californica var. stricta (Greene) Jeps.	1901	variety
Allocarya stricta Greene	1892	species
Krynitzkia stricta (Greene) Rattan	1898	species

== Distribution and habitat ==
It grows in wet grassy habitat kept moist by runoff from hot springs and pools. The combined area of land containing the two populations was estimated to be less than 80 square meters in 1990. The species is threatened by the disturbance of its grassland habitat; both populations are on privately owned, unprotected land; one of these is situated next to a small airport.

== Endangered status ==
Plagiobothrys strictus is a federally listed endangered species of the United States.
