= Plagiobothrys humistratus =

Conservation status
- Imperiled (NatureServe)

Scientific classification
- Kingdom: Plantae
- Clade: Tracheophytes
- Clade: Angiosperms
- Clade: Eudicots
- Clade: Asterids
- Order: Boraginales
- Family: Boraginaceae
- Genus: Plagiobothrys
- Species: P. humistratus

Binomial name
- Plagiobothrys humistratus (Greene) I.M.Johnst.

Species of flowering plant

Plagiobothrys humistratus is a species of flowering plant in the borage family known by the common names dwarf popcornflower or low popcornflower. It is endemic to the Central Valley of California, where it grows in grassland habitats, including vernal pools and other wetland areas.

== Description ==
Plagiobothrys humistratus is an annual herb growing prostrate, with stems extending up to 40 centimeters in length. The leaves along the stem are 3 to 8 centimeters long and coated in rough hairs. The inflorescence is a series of tiny white flowers accompanied by bracts. Each five-lobed flower is 1 or 2 millimeters in length. The fruit is a narrow oblong nutlet under 3 millimeters in length, often coated in minute bristles.
