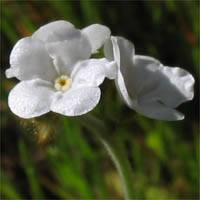

Scientific classification
- Kingdom: Plantae
- Clade: Tracheophytes
- Clade: Angiosperms
- Clade: Eudicots
- Clade: Asterids
- Order: Boraginales
- Family: Boraginaceae
- Genus: Plagiobothrys
- Species: P. nothofulvus

Binomial name
- Plagiobothrys nothofulvus (A.Gray) A.Gray

= Plagiobothrys nothofulvus =

Species of flowering plant

Plagiobothrys nothofulvus is a species of flowering plant in the family Boraginaceae known by the common names rusty popcornflower and foothill snowdrops. It is native to western North America from Washington, and California, to northern Mexico. It is a spring wildflower in grassy meadows, woodlands, coastal sage scrub, and wetland-riparian habitats.

== Description ==
It is an annual herb with deep roots, especially on drier soils. It grows up to 50 centimetres (20 in) in height. It contains purple sap, the herbage edged with purple or rusty red and bleeding purple when crushed. It is hairy in texture, the hairs rough and sharp. The spatula-shaped leaves are up to 10 cm (4 in) long, mostly in a tuft near the base of the stem, with smaller leaves above.

Blooming from March to May, the inflorescence is a series of five-lobed white flowers about 6 millimetres (1/4 in) wide. The fruit is divided into four nutlets, rounded with a pointed tip about 2 mm long and borne singly, in pairs or triplets which are solidly attached to each other.

=== Reproduction ===
As in many other members of the family Boraginaceae, the flower consists of five petals and are bisexual with both male and female parts represented in the flower. Bees and butterflies are the main pollinators transferring the haploid microgametophyte, or pollen grain, to the pistil. The microgametophyte will then travel down the pistil to the ovule to fertilize the haploid macrogametophyte, or egg. Each pollen grain contains two sperm cells for double fertilization of the egg. One fertilization event forms a diploid zygote and the other fertilization event forms the endosperm of the seed.

== Etymology ==
The genus name Plagiobothrys refers to a sideways pit formed by the position of the nutlet attachment scar.

Nothofulvus comes from the words nothus, meaning bastard or false, and fulvus, meaning yellowish, as it had been at first been mistaken for P. fulvus (named for the dense tawny hairs on its calyx and pedicel).

== Distribution and habitat ==
The species ranges from southern Washington to northern Baja California.

The species can be found in grassy meadows, especially along the coast. It can also be found in woodlands, coastal sage scrub, and wetland-riparian habitats and are often associated with serpentine or plutonic soils. Associated species that commonly grow in similar grassland habitats include Aster chilensis, Lotus angustissimus, Plantago lanceolata, Galium parisiense, and Brodiaea terrestris.

== Ecology ==
Plagiobothrys nothofulvus is food for many different animals. Deer, ground squirrels, and insects often forage for the plant. Turtles will also feed on the flowers in riparian zones. Black seed-harvesting ants will eat the seeds of popcorn flowers. Species of beetles will use the flower as a breeding platform. Butterflies, moths, and bees drink its nectar as they pollinate the flowers. Ctenuchid moths are frequently found on the flowers, the importance of their interactions is currently unknown.

== Conservation ==
Plagiobothrys nothofulvus is a federally listed endangered species in Oregon. The major threat to Plagiobothry nothofulvus is habitat loss by the transformation of its historical range to agricultural land. The loss of seasonal wetlands by habitat degradation and changing climate as well as the introduction of invasive species also pose large threats to the rusty popcorn flower. Efforts to restore the population include establishing protected populations, saving seeds, providing education to land owners, and restoring natural habitats.
