= Plagiobothrys glyptocarpus =

Conservation status
- Vulnerable (NatureServe)

Scientific classification
- Kingdom: Plantae
- Clade: Tracheophytes
- Clade: Angiosperms
- Clade: Eudicots
- Clade: Asterids
- Order: Boraginales
- Family: Boraginaceae
- Genus: Plagiobothrys
- Species: P. glyptocarpus

Binomial name
- Plagiobothrys glyptocarpus (Piper) I.M.Johnst.

Species of flowering plant

Plagiobothrys glyptocarpus is a species of flowering plant in the borage family known by the common name sculptured popcornflower. It is native to Oregon and northern California, where it grows in moist woodland and grassland habitat. It is an annual herb growing mostly erect to a maximum height near half a meter. The leaves along the stem are 4 to 8 centimeters long and the herbage is coated in rough hairs. The inflorescence is a series of small white flowers with rounded five-lobed corollas 2 to 9 millimeters wide. The fruit is a nutlet about 2 millimeters wide with a rough, tubercled or ribbed surface visible on magnification.
