= Ivanjohnstonia =

Scientific classification
- Kingdom: Plantae
- Clade: Tracheophytes
- Clade: Angiosperms
- Clade: Eudicots
- Clade: Asterids
- Order: Boraginales
- Family: Boraginaceae
- Genus: Ivanjohnstonia; Kazmi
- Species: I. jaunsariensis

Binomial name
- Ivanjohnstonia jaunsariensis Kazmi

Genus of plants

Ivanjohnstonia is a monotypic genus of flowering plants belonging to the family Boraginaceae. The only species is Ivanjohnstonia jaunsariensis Kazmi Its native range is the Western Himalaya.

The genus name of Ivanjohnstonia is in honour of Ivan Murray Johnston (1898–1960), an American botanist. and the Latin specific epithet of jaunsariensis refers to the Jaunsar-Bawar region in northern India. Both genus and species were first described and published in Sultania Vol.1 on page 1 in 1975.
