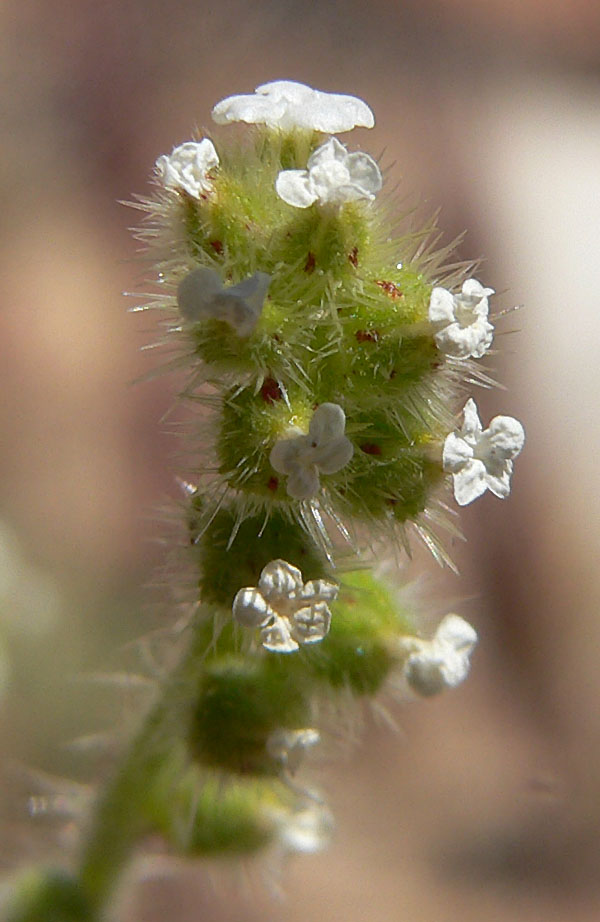

Conservation status
- Secure (NatureServe)

Scientific classification
- Kingdom: Plantae
- Clade: Embryophytes
- Clade: Tracheophytes
- Clade: Spermatophytes
- Clade: Angiosperms
- Clade: Eudicots
- Clade: Asterids
- Order: Boraginales
- Family: Boraginaceae
- Genus: Plagiobothrys
- Species: P. arizonicus

Binomial name
- Plagiobothrys arizonicus (A.Gray) Greene ex A.Gray

= Plagiobothrys arizonicus =

Species of flowering plant

Plagiobothrys arizonicus is a species of flowering plant in the borage family known by the common name Arizona popcornflower. Other common names include bloodweed and lipstick plant.

== Distribution ==
The plant is native to the southwestern United States, California, and Sonora (Mexico). It is a common wildflower in many types of mountain, Mojave Desert and Sonoran Desert, and California chaparral and woodland habitats.

== Description ==
Plagiobothrys arizonicus is an annual herb with a spreading or erect stem 10 to 40 centimeters in length. The leaves are located in a basal rosette about the stem, with smaller ones along the length of the stem. The plant is coated in long, rough, sharp hairs. The herbage leaks a staining purple juice when crushed.

The inflorescence is a series of regular bracts and tiny flowers, each five-lobed white corolla less than 3 millimeters wide. The paired nutlets are arch-shaped and not prickly.
