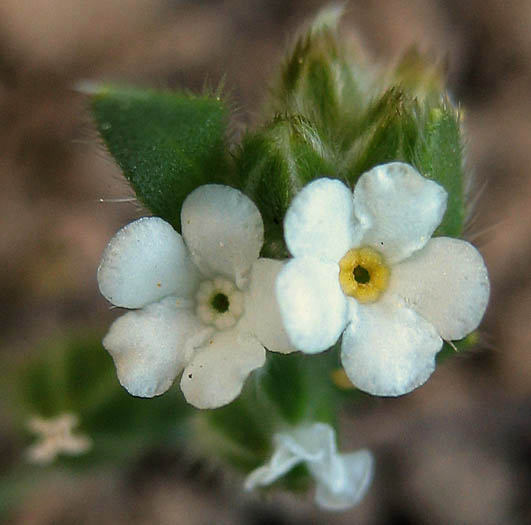

Conservation status
- Secure (NatureServe)

Scientific classification
- Kingdom: Plantae
- Clade: Tracheophytes
- Clade: Angiosperms
- Clade: Eudicots
- Clade: Asterids
- Order: Boraginales
- Family: Boraginaceae
- Genus: Plagiobothrys
- Species: P. canescens

Binomial name
- Plagiobothrys canescens Benth.

= Plagiobothrys canescens =

Species of flowering plant

Plagiobothrys canescens is a species of flowering plant in the borage family known by the common name valley popcornflower. It is endemic to California, where it is a common wildflower in valley, foothill, desert, coastline, and canyon habitat in the central and southern regions of the state.

Plagiobothrys canescens is an annual herb with a spreading or erect stem 10 to 60 centimeters in length. The leaves are located in a basal rosette about the base of the stem, with smaller ones located along the stem's length. The plant is coated in long, rough hairs and sometimes bristles. It is purple-edged and -veined and leaks purple juice when crushed. The inflorescence is a series of tiny flowers and hairy bracts. Each five-lobed white corolla measures 2 to 3 millimeters wide. The fruit is a rounded, arched nutlet no more than 2 millimeters long textured with cross-ribs.
