= Plagiobothrys tenellus =

Scientific classification
- Kingdom: Plantae
- Clade: Tracheophytes
- Clade: Angiosperms
- Clade: Eudicots
- Clade: Asterids
- Order: Boraginales
- Family: Boraginaceae
- Genus: Plagiobothrys
- Species: P. tenellus

Binomial name
- Plagiobothrys tenellus (Nutt. ex Hook.) A.Gray

Species of flowering plant

Plagiobothrys tenellus is a species of flowering plant in the borage family known by the common names Pacific popcornflower and slender popcornflower. It is native to western North America from British Columbia to Mexico, where it is a common member of the flora in several types of habitat.

== Description ==
Plagiobothrys tenellus is an annual herb producing several erect stems up to about 30 centimeters tall. It is very hairy in texture, the hairs long and white. The leaves are located in a basal rosette around the stem and there are a few smaller ones along the stem itself. The inflorescence is a coiling branch bearing many small five-lobed white flowers. Each flower is 1 to 3 millimeters wide. The fruit is a tiny cross-shaped nutlet covered in bumps and grooves.
