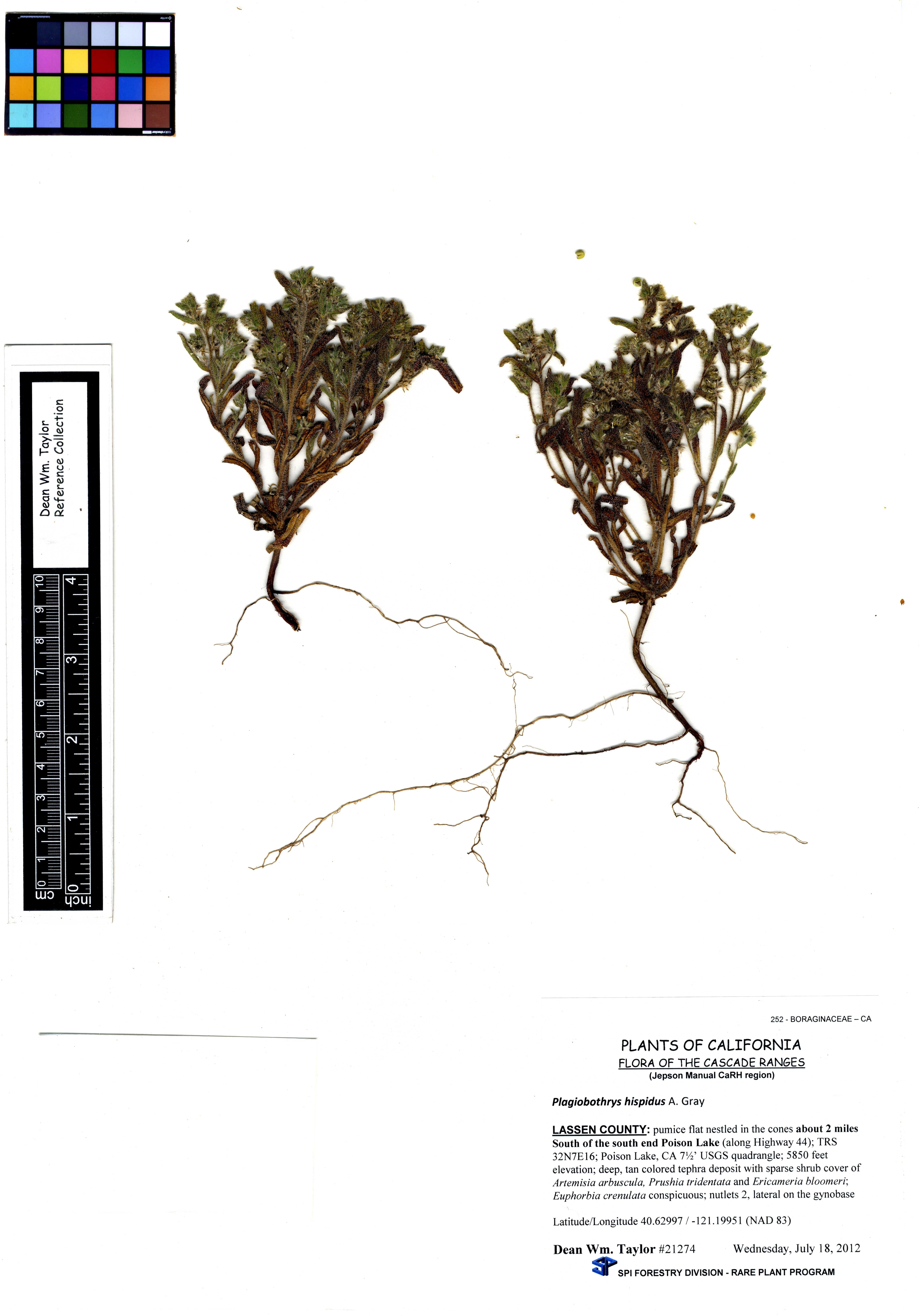

Scientific classification
- Kingdom: Plantae
- Clade: Tracheophytes
- Clade: Angiosperms
- Clade: Eudicots
- Clade: Asterids
- Order: Boraginales
- Family: Boraginaceae
- Genus: Plagiobothrys
- Species: P. hispidus

Binomial name
- Plagiobothrys hispidus A.Gray

= Plagiobothrys hispidus =

Species of flowering plant

Plagiobothrys hispidus is a species of flowering plant in the borage family known by the common names Cascade popcornflower or bristly popcornflower. It is native to the mountains and plateaus around the intersection of Oregon, northeastern California, and northwestern Nevada, where it grows in dry, sandy habitat. It is an annual herb growing erect to a maximum height around 20 centimeters. It is very hairy, with rough and woolly hairs. The pointed leaves are up to 4 centimeters long. The inflorescence is a short, coiling series of tiny white flowers each only about a millimeter wide.
