= Amsinckiopsis =

Scientific classification
- Kingdom: Plantae
- Clade: Tracheophytes
- Clade: Angiosperms
- Clade: Eudicots
- Clade: Asterids
- Order: Boraginales
- Family: Boraginaceae
- Subfamily: Boraginoideae
- Genus: Amsinckiopsis (I.M.Johnst.) Guilliams, Hasenstab & B.G.Baldwin
- Species: A. kingii

Binomial name
- Amsinckiopsis kingii (S.Watson) Guilliams, Hasenstab & B.G.Baldwin

Synonyms
- Eritrichium kingii S.Watson; Plagiobothrys kingii (S.Watson) A.Gray; Sonnea kingii (S.Watson) Greene

Genus of flowering plants

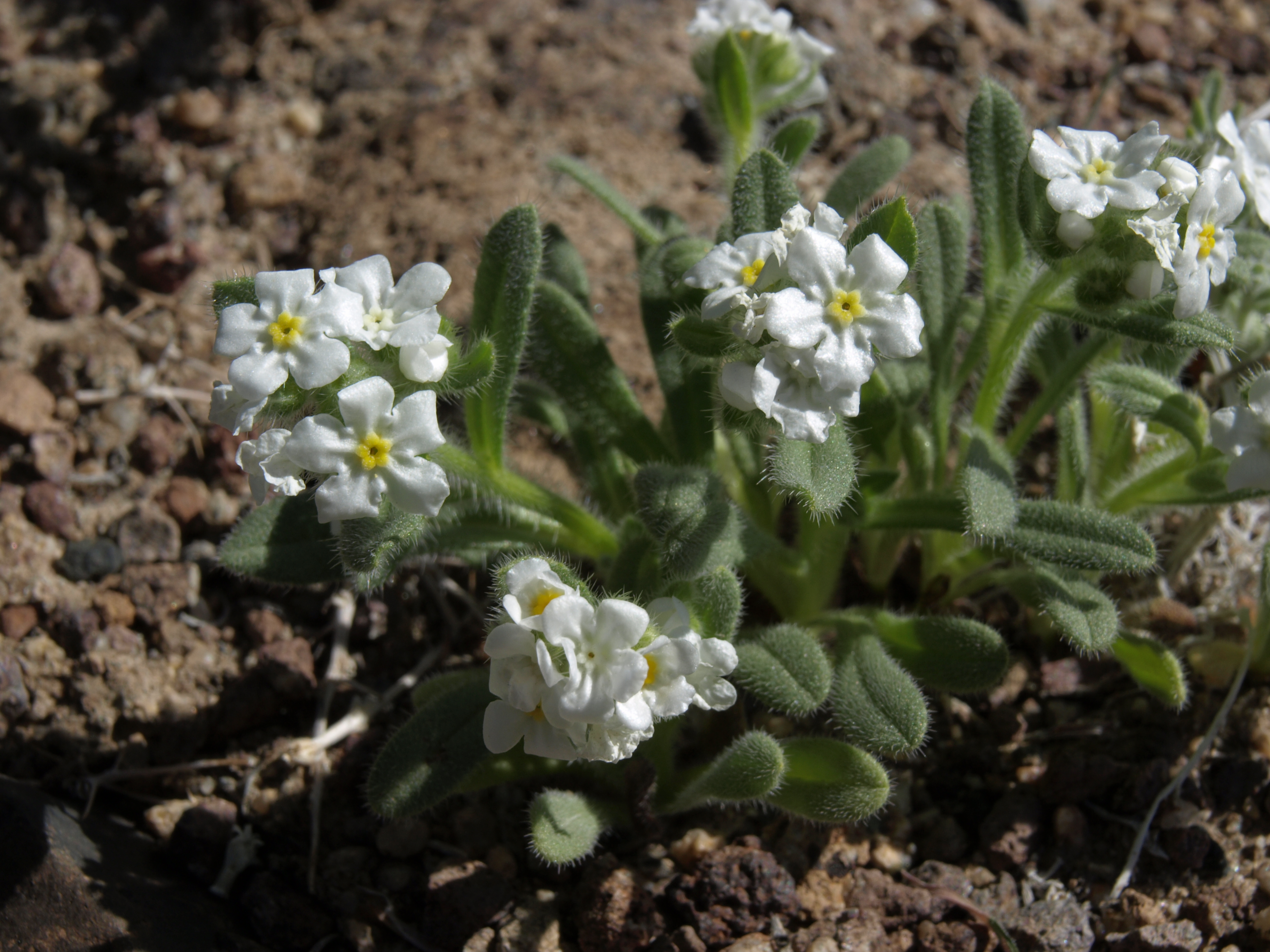
Great Basin popcorn flower, Plagiobothrys kingii, Churchill Butte, elevation 1315 m (4320 ft)

Amsinkiopsis is a monotypic genus of flowering plants in the borage family consisting of the species Amsinckiopsis kingii. A. kingii was previously considered part of the genus Plagiobothrys, until phylogenetic study proved the genus to be polyphyletic (coming from more than one common ancestor).

Amsinkiopsis kingii, known by the common name Great Basin popcornflower, is native to the Great Basin and Mojave Desert of the United States, where it grows in desert and plateau scrub habitat, among saltbush and on rocky slopes and flats.

== Description ==
Amsinkiopsis kingii is an annual herb growing mostly upright or erect and just a few centimeters tall to a maximum height around 40 centimeters. It is hairy in texture, the hairs coarse and rough. The leaves are alternately arranged along the stem and no more than 6 centimeters long. The inflorescence is a series of tiny white flowers each 4 to 7 millimeters wide. The fruit is a tiny arched, ribbed nutlet.
