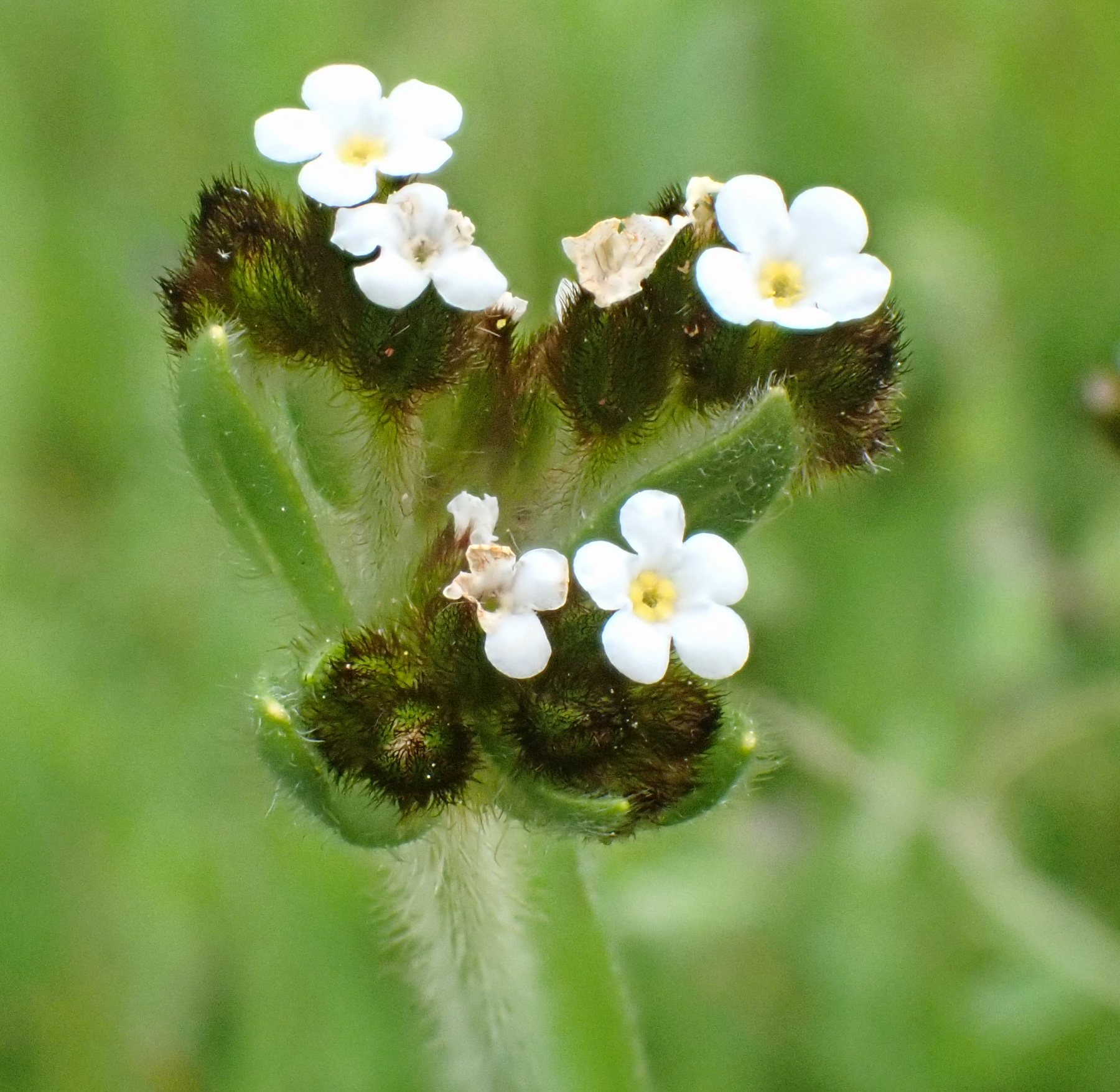

Scientific classification
- Kingdom: Plantae
- Clade: Tracheophytes
- Clade: Angiosperms
- Clade: Eudicots
- Clade: Asterids
- Order: Boraginales
- Family: Boraginaceae
- Genus: Plagiobothrys
- Species: P. fulvus

Binomial name
- Plagiobothrys fulvus (Hook. & Arn.) I.M.Johnst.

= Plagiobothrys fulvus =

Species of flowering plant

Plagiobothrys fulvus is a species of flowering plant in the borage family known by the common names field popcornflower or fulvous popcornflower. It is native to California and Oregon in the United States, as well as Chile.

It is a common wildflower in several types of habitat, including grasslands. It is an annual herb with a very hairy stem growing erect to a maximum height around 60 centimeters. The leaves occur in a rosette around the base of the stem and along the stem's length in an alternate arrangement. They are coated in hairs and leak purple juice when crushed. The inflorescence is a curving series of small flowers. Each flower has a white corolla under half a centimeter wide and a calyx of sepals which are slightly longer than the corolla. The fruit is a pair or quartet of tiny angular ribbed nutlets.
