= Euplassa isernii =

Conservation status
- Data Deficient (IUCN 3.1)

Scientific classification
- Kingdom: Plantae
- Clade: Embryophytes
- Clade: Tracheophytes
- Clade: Angiosperms
- Clade: Eudicots
- Order: Proteales
- Family: Proteaceae
- Genus: Euplassa
- Species: E. isernii

Binomial name
- Euplassa isernii Cuatrec.

Species of plant endemic to Peru

Euplassa isernii is a species of plant in the family Proteaceae. It is endemic to Peru.
