= Plagiobothrys shastensis =

Scientific classification
- Kingdom: Plantae
- Clade: Tracheophytes
- Clade: Angiosperms
- Clade: Eudicots
- Clade: Asterids
- Order: Boraginales
- Family: Boraginaceae
- Genus: Plagiobothrys
- Species: P. shastensis

Binomial name
- Plagiobothrys shastensis Greene ex A.Gray

Species of flowering plant

Plagiobothrys shastensis is an uncommon species of flowering plant in the borage family known by the common name Shasta popcornflower. It is native to southern Oregon and northern California, where it grows in grassland, woodland, and other types of habitat. It is an annual herb growing erect to about 30 centimeters in maximum height. It is coated in hairs. The leaves are located in a basal rosette with a few arranged alternately along the stem. The inflorescence is a straight branch holding paired flowers, rarely coiling at the tip as many other Plagiobothrys do. Each tiny white flower has a five-lobed corolla no more than 3 millimeters wide. The fruit is a cross-shaped nutlet 2 or 3 millimeters wide divided in half by a rough scar.
