= Plagiobothrys uncinatus =

Conservation status
- Imperiled (NatureServe)

Scientific classification
- Kingdom: Plantae
- Clade: Tracheophytes
- Clade: Angiosperms
- Clade: Eudicots
- Clade: Asterids
- Order: Boraginales
- Family: Boraginaceae
- Genus: Plagiobothrys
- Species: P. uncinatus

Binomial name
- Plagiobothrys uncinatus J.T.Howell

Species of flowering plant

Plagiobothrys uncinatus is a species of flowering plant in the borage family known by the common names Salinas Valley popcornflower and hooked popcornflower. It is endemic to the Central Coast Ranges of California, where it is known mainly from the Santa Lucia Mountains and Gabilan Range in Monterey County.

== Description ==
Plagiobothrys uncinatus, Salinas Valley popcornflower, grows in chaparral and other habitat in the canyons. It is an annual herb producing a decumbent or erect stem measuring up to about 20 centimeters long. It is hairy in texture, the hairs stiff and rough, and the herbage is edged with red or purple and bleeds purple juice when crushed. The leaves are 1 or 2 centimeters long, located in a basal rosette around the stem and along the stem in an alternate arrangement.

The inflorescence is a series of tiny five-lobed white flowers each about 2 millimeters wide. They are surrounded by sepals which are coated in long white hairs with hooked tips.
