= Sinojohnstonia =

Scientific classification
- Kingdom: Plantae
- Clade: Tracheophytes
- Clade: Angiosperms
- Clade: Eudicots
- Clade: Asterids
- Order: Boraginales
- Family: Boraginaceae
- Genus: Sinojohnstonia; Hu (1936)

Genus of plants

Sinojohnstonia is a genus of flowering plants belonging to the family Boraginaceae.

It is native to China (within north-central, south-central, south-east and Inner Mongolia regions).

The genus name of Sinojohnstonia is in honour of Ivan Murray Johnston (1898–1960), a United States botanist. The Latin suffix of Sino- refers to sinensis meaning from China. It was first described and published in Bull. Fan Mem. Inst. Biol., Bot. Vol.7 on page 201 in 1936.

== Known species ==
According to Kew:

- Sinojohnstonia chekiangensis (Migo) W.T.Wang ex Z.Ying Zhang
- Sinojohnstonia moupinensis (Franch.) W.T.Wang ex Z.Ying Zhang
- Sinojohnstonia plantaginea Hu
- Sinojohnstonia ruhuaii W.B.Liao & Lei Wang
