= Ivania (plant) =

Scientific classification
- Kingdom: Plantae
- Clade: Tracheophytes
- Clade: Angiosperms
- Clade: Eudicots
- Clade: Rosids
- Order: Brassicales
- Family: Brassicaceae
- Genus: Ivania; O.E.Schulz

Genus of plants

Ivania is a genus of flowering plants belonging to the family Brassicaceae.

It is native to Chile.

The genus name of Ivania is in honour of Ivan Murray Johnston (1898–1960), an American botanist. It was first described and published in Repert. Spec. Nov. Regni Veg. Vol.33 on page 188 in 1933.

Species:

- Ivania cremnophila (I.M.Johnst.) O.E.Schulz
- Ivania juncalensis Al-Shehbaz
