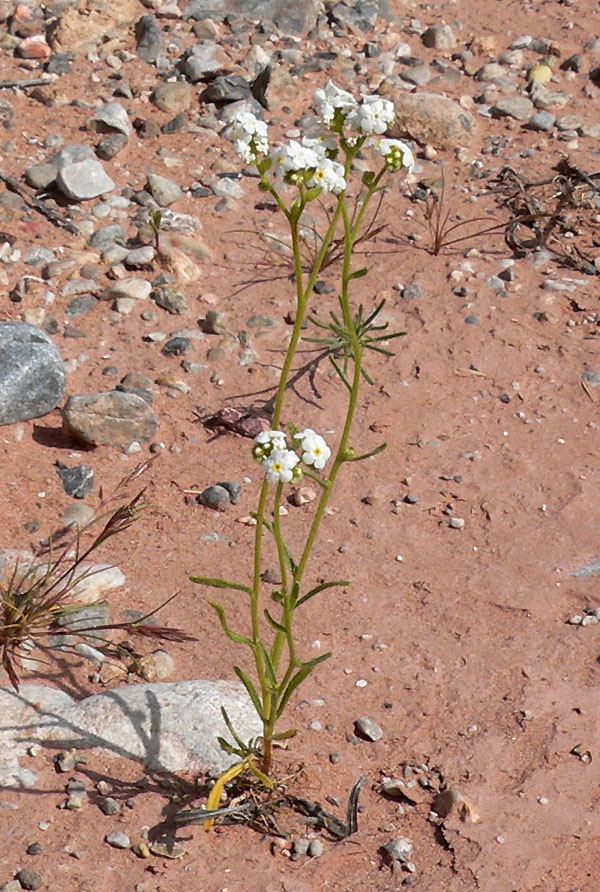

Conservation status
- Apparently Secure (NatureServe)

Scientific classification
- Kingdom: Plantae
- Clade: Tracheophytes
- Clade: Angiosperms
- Clade: Eudicots
- Clade: Asterids
- Order: Boraginales
- Family: Boraginaceae
- Genus: Simpsonanthus; Guilliams, Hasenstab & B.G.Baldwin (2020)
- Species: S. jonesii

Binomial name
- Simpsonanthus jonesii (A.Gray) Guilliams, Hasenstab & B.G.Baldwin (2020)

Synonyms
- Plagiobothrys jonesii A.Gray (1886); Sonnea jonesii (A.Gray) Greene (1887)

= Simpsonanthus =

Species of flowering plant

Simpsonanthus jonesii is a species of flowering plant in the borage family known by the common name Mojave popcornflower. It is the sole species in genus Simpsonanthus. It is native to the southwestern United States and northern Mexico, where it grows in desert mountains and flats in scrub and woodland habitat.

== Description ==
Simpsonanthus jonesii is an annual herb growing mostly upright or erect, approaching a maximum height near 40 centimeters. It is hairy in texture, the hairs rough, sharp, and bristly. The leaves alternately arranged along the stem are up to 10 centimeters long. The inflorescence is a series of tiny white flowers each 1 to 3 millimeters wide. The fruit is a tiny bumpy nutlet borne in clusters of 3 or 4.
