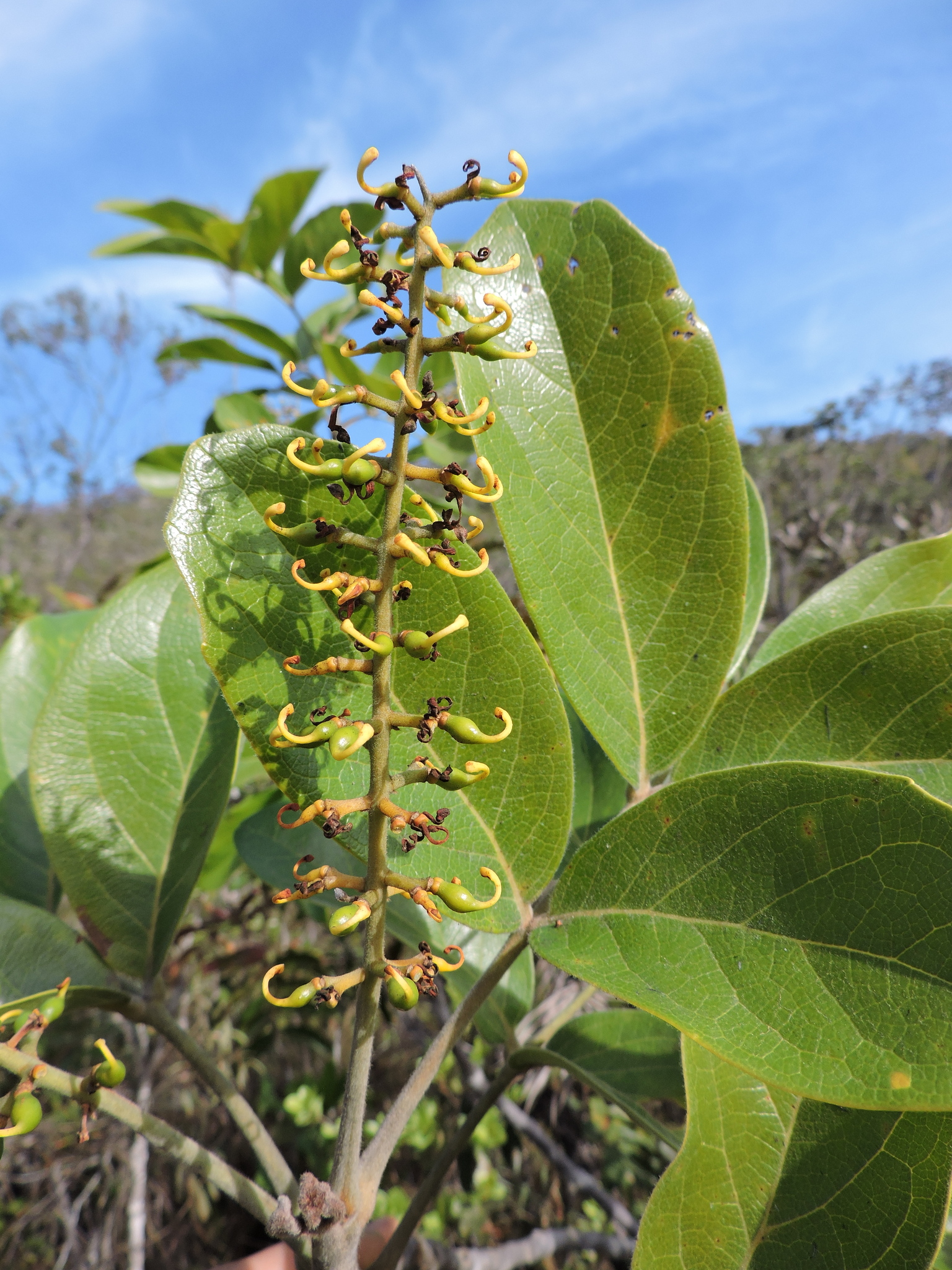
- Euplassa inaequalis

Scientific classification
- Kingdom: Plantae
- Clade: Embryophytes
- Clade: Tracheophytes
- Clade: Spermatophytes
- Clade: Angiosperms
- Clade: Eudicots
- Order: Proteales
- Family: Proteaceae
- Subfamily: Grevilleoideae
- Tribe: Macadamieae
- Subtribe: Gevuininae
- Genus: Euplassa; Salisb. ex Knight

Species
- See text

= Euplassa =

Genus of plants in the protea family

Euplassa is a genus of flowering plants in the protea family. It is native to tropical South America, including Bolivia, Brazil, Colombia, Ecuador, French Guiana, Guyana, Peru, Suriname, and Venezuela.

== Species ==
Species include:

- Euplassa bahiensis (Meisn.) I.M.Johnst.
- Euplassa cantareirae Sleumer
- Euplassa chimantensis Steyerm.
- Euplassa duquei Killip & Cuatrec.
- Euplassa glaziovii (Mez) Steyerm.
- Euplassa hoehnei Sleumer
- Euplassa inaequalis (Pohl) Engl.
- Euplassa incana (Klotzsch) I.M.Johnst.
- Euplassa isernii Cuatrec. ex J.F.Macbr.
- Euplassa itatiaiae Sleumer
- Euplassa legalis (Vell.) I.M.Johnst.
- Euplassa madeirae Sleumer
- Euplassa nebularis Rambo & Sleumer
- Euplassa occidentalis I.M.Johnst.
- Euplassa organensis (Gardner) I.M.Johnst.
- Euplassa pinnata (Lam.) I.M.Johnst.
- Euplassa rufa (Loes.) Sleumer
- Euplassa saxicola (R.E.Schult.) Steyerm.
- Euplassa semicostata Plana
- Euplassa taubertiana K.Schum.
