= Ivan Murray Johnston =

American botanist (1898-1960)

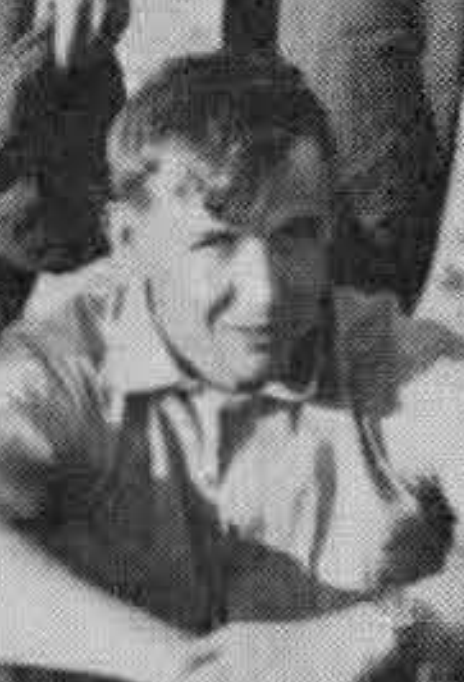
- Johnston in May 1922
- Born: February 28, 1898; Los Angeles, California
- Died: May 31, 1960 (aged 62); Boston, Massachusetts
- Education: Harvard University (PhD); University of California, Berkeley (AB, MA)
- Scientific career
- Fields: Botany
- Workplaces: Harvard University
- Author abbrev. (botany): I.M.Johnst

Ivan Murray Johnston (February 28, 1898 – May 31, 1960) was an American botanist who spent most of his career at Harvard University and the Arnold Arboretum. He collected botanical specimens across the Americas, describing several taxa. Other botanists have named several genera in his honor.

== Life and career ==
Johnston was born in Los Angeles to physician William M. Johnston and Dora Etta (Farnsworth) Johnston. He studied botany at Pomona College and received his AB from University of California at Berkeley in 1920, his MA from Berkeley in 1922, and his PhD from Harvard University in 1925. After graduation, he conducted field work in Chile on a Sheldon Travelling Fellowship from Harvard and received a Guggenheim Fellowship in 1932. He spent most of his career at Harvard University, starting out as an assistant in the Gray Herbarium from 1922 to 1931 and gaining promotions to research associate at the Arnold Arboretum in 1931 and associate professor of botany in 1938. From 1948 to 1953 he also worked as associate director of the Arnold Arboretum. He died suddenly at home in Jamaica Plain, Massachusetts, on May 31, 1960.

Johnston was considered a leading authority on the family Boraginaceae. He collected algae, pteridophytes and spermatophytes and traveled widely to collect specimens in the Andes, Panama, the southwestern United States, and northern Mexico. His plant collections are housed in the California Botanic Garden and the Harvard University Herbaria. He published extensively in Fieldiana, Journal of the Arnold Arboretum, Revista Chilena de Historia Natural, and other scientific journals.

== Honors ==
In 1925, German botanist August Brand named a genus of flowering plants (belonging to the family Boraginaceae) from South America and the southern United States, as Johnstonella in Johnston's honour. Then in 1933, German botanist Otto Eugen Schulz named a genus of flowering plants (belonging to the family Brassicaceae) from Chile as Ivania. In 1936, Chinese botanist Hsen Hsu Hu published Sinojohnstonia, which is a genus of flowering plants from China, belonging to the family Boraginaceae. In 1975, Somali-Pakistani botanist Syed Muhammad Anwar Kazmi named a monotypic genus of flowering plants (belonging to the family Boraginaceae), from the Western Himalayas as Ivanjohnstonia in his honour.

Johnston was a member of the American Academy of Arts and Sciences, the American Society of Plant Taxonomists, the Botanical Society of America, the American Society of Naturalists, the American Association for the Advancement of Science, the New England Botanical Society, and Sigma Xi. He was a corresponding member of the National Academies of Sciences of Argentina and Chile.

== Taxa named by Johnston ==
Some taxa named by Johnston include the following.

- Fitzroya cupressoides
- Leucophyllum frutescens
- Astragalus sprucei
- Euplassa
- Euplassa occidentalis
- Fuchsia hypoleuca
- Brunnera macrophylla
