= List of Ericaceae genera =

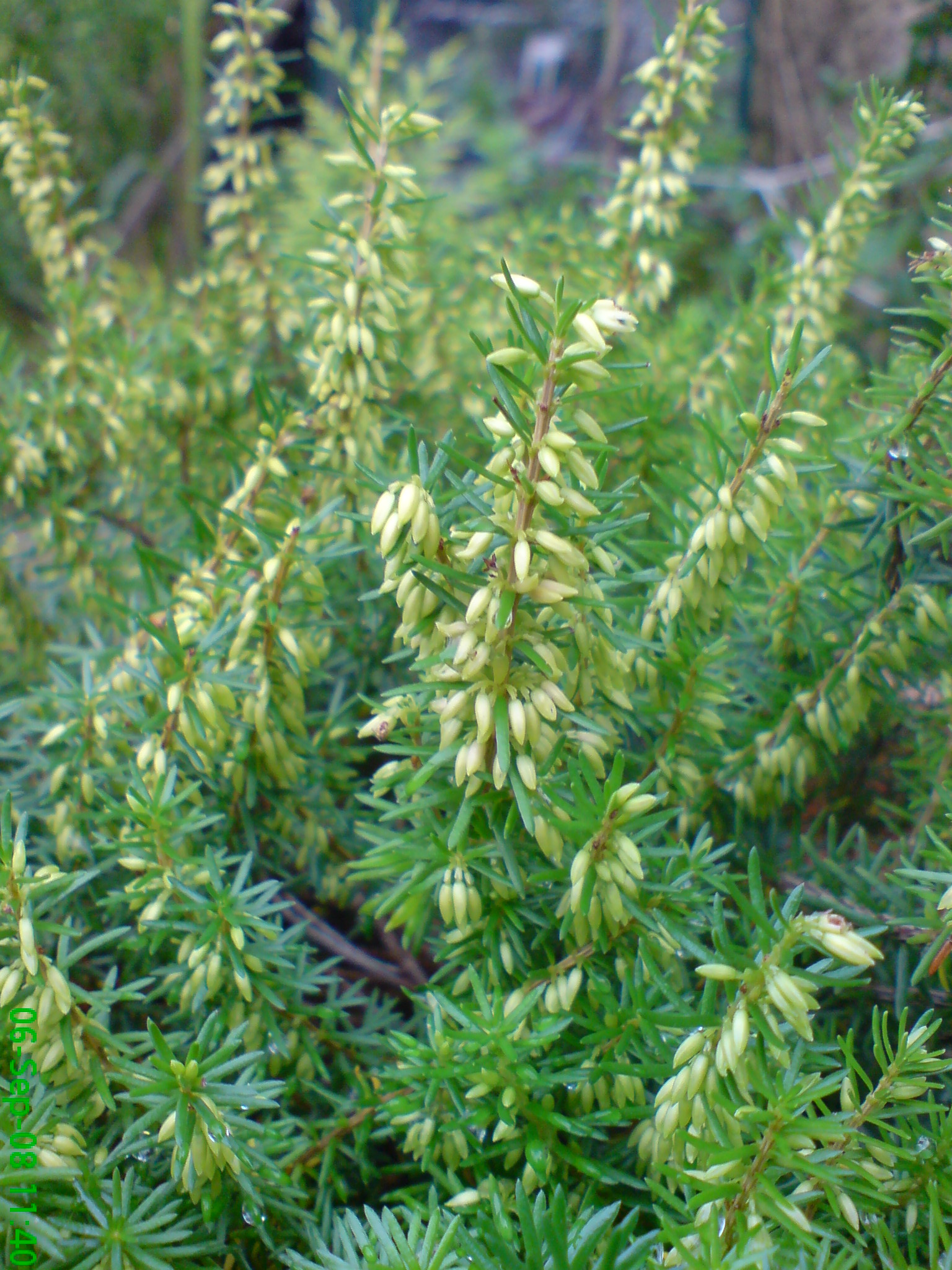
Bell heather, Erica cinerea, is the type species of the family.

This is a list of genera in the plant family Ericaceae, which includes the heaths, heathers, epacrids, and blueberries. As currently circumscribed, the family contains about 4000 species into more than 120 genera classified into 9 subfamilies.

== Current understanding ==
The list shown here follows the phylogenetic classification of Kron et al. (2002), with modifications as per Stevens et al. (2004), Quinn et al. (2005), Albrecht et al. (2010), Gillespie & Kron (2010), and Craven (2011).

Nonetheless, much of the taxonomy within the Vaccinioideae is in flux. Multiple studies of the Gaultherieae have now shown Pernettya, Diplycosia (already including Pernettyopsis), and Tepuia to be nested within Gaultheria, although publication formalizing the transfers are yet to be published. Similarly, most of Vaccinieae has not been investigated using molecular techniques, and many genera are likely paraphyletic or polyphyletic. Neotropical and Old World Vaccinioideae are particularly poorly known.

Relevant recent synonymy include Bruckenthalia with Erica, Leiophyllum and Loiseleuria with Kalmia, and Diplarche and Menziesia with Rhododendron.

== Genera ==
121 genera are currently accepted.

Genus Authority	Year	Subfamily / Tribe	Type species	# of species	Distribution
Enkianthus Lour.	1791	Enkianthoideae	Enkianthus quinqueflorus Lour.	16	Southeast Asia
Chimaphila Pursh	1813 ("1814")	Pyroloideae	Chimaphila maculata (L.) Pursh	5	North and Central America, Eurasia
Moneses Salisb. ex S.F.Gray	1821	Pyroloideae	Moneses grandiflora (Note: As unnecessary renamings of species described earlier by Carl Linnaeus, these names are illegitimate and treated respectively as Moneses uniflora (L.) A.Gray, Orthilia secunda (L.) House, and Phyllodoce caerulea (L.) Bab.) Salisb. ex S.F.Gray	1	Circumboreal
Orthilia Raf.	1840	Pyroloideae	Orthilia parvifolia Raf.	1	Canada to Guatemala, Eurasia
Pyrola L.	1753	Pyroloideae	Pyrola rotundifolia L.	ca. 30	North and Central America, Eurasia
Allotropa Torr. & A.Gray	1858 ("1857")	Monotropoideae / Monotropeae	Allotropa virgata Torr. & A.Gray	1	Pacific Northwest
Cheilotheca Hook.f.	1876	Monotropoideae / Monotropeae	Cheilotheca khasiana Hook.f.	4	eastern India, southeastern China, Peninsular Malaysia, and Sumatra
Eremotropa Andres	1953	Monotropoideae	Eremotropa sciaphila Andres	1	south-central China
Hemitomes A.Gray	1858 ("1857")	Monotropoideae / Monotropeae	Hemitomes congestum A.Gray	1	West Coast
Monotropa L.	1753	Monotropoideae / Monotropeae	Monotropa uniflora L.	2	America, Europe, Asia
Monotropastrum H.Andres	1936	Monotropoideae / Monotropeae	Monotropastrum macrocarpum H.Andres	2 or 3	Himalaya to Sumatra and Japan
Monotropsis Schwein.	1817	Monotropoideae / Monotropeae	Monotropsis odorata Schwein.	1	Southeastern United States
Pityopus Small	1914	Monotropoideae / Monotropeae	Pityopus oregonus (Note: Small's species, which he originally named Pityopus oregona, was later found to be the same as Alice Eastwood's Monotropa californica. It is now treated as Pityopus californius (Eastw.) H.F.Copel.) Small	1	West Coast of the United States
Pleuricospora A.Gray	1868	Monotropoideae / Monotropeae	Pleuricospora fimbriolata A.Gray	1	California to British Columbia
Pterospora Nutt.	1919	Monotropoideae / Pterosporeae	Pterospora andromedea Nutt.	1	United States and Mexico
Sarcodes Torr.	1851	Monotropoideae / Pterosporeae	Sarcodes sanguinea Torr.	1	West Coast of United States and Mexico
Arbutus L.	1753	Arbutoideae	Arbutus unedo L.	10	West Coast of Canada to Central America, Mediterranean area
Arctostaphylos Adans.	1763	Arbutoideae	Arctostaphylos uva-ursi (L.) Spreng.	66	North and Central America, Eurasia
Arctous Nied.	1889	Arbutoideae	Arctous alpina (L.) Nied.	3	subarctic and subalpine Eurasia and North America
Comarostaphylis Zucc.	1837	Arbutoideae	Comarostaphylis arguta (Note: Currently treated as a synonym of Comarostaphylis discolor (Hook.) Diggs.) Zucc.	10	California to Central America
Ornithostaphylos Small	1914	Arbutoideae	Ornithostaphylos oppositifolia (Parry) Small	1	California, Mexico
Xylococcus Nutt.	1842 ("1843")	Arbutoideae	Xylococcus bicolor Nutt.	1	California
Cassiope D.Don	1834	Cassiopeoideae	Cassiope tetragona (L.) D.Don	18	Circumboreal
Bryanthus S.G.Gmel. (Note: The name is often attributed to David Don. Although no valid species name were published in the two last volumes of Gmelin's work (which did not use the Linnean binomial system), his genera are considered valid.)	1769	Ericoideae / Bryantheae	Bryanthus musciformis (Poir.) Nakai	1	Kamchatka, Kuril Islands, and Japan
Ledothamnus Meisn.	1863	Ericoideae / Bryantheae	Ledothamnus guyanensis Meisn.	7	Guyana, Venezuela, and northern Brazil
Ceratiola Michx.	1803	Ericoideae / Empetreae	Ceratiola ericoides Michx.	1	United States
Corema D.Don	1826	Ericoideae / Empetreae	Corema album (L.) D.Don ex Steud.	2	North America, Iberian Peninsula
Empetrum L.	1753	Ericoideae / Empetreae	Empetrum nigrum L.	3–18 (Note: Murray et al. (2009) note that there are no recent comprehensive reviews of this genus "where different authors rarely, if ever, arrive at the same conclusion." (Hultén, 1971))	Circumboreal and southern South America
Calluna Salisb.	1802	Ericoideae / Ericeae	Calluna vulgaris (L.) Hull	1	European
Daboecia D.Don	1834	Ericoideae / Ericeae	Daboecia polifolia (Note: The correct name of the species is Daboecia cantabrica (Huds.) K.Koch) D.Don	2	Europe
Erica L.	1753	Ericoideae / Ericeae	Erica cinerea L.	850+	Afro-Eurasia
Bejaria (Note: As Befaria. The corrected spelling was later conserved.) Mutis	1771	Ericoideae / Phyllodoceae	Bejaria aestuans Mutis ex L.	15	South America to United States
Elliottia Muhl. ex Elliott	1817	Ericoideae / Phyllodoceae	Elliottia racemosa Muhl. ex Elliott	4	North America, Japan
Epigaea L.	1753	Ericoideae / Phyllodoceae	Epigaea repens L.	3	North America, Asia
Kalmia L.	1753	Ericoideae / Phyllodoceae	Kalmia latifolia L.	10	Northern hemisphere
Kalmiopsis Rehder	1932	Ericoideae / Phyllodoceae	Kalmiopsis leachiana (L.F.Hend.) Rehder	2	Oregon
Phyllodoce Salisb.	1806	Ericoideae / Phyllodoceae	Phyllodoce taxifolia (Pall.) Salisb.	8	North America, Eurasia
Rhodothamnus Rchb.	1827	Ericoideae / Phyllodoceae	Rhodothamnus chamaecistus (L.) Rchb.	2	Central Europe and Turkey
Rhododendron L.	1753	Ericoideae / Rhodoreae	Rhododendron ferrugineum L.	1000+	North America, Eurasia, Australia
Harrimanella Coville	1901	Harrimanelloideae	Harrimanella stelleriana (Pall.) Coville	2	Circumboreal
Archeria Hook.f.	1857	Epacridoideae / Archerieae	None designated	6	Tasmania, New Zealand
Andersonia R.Br.	1810	Epacridoideae / Cosmelieae	None designated	ca. 50	Western Australia
Cosmelia R.Br.	1810	Epacridoideae / Cosmelieae	Cosmelia rubra R.Br.	2	Western Australia
Sprengelia Sm.	1794	Epacridoideae / Cosmelieae	Sprengelia incarnata	4	Australia
Epacris Cav.	1797	Epacridoideae / Epacrideae	Epacris longiflora Cav.	30+	Oceania
Lysinema R.Br.	1810	Epacridoideae / Epacrideae	None designated	6	Australia
Woollsia F.Muell.	1873	Epacridoideae / Epacrideae	Woollsia pungens (Cav.) F.Muell.	1	Australia
Dielsiodoxa Albr.	2010	Epacridoideae / Oligarrheneae	Dielsiodoxa tamariscina (F.Muell.) Albr.	5	Australia
Needhamiella (Note: Robert Brown's original Needhamia could not be used because Needhamia Scop., a rejected synonym of Tephrosia (Fabaceae) antedates it.) L.Watson	1965	Epacridoideae / Oligarrheneae	Needhamiella pumilio (R.Br.) L.Watson	1	Western Australia
Oligarrhena R.Br.	1810	Epacridoideae / Oligarrheneae	Oligarrhena micrantha R.Br.	1	Australia
Lebetanthus (Note: Endlicher substituted this name (as "Lebethanthus") for his own Allodape, which he considered preoccupied by Allodape Lepeletier & Serville 1825, a genus of bees. Since homonymy with zoological name is irrelevant under the ICN (Art. 54.1), preserving the usage of the later name (with corrected spelling) required its conservation.) Endl.	1841	Epacridoideae / Prionoteae	Lebetanthus americana (Note: Now included within Lebetanthus myrsinites (Lam.) Dusén.) (Hook.f.) Hook.f.	1	South America
Prionotes R.Br.	1810	Epacridoideae / Prionoteae	Prionotes cerinthoides (Labill. R.Br.)	1	Tasmania
Dracophyllum Labill.	1800	Epacridoideae / Richeeae	Dracophyllum verticillatum Labill.	ca. 100	Oceania
Richea (Note: Sometimes misattributed to Labillardière, but that name is a rejected name against Brown's, and a synonym of Craspedia (Asteraceae:Gnaphalieae).) R.Br.	1810	Epacridoideae / Richeeae	Richea dracophylla R.Br.	11	Australia, Tasmania
Sphenotoma (R.Br.) Sweet (Note: Not "R.Br. ex Sweet" or just "Sweet". Brown's Dracophyllum [unranked] Sphenotoma had no rank attached. Although such names cannot affect priority, they can still serve as basionyms so long as they are validly published (ICBN, art. 35).)	1828	Epacridoideae / Richeeae	Sphenotoma gracilis (R.Br.) Sweet	6	
Acrothamnus Quinn	2005	Epacridoideae / Styphelieae	Acrothamnus maccraei (F.Muell.) Quinn	5+	Oceania
Acrotriche R.Br.	1810	Epacridoideae / Styphelieae	Acrotriche divaricata (Note: Not recorded in ING (Index Nominum Genericorum), but see Paterson (1960)) R.Br.	16	Australia
Agiortia Quinn	2005	Epacridoideae / Styphelieae	Agiortia cicatricata (J.M.Powell) Quinn	3	Australia
Androstoma Hook.f.	1844	Epacridoideae / Styphelieae	Androstoma empetrifolia Hook.f.	2	Australia, New Zealand
Astroloma R.Br.	1810	Epacridoideae / Styphelieae	none designated	ca. 10	Australia
Brachyloma Sond.	1845	Epacridoideae / Styphelieae	Brachyloma preissii Sond.	7	Australia
Coleanthera Stschegl.	1859	Epacridoideae / Styphelieae	Coleanthera myrtoides	3	Australia
Conostephium Benth.	1837	Epacridoideae / Styphelieae	Conostephium pendulum Benth.	ca. 10	Australia
Cyathodes Labill.	1805 (1804)	Epacridoideae / Styphelieae	Cyathodes glauca (Note: Not recorded in ING, but see Weiller (1996)) Labill.	5(?)	Australia
Cyathopsis Brongn. & Gris (Note: ING and IPNI cite both journals but the issue of the Bulletin was not published before late January 1865.)	1864	Epacridoideae / Styphelieae	Cyathopsis floribunda Brongn. & Gris	3	New Caledonia
Decatoca F.Muell.	1889	Epacridoideae / Styphelieae	Decatoca spencerii	1	New Guinea
Leptecophylla C.M.Weiller	1999	Epacridoideae / Styphelieae	Leptecophylla juniperina (J.R.Forst. & G.Forst.) C.M.Weiller	12	Oceania
Leucopogon R.Br.	1810	Epacridoideae / Styphelieae	Leucopogon lanceolatus (Note: An illegitimate renaming of Henry Cranke Andrews Styphelia parviflora. The correct name is Leucopogon parviflorus (Andrews) Lindl.)	150+	Oceania
Lissanthe R.Br.	1810	Epacridoideae / Styphelieae	Lissanthe strigosa (Note: Not recorded in APNI or ING, but see Crayn et al. (2003)) (Sm.) R.Br.	7	Australia
Melichrus R.Br.	1810	Epacridoideae / Styphelieae	Melichrus procumbens (Cav.) Druce	ca. 10	Australia
Monotoca R.Br.	1810	Epacridoideae / Styphelieae	Monotoca scoparia (Sm.) R.Br.	17	Australia
Montitega C.M.Weiller	1993	Epacridoideae / Styphelieae	Montitega dealbata (R.Br.) C.M.Weiller	1	Australia
Pentachondra R.Br.	1810	Epacridoideae / Styphelieae	None designated (Note: This would have to be either Pentachondra involucrata or Pentachondra pumilla.)	4–5	Australia, New Zealand
Planocarpa C.M.Weiller	1996	Epacridoideae / Styphelieae	Planocarpa petiolaris (DC.) C.M.Weiller	3	Tasmania
Stenanthera R.Br.	1810	Epacridoideae / Styphelieae	Stenanthera pinifolia R.Br.	4	southeastern and southwestern Australia
Styphelia Sm.	1795 ("1793")	Epacridoideae / Styphelieae	Styphelia tubuliflora Sm.	189	Oceania
Trochocarpa R.Br.	1810	Epacridoideae / Styphelieae	Trochocarpa laurina (Rudge R.Br.)	15	Australia, New Guinea, and Malesia
Andromeda L.	1753	Vaccinioideae / Andromedeae	Andromeda polifolia L.	1 or 2	Circumboreal
Zenobia D.Don	1834	Vaccinioideae / Andromedeae	Zenobia speciosa (Note: The genus' sole species is now known as Zenobia pulverulanta (W.Bartram ex Willd.) Pollard) (Michx.) D.Don	1	Southeastern United States
Chamaedaphne Moench	1794	Vaccinioideae / Gaultherieae	Chamaedaphne calyculata (L.) Moench	1	Circumboreal
Diplycosia Blume	1826	Vaccinioideae / Gaultherieae	None designated (Note: This would be either Diplycosia pilosa, D. heterophylla or D. latifolia (≡D. heterophylla var. latifolia).)	ca. 110	Southeast Asia
Eubotryoides (Nakai) H.Hara	1935	Vaccinioideae / Gaultherieae	Eubotryoides grayana (Maxim.) H.Hara	1	Japan and Kuril Islands
Eubotrys Nutt.	1842 ("1843")	Vaccinioideae / Gaultherieae	Eubotrys racemosa (L.) Nutt.	2	Eastern United States
Gaultheria L.	1753	Vaccinioideae / Gaultherieae	Gaultheria procumbens L.	ca. 115	Circumpacific, Americas
Leucothoe D.Don	1834	Vaccinioideae / Gaultherieae	Leucothoe axillaria (Lam.) D.Don	5	United States, East Asia
Pernettya (Note: Gaudichaud originally spelled the name, which honors Antoine-Joseph Pernety, as "Pernettia". The spelling was later conserved with "y".) Gaudich.	1825	Vaccinioideae / Gaultherieae	Pernettya empetrifolia (Note: The correct name in Pernettya is Pernettya pumila (L.f.) Hook. Although the species is known to belong in Gaultheria, it currently lacks a name in that genus (Gaultheria pumila Hook. already exists).) (Lam.) Gaudich.		Southern America, Oceania
Agarista D.Don ex G.Don	1834	Vaccinioideae / Lyonieae	Agarista nummularia (Cham. & Schltdl.) G.Don	ca. 30	Americas, Africa, Madagascar
Craibiodendron W.W.Sm.	1911	Vaccinioideae / Lyonieae	Craibiodendron shanicum (Note: Currently treated as a synonym of Craibiodendron stellatum (Pierre) W.W.Sm.) W.W.Sm.	5	India, China, Indochina
Lyonia Nutt.	1919	Vaccinioideae / Lyonieae	Lyonia ferruginea (Walter) Nutt.	35	United States to Mexico and Caribbeans, East Asia
Pieris D.Don	1834	Vaccinioideae / Lyonieae	Pieris formosa (Wall.) D.Don	7	United States, Cuba, East Asia
Oxydendrum DC.	1839	Vaccinioideae / Oxydendreae	Oxydendrum arboreum (L.) DC.	1	United States
Agapetes D.Don ex G.Don	1834	Vaccinioideae / Vaccinieae	Agapetes setigera (Wall.) D.Don ex G.Don	80+	Himalaya
Anthopteropsis A.C.Sm.	1941	Vaccinioideae / Vaccinieae	Anthopteropsis insignis A.C.Sm.	1	Panama
Anthopterus Hook.	1839	Vaccinioideae / Vaccinieae	Anthopterus racemosus Hook.	ca. 20	Neotropical
Cavendishia Lindl.	1835 ("1836")	Vaccinioideae / Vaccinieae	Cavendishia nobilis Lindl.	ca. 100	Neotropical
Ceratostema Juss.	1789	Vaccinioideae / Vaccinieae	Ceratostema peruvianum J.F.Gmel.	35	Andes
Costera J.J.Sm.	1910	Vaccinioideae / Vaccinieae	Costera ovalifolia J.J.Sm.	10	Malesia
Demosthenesia A.C.Sm.	1936	Vaccinioideae / Vaccinieae	Demosthenesia mandonii (Britton) A.C.Sm.	12	Neotropical
Didonica Luteyn & Wilbur	1977	Vaccinioideae / Vaccinieae	Didonica pendula Luteyn & Wilbur	4	Neotropical
Dimorphanthera (Drude) F.Muell.	1890	Vaccinioideae / Vaccinieae	None designated	79	Philippines to New Guinea
Diogenesia Sleumer	1934	Vaccinioideae / Vaccinieae	Diogenesia octandra Sleumer	13	Eastern Venezuela, Northern Andes
Disterigma (Klotzsch) Nied.	1889 ("1890")	Vaccinioideae / Vaccinieae	Disterigma empetrifolium (Kunth) Drude	ca. 40	Mexico to Northern South America
Gaylussacia Kunth	1819	Vaccinioideae / Vaccinieae	Gaylussacia buxifolia Kunth	50	Americas
Gonocalyx Planch. & Linden	1856	Vaccinioideae / Vaccinieae	Gonocalyx pulcher Planch. & Linden	11	Southern America
Lateropora A.C.Sm.	1932 (Note: A printing error misstates the year as "1942".)	Vaccinioideae / Vaccinieae	Lateropora ovata A.C.Sm.	3	
Macleania Hook.	1837	Vaccinioideae / Vaccinieae	Macleania floribunda Hook.	ca. 50	Southern Mexico to Peru
Mycerinus A.C.Sm.	1931	Vaccinioideae / Vaccinieae	Mycerinus sclerophyllus A.C.Sm.	3	Southern America
Notopora Hook.f.	1873	Vaccinioideae / Vaccinieae	Notopora schomburgkii (Note: Hooker also listed the species with the epithet "schomburgkiana".) Hook.f.	5	
Oreanthes Benth.	1844	Vaccinioideae / Vaccinieae	Oreanthes buxifolius Benth.	7	Neotropical
Orthaea Klotzsch	1851	Vaccinioideae / Vaccinieae	Orthaea secundiflora (Poepp. & Endl.) Klotzsch	34	Neotropical
Paphia Seem.	1864	Vaccinioideae / Vaccinieae	Paphia vitiensis Seem.	20+	Australasia
Pellegrinia Sleumer	1935	Vaccinioideae / Vaccinieae	Pellegrinia grandiflora (Ruiz & Pav. ex G.Don) Sleumer	6	
Periclesia A.C.Sm.	1935	Vaccinioideae / Vaccinieae	Periclesia flexuosa A.C.Sm.	1	Ecuador
Plutarchia A.C.Sm.	1936	Vaccinioideae / Vaccinieae	Plutarchia rigida (Benth.) A.C.Sm.	11	Ecuador, Colombia
Polyclita A.C.Sm.	1936	Vaccinioideae / Vaccinieae	Polyclita turbinata (Kuntze) A.C.Sm.	1	
Psammisia Klotzsch	1851	Vaccinioideae / Vaccinieae	Psammisia falcata Klotzsch	70	Neotropical
Rigiolepis Hook.f.	1873	Vaccinioideae / Vaccinieae	Rigiolepis borneensis Hook.f.	27	Malesia
Rusbya Britton	1893	Vaccinioideae / Vaccinieae	None designated (Note: This would have to be Rusbya taxifolia, as the other of Britton's original species is currently treated as Demosthenesia pearcei (Britton) A.C.Sm. and its designation as lectotype would replace Demosthenesia with Rusbya.)	1	Bolivia
Satyria Klotzsch	1851	Vaccinioideae / Vaccinieae	Satyria warszewiczii Klotzsch		
Semiramisia Klotzsch	1851	Vaccinioideae / Vaccinieae	Semiramisia speciosa (Benth.) Klotzsch	4	Ecuador, Venezuela to Peru
Siphonandra (Note: Because the name is preceded by Siphonandra Turcz., it has been proposed for conservation.) Klotzsch	1851	Vaccinioideae / Vaccinieae	Siphonandra elliptica (Ruiz & Pav. ex G.Don) Klotzsch	3	Neotropical
Sphyrospermum Poepp. & Endl.	1835	Vaccinioideae / Vaccinieae	Sphyrospermum buxifolium Poepp. & Endl.	22	Neotropical
Themistoclesia Klotzsch	1851	Vaccinioideae / Vaccinieae	Themistoclesia pendula (Note: A synonym for Themistoclesia dependens (Benth.) A.C.Sm.)	22	Costa Rica to Peru
Thibaudia Ruiz & Pav. ex J.St.-Hil. (Note: The fourth and fifth volumes of Ruiz and Pavón's Flora Peruviana, et Chilensis were not published during their time, but the plates that were to illustrate volume 4 were circulated and lead to the publication of some names.)	1805	Vaccinioideae / Vaccinieae	Thibaudia mellifera (Note: It is not clear whether the correct spelling is "mellifera" or "melliflora".) Ruiz & Pav. ex J.St.-Hil.	60	Neotropical
Utleya Wilbur & Luteyn	1977	Vaccinioideae / Vaccinieae	Utleya costaricensis Wilbur & Luteyn	1	
Vaccinium L.	1753	Vaccinioideae / Vaccinieae	Vaccinium uliginosum L.	500+	Near cosmopolitan
