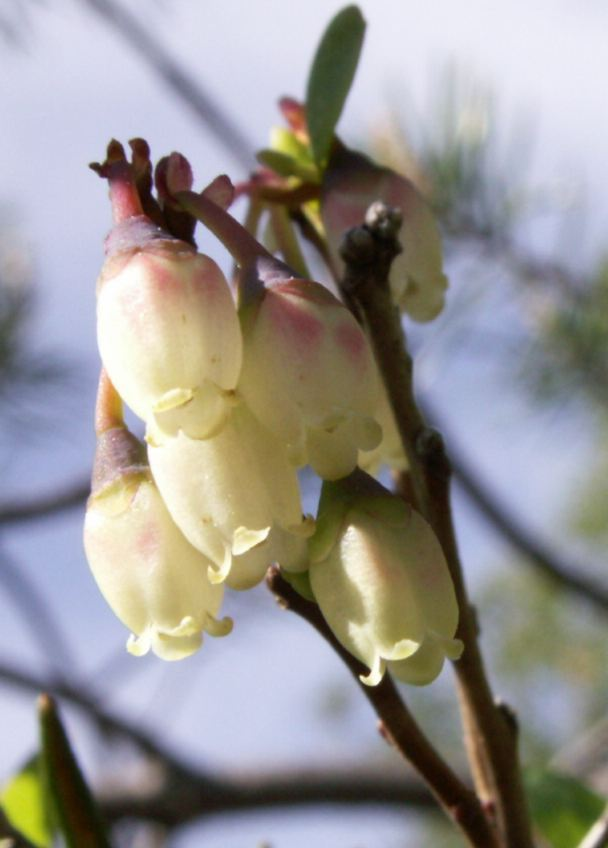
- Vaccinium uliginosum

Scientific classification
- Kingdom: Plantae
- Clade: Tracheophytes
- Clade: Angiosperms
- Clade: Eudicots
- Clade: Asterids
- Order: Ericales
- Family: Ericaceae
- Subfamily: Vaccinioideae
- Tribe: Vaccinieae; Rchb.

Type genus
- Vaccinium L.

Genera
- See here

= Vaccinieae =

Tribe of flowering plants

Vaccinieae is a tribe of over 1000 species in the plant family Ericaceae. The tribe consists of morphologically diverse woody plants. Species within Vaccinieae can be found on all continents except Australia and Antarctica.

== Description ==
Vaccinieae are shrubs, small trees, or lianas with deciduous or evergreen leaves.

== Taxonomy ==
It was published by Heinrich Gottlieb Ludwig Reichenbach in 1831 with Vaccinium L. as the type genus.

=== Genera ===
- Agapetes D.Don ex G.Don
- Anthopteropsis A.C.Sm.
- Anthopterus Hook.
- Calopteryx A.C.Sm.
- Cavendishia Lindl.
- Ceratostema Juss.
- Costera J.J.Sm.
- Demosthenesia A.C.Sm.
- Didonica Luteyn & Wilbur
- Dimorphanthera (Drude) F.Muell.
- Diogenesia Sleumer
- Disterigma (Klotzsch) Nied.
- Gaylussacia Kunth
- Gonocalyx Planch. & Linden
- Lateropora A.C.Sm.
- Macleania Hook.
- Mycerinus A.C.Sm.
- Notopora Hook.f.
- Oreanthes Benth.
- Orthaea Klotzsch
- Paphia Seem.
- Pellegrinia Sleumer
- Periclesia A.C.Sm.
- Plutarchia A.C.Sm.
- Polyclita A.C.Sm.
- Psammisia Klotzsch
- Rusbya Britton
- Satyria Klotzsch
- Semiramisia Klotzsch
- Siphonandra Klotzsch
- Sphyrospermum Poepp. & Endl.
- Themistoclesia Klotzsch
- Thibaudia Ruiz & Pav. ex J.St.-Hil.
- Utleya Wilbur & Luteyn
- Vaccinium L.
