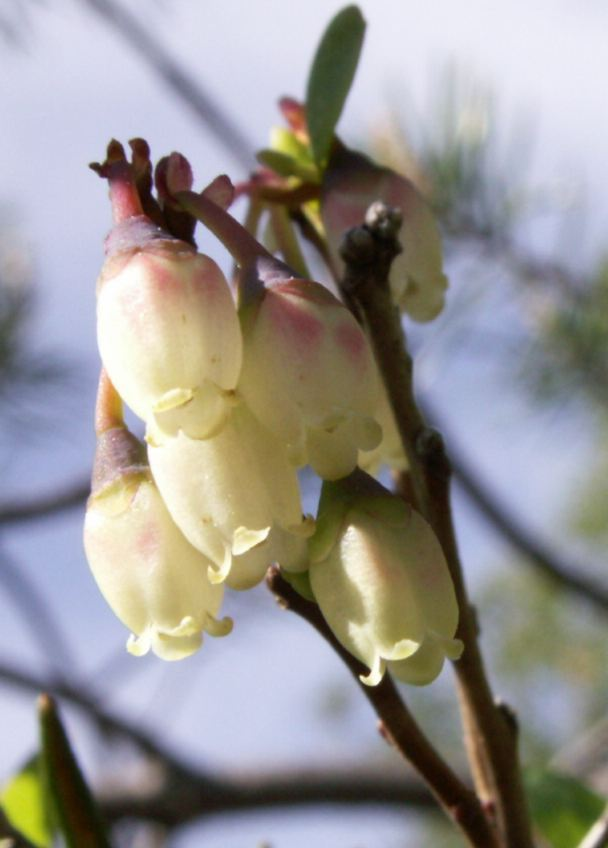
- Vaccinium uliginosum

Scientific classification
- Kingdom: Plantae
- Clade: Tracheophytes
- Clade: Angiosperms
- Clade: Eudicots
- Clade: Asterids
- Order: Ericales
- Family: Ericaceae
- Subfamily: Vaccinioideae; Arn.

Tribes
- Andromedeae; Gaultherieae; Lyonieae; Oxydendreae; Vaccinieae

= Vaccinioideae =

Subfamily of flowering plants in the heather family

Vaccinioideae is a flowering-plant subfamily in the family Ericaceae. It contains the commercially important cranberry, blueberry, bilberry, lingonberry, and huckleberry.

== Taxonomy ==
- Tribe: Andromedeae
  - Genera: Andromeda - Zenobia
- Tribe: Gaultherieae
  - Genera: Chamaedaphne - Eubotrys - Gaultheria incl. Diplycosia & Tepuia - Leucothoe
- Tribe: Lyonieae
  - Genera: Agarista - Craibiodendron - Lyonia - Pieris
- Tribe: Oxydendreae
  - Genera: Oxydendrum
- Tribe: Vaccinieae
  - Genera: Agapetes - Anthopteropsis - Anthopterus - Cavendishia - Ceratostema - Costera - Demosthenesia - Didonica - Dimorphanthera - Diogenesia - Disterigma - Gaylussacia - Gonocalyx - Macleania - Mycerinus - Notopora - Oreanthes - Orthaea - Pellegrinia - Periclesia - Plutarchia - Polyclita - Psammisia - Rusbya - Satyria - Semiramisia - Siphonandra - Sphyrospermum -Themistoclesia - Thibaudia - Utleya - Vaccinium
