= Costera =

Costera may refer to:

- Costera (comarca), a comarca in Valencia, Spain
- Costera (plant), a genus of plants in the Ericaceae
