= Rigiolepis =

Scientific classification
- Kingdom: Plantae
- Clade: Tracheophytes
- Clade: Angiosperms
- Clade: Eudicots
- Clade: Asterids
- Order: Ericales
- Family: Ericaceae
- Tribe: Vaccinieae
- Genus: Rigiolepis; Hook.f.

Genus of flowering plants

Rigiolepis is a genus of flowering plants belonging to the family Ericaceae. Its native range is Malesia.

== Species ==
27 species are accepted.

- Rigiolepis adenopoda (Sleumer) Argent
- Rigiolepis andersonii (Sleumer) Argent
- Rigiolepis argentii Mustaqim & Ardi
- Rigiolepis balgooyi Argent
- Rigiolepis bigibba (J.J.Sm.) J.J.Sm.
- Rigiolepis borneensis Hook.f.
- Rigiolepis chaii Argent
- Rigiolepis gayoensis Mustaqim, M.N.Tamayo & P.W.Fritsch
- Rigiolepis henrici (Sleumer) Argent
- Rigiolepis irawatiae Argent
- Rigiolepis jermyi Argent
- Rigiolepis lanceolata (Blume) J.J.Sm.
- Rigiolepis leptantha (Miq.) J.J.Sm.
- Rigiolepis linearifolia (Kloet) Argent
- Rigiolepis lobbii Ridl.
- Rigiolepis macrophylla J.J.Sm.
- Rigiolepis minimiflora (Sleumer) Argent
- Rigiolepis moultonii (Merr.) J.J.Sm.
- Rigiolepis piperifolia (Sleumer) Argent
- Rigiolepis poiana J.J.Sm.
- Rigiolepis salicifolia J.J.Sm.
- Rigiolepis suberosa (Kloet) Argent
- Rigiolepis sulcata (Ridl.) J.J.Sm.
- Rigiolepis tenax (Argent) Argent
- Rigiolepis uniflora (J.J.Sm.) J.J.Sm.
- Rigiolepis uroglossa (Sleumer) Argent
- Rigiolepis winkleri Argent
