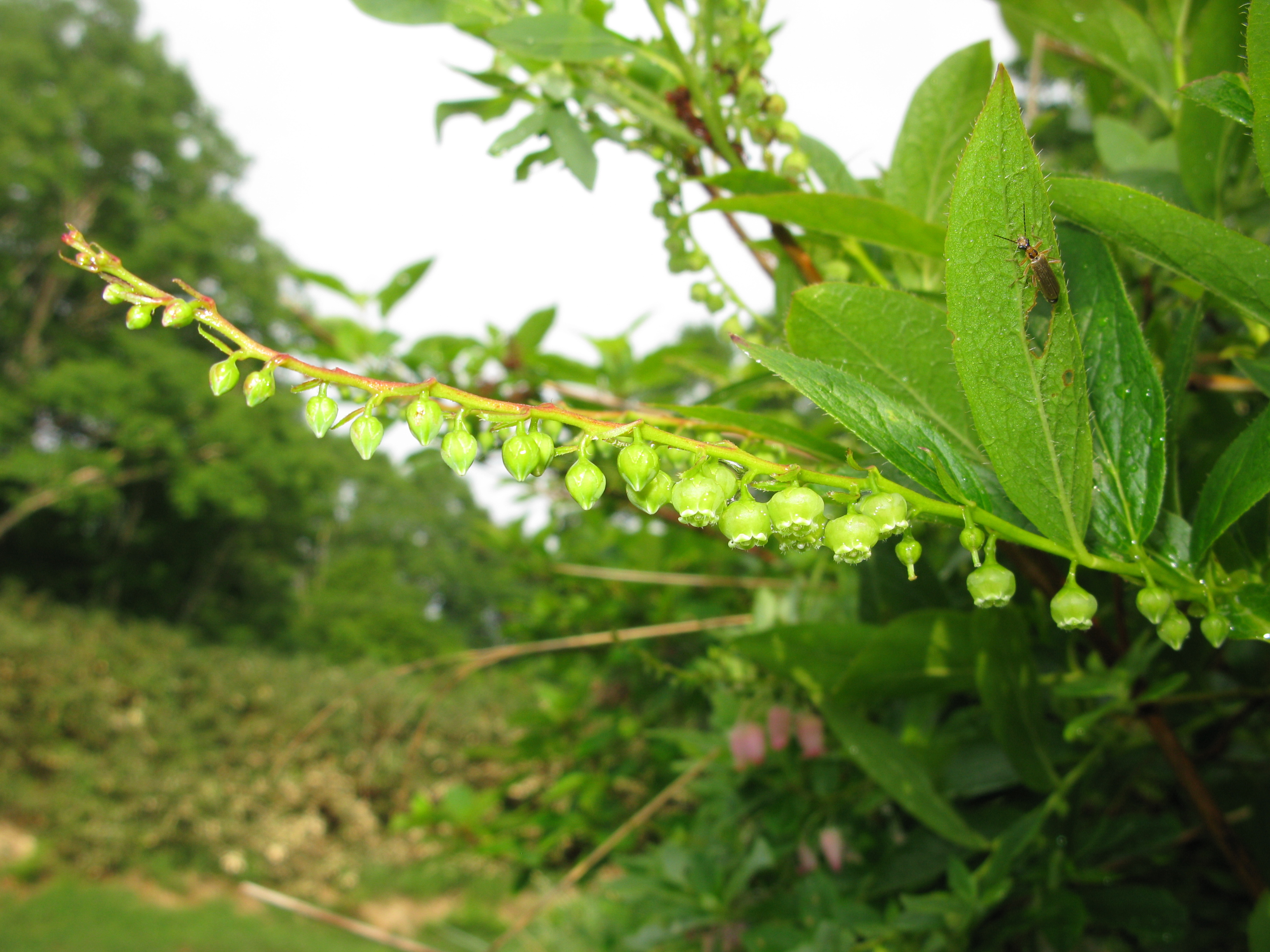
- Inflorescence
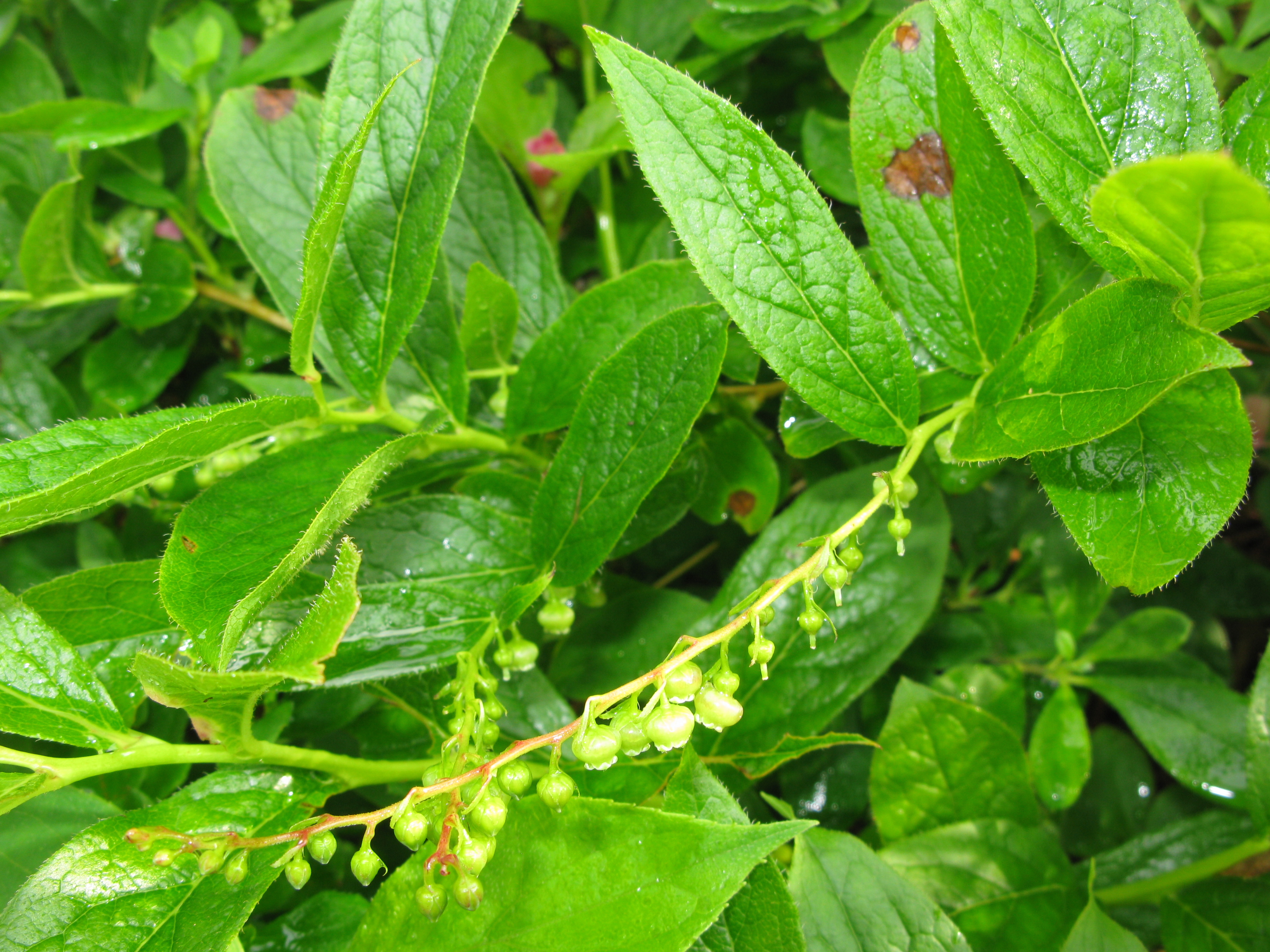
- Foliage

Scientific classification
- Kingdom: Plantae
- Clade: Tracheophytes
- Clade: Angiosperms
- Clade: Eudicots
- Clade: Asterids
- Order: Ericales
- Family: Ericaceae
- Genus: Eubotryoides
- Species: E. grayana

Binomial name
- Eubotryoides grayana (Maxim.) H.Hara

Synonyms
- List: Eubotryoides grayana var. glabra (Komatsu) H.Hara; Eubotryoides grayana var. glaucina (Koidz. ex Komatsu) H.Hara; Eubotryoides grayana f. hypoleuca (Nakai) H.Hara; Eubotryoides grayana var. iwanoi Ajima & Satomi; Eubotryoides grayana f. lasiocarpa H.Hara; Eubotryoides grayana f. leiocarpa H.Hara; Eubotryoides grayana f. lissocarpa H.Hara; Eubotryoides grayana var. oblongifolia (Miq.) H.Hara; Eubotryoides grayana var. parvifolia H.Hara; Eubotryoides grayana var. pruinosa H.Hara; Eubotryoides grayana f. psilocarpa H.Hara; Eubotryoides grayana f. tschonoskii (Maxim.) H.Hara; Eubotryoides grayana var. venosa (Nakai) H.Hara; Eubotryoides grayana var. yezoensis (Tatew.) H.Hara; Eubotryoides tschonoskii (Maxim.) Pojark.; Leucothoe chlorantha A.Gray; Leucothoe chlorantha var. oblongifolia Miq.; Leucothoe glaucina Koidz. ex Komatsu; Leucothoe grayana Maxim.; Leucothoe grayana var. glabra Komatsu; Leucothoe grayana var. glaucina Koidz. ex Nakai; Leucothoe grayana var. hypoleuca Nakai; Leucothoe grayana var. oblongifolia (Miq.) H.Ohba & S.Akiyama; Leucothoe grayana var. parvifolia (H.Hara) T.Yamaz.; Leucothoe grayana var. pruinosa (H.Hara) Yokouchi ex T.Shimizu; Leucothoe grayana var. tschonoskii (Maxim.) Takeda; Leucothoe grayana var. venosa Nakai; Leucothoe grayana var. yezoensis Tatew.; Leucothoe tschonoskii Maxim.; Lyonia grayana (Maxim.) Beissn., Schelle & Zabel

= Eubotryoides =

Species of plant

Eubotryoides grayana (syn. Leucothoe grayana), is a species of flowering plant in the family Ericaceae, native to the southern Kuril Islands and to northern and central Japan. It is the sole member of its genus, Eubotryoides. A highly variable deciduous or semi-evergreen shrub reaching 4 ft (1.2 m), it is distinguished from members of the closely related dog‑hobble genus Leucothoe by its terminal racemes.
