= Sourwood Mountain =

Traditional American folk song

"Sourwood Mountain" (Roud 754) is a traditional American folk song. Like many folk songs, there are numerous lyrical versions extant; however, there are certain commonalities. The song's theme is a lament over the narrator's true love, from whom he is separated. The title comes from the opening line, which is invariably "Chicken's (a) crowing on Sourwood Mountain". Each verse of the song consists of a rhyming couplet interspersed with a nonsense refrain, for example:

Chicken's a-crowing on Sourwood Mountain
Hey-ho diddle-um day
So many pretty girls I can't count them
Hey-ho diddle-um day

"Sourwood Mountain" is most closely associated with the music of Appalachia; however, there are versions native to New England as well.

== See also ==
- Sourwood
