= Eremotropa =

Scientific classification
- Kingdom: Plantae
- Clade: Tracheophytes
- Clade: Angiosperms
- Clade: Eudicots
- Clade: Asterids
- Order: Ericales
- Family: Ericaceae
- Subfamily: Monotropoideae
- Genus: Eremotropa; Andres (1953)
- Species: E. sciaphila

Binomial name
- Eremotropa sciaphila Andres (1953)

Synonyms
- Eremotropa wuana Y.L.Chou (1981); Monotropastrum sciaphilum (Andres) G.D.Wallace (1987)

Genus of flowering plants

Eremotropa sciaphila is a species of flowering plant in the heath family, Ericaceae. It is the sole species in genus Eremotropa. It is a holoparasitic perennial native to central Yunnan Province in south-central China.
