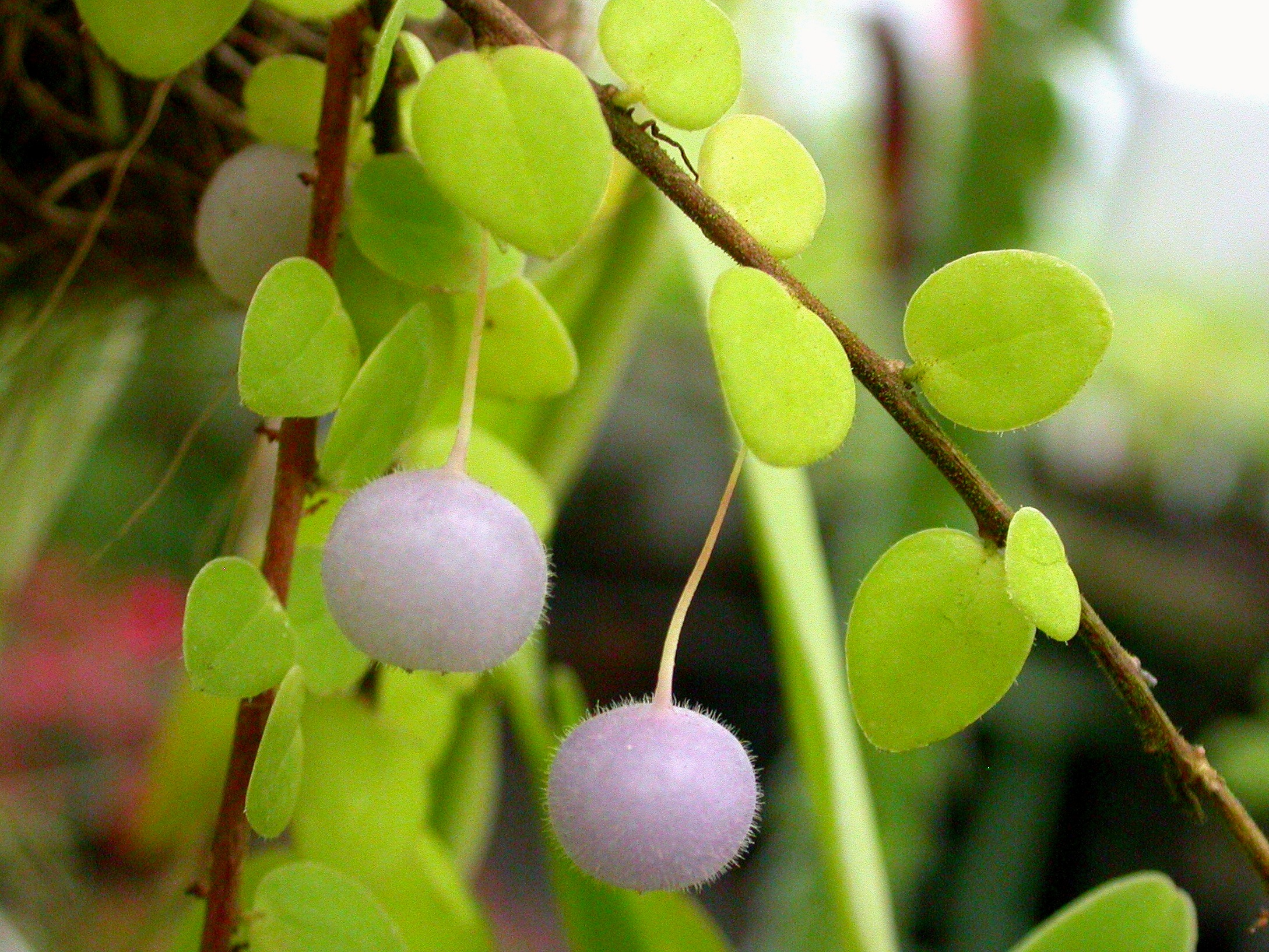
- Sphyrospermum buxifolium

Scientific classification
- Kingdom: Plantae
- Clade: Tracheophytes
- Clade: Angiosperms
- Clade: Eudicots
- Clade: Asterids
- Order: Ericales
- Family: Ericaceae
- Subfamily: Vaccinioideae
- Tribe: Vaccinieae
- Genus: Sphyrospermum; Poepp. & Endl.

Synonyms
- Sophoclesia Klotzsch

= Sphyrospermum =

Genus of flowering plants

Sphyrospermum is a genus of flowering plants belonging to the family Ericaceae.

Its native range is Mexico to Tropical America.

Species:

- Sphyrospermum boekei Luteyn
- Sphyrospermum buesii A.C.Sm.
- Sphyrospermum buxifolium Poepp. & Endl.
- Sphyrospermum campanulatum Luteyn
- Sphyrospermum dissimile (S.F.Blake) Luteyn
- Sphyrospermum dolichanthum Luteyn
- Sphyrospermum flaviflorum A.C.Sm.
- Sphyrospermum glutinosum Luteyn & Pedraza
- Sphyrospermum grandiflorum Cornejo & Pedraza
- Sphyrospermum grandifolium (Hoerold) A.C.Sm.
- Sphyrospermum haughtii A.C.Sm.
- Sphyrospermum lanceolatum Luteyn
- Sphyrospermum linearifolium Al.Rodr. & J.F.Morales
- Sphyrospermum microphyllum Sleumer
- Sphyrospermum munchiqueense Luteyn
- Sphyrospermum muscicola (Hook.) A.C.Sm.
- Sphyrospermum revolutum Luteyn
- Sphyrospermum rotundifolium Luteyn
- Sphyrospermum sessiliflorum Luteyn
- Sphyrospermum sodiroi (Hoerold) A.C.Sm.
- Sphyrospermum spruceanum Sleumer
- Sphyrospermum xanthocarpum Pedraza
