= Periclesia =

Scientific classification
- Kingdom: Plantae
- Clade: Tracheophytes
- Clade: Angiosperms
- Clade: Eudicots
- Clade: Asterids
- Order: Ericales
- Family: Ericaceae
- Genus: Periclesia; A.C.Sm.

Synonyms
- Ceratostema flexuosum (A.C.Sm.) J.F.Macbr.

Genus of flowering plants

Periclesia is a monotypic genus of flowering plants belonging to the family Ericaceae. It only contains one known species, Periclesia flexuosa A.C.Sm. It is also with the Vaccinioideae subfamily and the Vaccinieae tribe.

It is native to Ecuador.

The genus name of Periclesia is in honour of Pericles (c. 490 BC – 429 BC), a Greek statesman and general during the Golden Age of Athens. The Latin specific epithet of flexuosa refers to flexuosus meaning twisted. Both the genus and the species were first described and published in Contr. U.S. Natl. Herb. Vol.28 on page 357 in 1932.

The genus is not recognised by United States Department of Agriculture and the Agricultural Research Service, they list it as a synonym of Ceratostema Juss.
