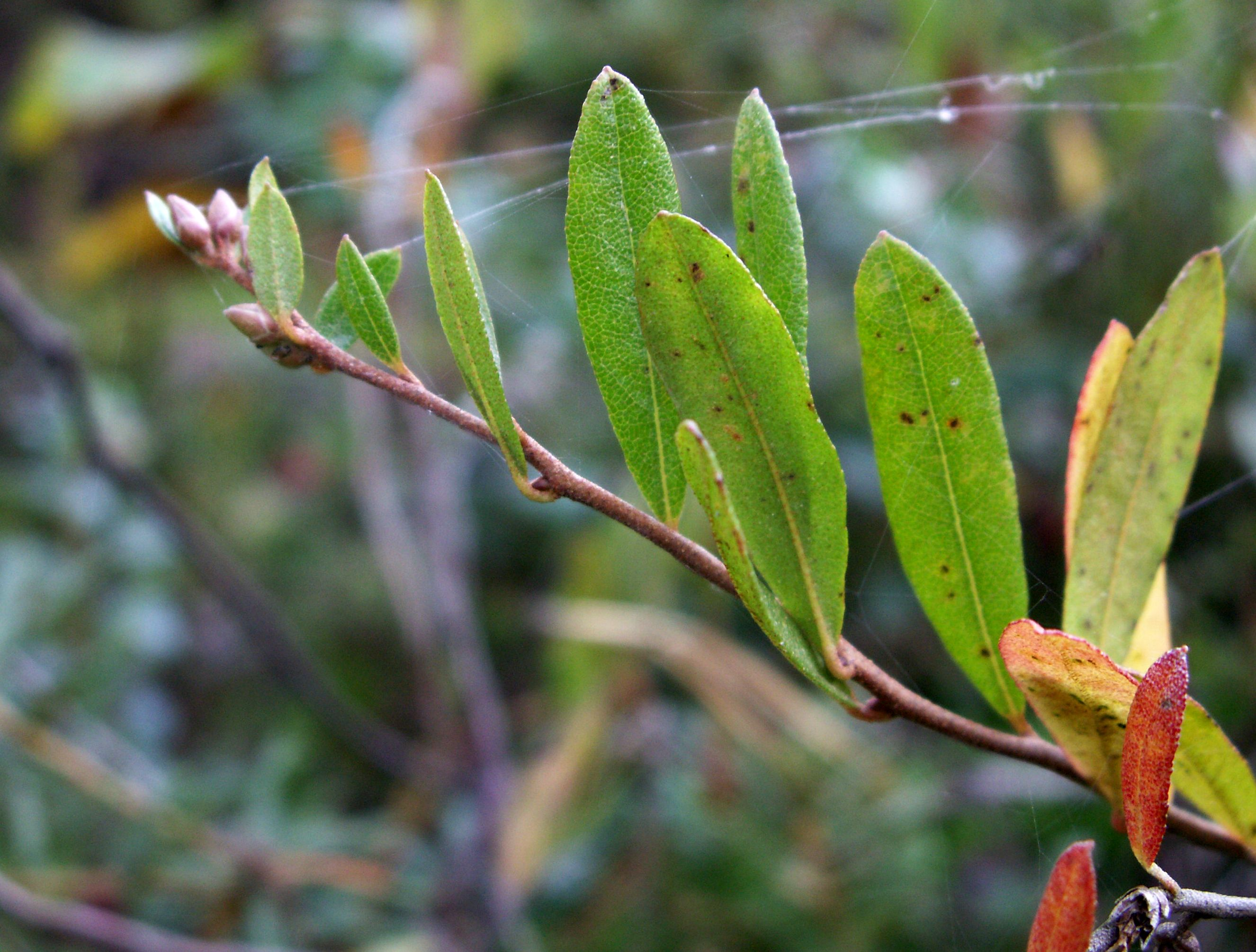

Conservation status
- Least Concern (IUCN 3.1)

Scientific classification
- Kingdom: Plantae
- Clade: Tracheophytes
- Clade: Angiosperms
- Clade: Eudicots
- Clade: Asterids
- Order: Ericales
- Family: Ericaceae
- Subfamily: Vaccinioideae
- Tribe: Gaultherieae
- Genus: Chamaedaphne; Moench
- Species: C. calyculata

Binomial name
- Chamaedaphne calyculata (L.) Moench

Synonyms
- List: Andromeda angustifolia (Aiton) Pursh; Andromeda calyculata L.; Andromeda calyculata var. angustifolia Aiton; Andromeda calyculata var. anomala Vent.; Andromeda calyculata var. latifolia Aiton; Andromeda calyculata var. nana G.Lodd.; Andromeda crispa Poir.; Cassandra angustifolia (Aiton) D.Don; Cassandra angustifolia var. anomala (Vent.) DC.; Cassandra calyculata (L.) D.Don; Cassandra calyculata var. angustifolia (Aiton) A.Gray; Cassandra calyculata var. latifolia (Aiton) F.Seym.; Cassandra calyculata var. nana (G.Lodd.) Bean; Chamaedaphne calyculata var. angustifolia (Aiton) Rehder; Chamaedaphne calyculata var. latifolia (Aiton) Fernald; Chamaedaphne calyculata subsp. nana (G.Lodd.) A.P.Khokhr.; Chamaedaphne calyculata var. nana (G.Lodd.) Rehder; Chamaedaphne crispa (Poir.) Spach; Exolepta calyculata (L.) Raf.; Hydragonum calyculatum (L.) Kuntze; Lyonia calyculata (L.) Rchb.; Lyonia calyculata f. crispa (Poir.) Zabel

= Chamaedaphne =

Genus of flowering plants

Chamaedaphne calyculata, known commonly as leatherleaf or cassandra, is a perennial dwarf shrub in the plant family Ericaceae and the only species in the genus Chamaedaphne. It is commonly seen in cold, acidic bogs and forms large, spreading colonies.

== Description ==
Chamaedaphne calyculata is a low-growing, upright dwarf shrub up to 1.5 m tall. The leaves are alternately arranged on the branch and elliptical to oblong shaped, 1–4 cm long and 0.5-1.5 cm wide. The leaves are thick and leathery, dull green above with minute, silvery scales, and paler green or brownish beneath. The margins of the leaves are entire or slightly and irregularly toothed, with short petioles. The plant is evergreen but leaves often turn red-brown in winter. The lower stems extend into sphagnum, peat moss, or other substrate, and may persist even after fire or mild drought.

The plant flowers in April to June, and is insect-pollinated. Flowers are small (5–6 mm long), white, and bell-like, produced in terminal racemes up to 12 cm long, with flowers emerging from the axils (between leaf and stem) of small leaves on the raceme. The flowers have fused petals with 5 short lobes. The fruit is a capsule, a dry fruit that splits open to release seeds.

== Etymology ==
The name Chamaedaphne is said to be derived from the Greek word chamae for "on the ground," and daphne, meaning "laurel." In ancient Greek chamai (χαμαί) expresses "on the ground". The common name refers to its tough, leather-like leaf.

== Habitat ==
Chamaedaphne calyculata has a circumboreal distribution throughout the cool temperate and subarctic regions of the Northern Hemisphere from eastern North America to bogs in Finland and Japan. The species site is mostly restricted to bogs, but also occur in shrubby fens, rock crevices, and pool margins. Leatherleaf naturally forms large clonal colonies, but is very shade-intolerant. Nutrients are low in bogs due to low mineralization, and plants can only acquire nutrients from atmospheric sources.

== Uses ==
Leatherleaf is used as a food plant by the larvae of some Lepidoptera species including Coleophora ledi. In ornamental usage, leatherleaf is widely used by florists as a filler green in bouquets and arrangements. Ethnobotanically, the plant has usage as "sun-tea," a drink in which dried or fresh leaves are steeped in cool water in a sunny location. This technique is used to avoid boiling it as a traditional infusion, which carries the danger of releasing andromedotoxin, a common toxin present in plants of the family Ericaceae. Leatherleaf also has limited medicinal use among some Native American tribes as a poultice of leaves for inflammation.
