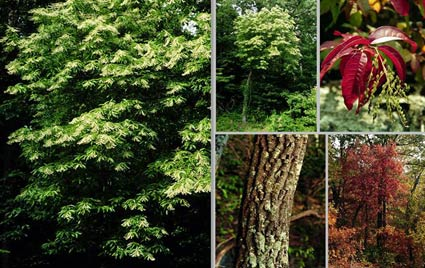

Conservation status
- Least Concern (IUCN 3.1)

- Secure (NatureServe)

Scientific classification
- Kingdom: Plantae
- Clade: Tracheophytes
- Clade: Angiosperms
- Clade: Eudicots
- Clade: Asterids
- Order: Ericales
- Family: Ericaceae
- Subfamily: Vaccinioideae
- Tribe: Oxydendreae; Cox
- Genus: Oxydendrum; DC.
- Species: O. arboreum

Binomial name
- Oxydendrum arboreum (L.) DC.
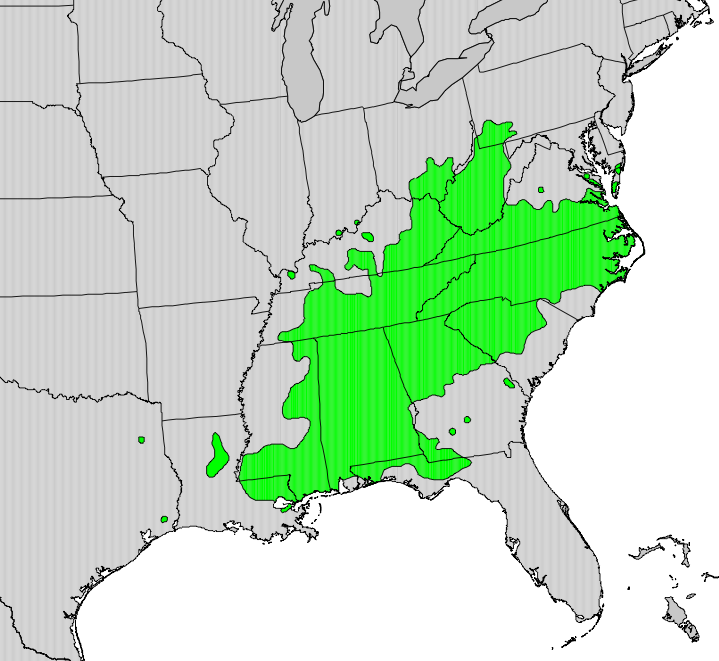

= Oxydendrum =

Sourwood

Genus of trees

Oxydendrum arboreum (/ˌɒksɪˈdɛndrəm ɑːrˈbɔːriəm/ OK-sih-DEN-drəm ar-BOR-ee-əm), commonly known as sourwood or sorrel tree, is the sole species in the genus Oxydendrum, in the family Ericaceae. It is native to eastern North America, from southern Pennsylvania south to northwest Florida and west to southern Illinois; it is most common in the lower chain of the Appalachian Mountains. The tree is frequently seen as a component of oak-heath forests.

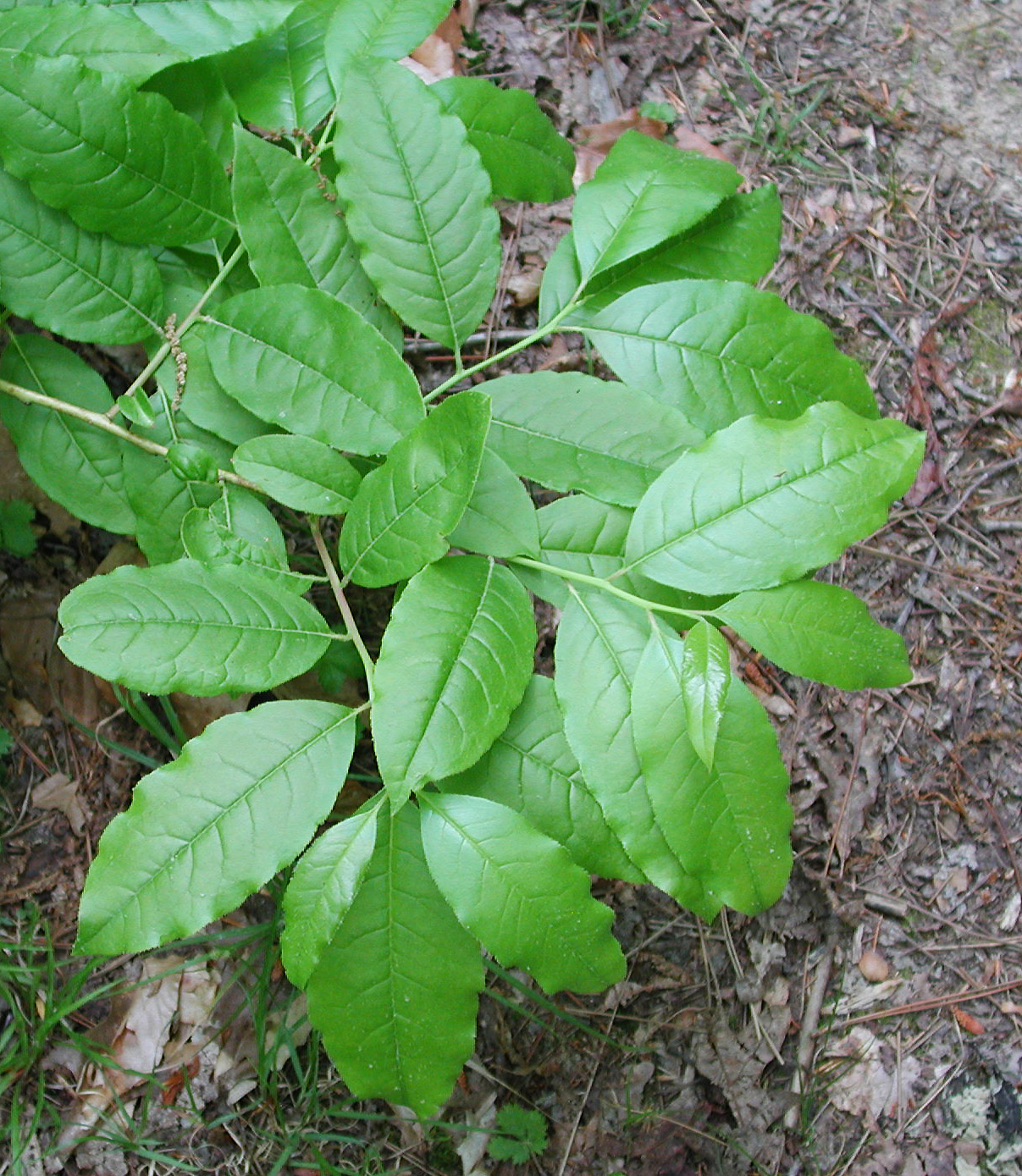
Foliage

== Growth ==
Sourwood is a small tree or large shrub, growing to 10–20 m (33–66 ft) tall with a trunk up to 50 cm (20 in) diameter. Occasionally on extremely productive sites, this species can reach heights in excess of 30 meters and 60 cm diameter. The leaves are alternately arranged, deciduous, 8–20 cm (3.1–7.9 in) long and 4–9 cm (1.6–3.5 in) broad, with a finely serrated margin; they are dark green in summer, but turn vivid red in fall. The flowers are white, bell-shaped, 6–9 mm ( 1/4 to 1/3 inch) long, produced on 15–25 cm (5.9–9.8 in) long panicles. The fruit is a small woody capsule. The roots are shallow, and the tree grows best when there is little root competition; it also requires acidic soils for successful growth. The leaves can be chewed (but should not be swallowed) to help alleviate a dry-feeling mouth.

== Description ==
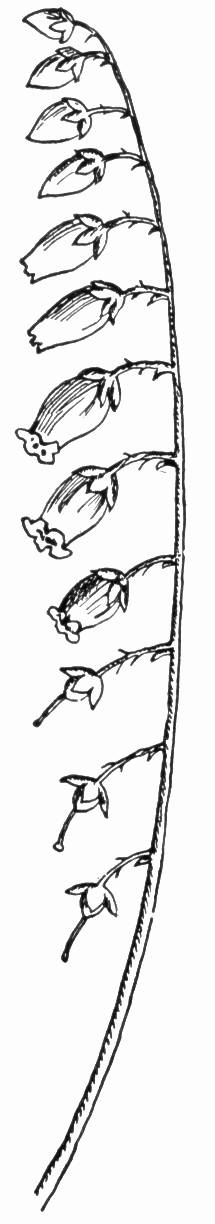
Raceme of flowers

The bark is gray with a reddish tinge, deeply furrowed and scaly. Branchlets at first are light yellow green, but later turn reddish brown. The wood is reddish brown, with paler sapwood; it is heavy, hard, and close-grained, and will take a high polish. Its specific gravity is 0.7458, with a density of 46.48 lb/cu ft.

The winter buds are axillary, minute, dark red, and partly immersed in the bark. Inner scales enlarge when spring growth begins.

Leaves are alternate, four to seven inches long, 1.5 to 2.5 inches wide, oblong to oblanceolate, wedge-shaped at the base, serrate, and acute or acuminate. Leaf veins are feather-veined, the midrib is conspicuous. They emerge from the bud revolute, bronze green and shining, and smooth; when full-grown, they are dark green, shining above, and pale and glaucous below. In autumn, they turn bright scarlet. Petioles are long and slender, with stipules wanting. They are heavily laden with acid.

In June and July, cream-white flowers are borne in terminal panicles of secund racemes seven to eight inches long; rachis and short pedicels are downy. The calyx is five-parted and persistent; lobes are valvate in bud. The corolla is ovoid-cylindric, narrowed at the throat, cream-white, and five-toothed. The 10 stamens are inserted on the corolla; filaments are wider than the anthers; anthers are two-celled. The pistil is ovary superior, ovoid, and five-celled; the style is columnar; the stigma is simple; the disk is ten-toothed, and ovules are many.

The fruit is a capsule, downy, five-valved, five-angled, and tipped by the persistent style; the pedicels are curving.

== Cultivation and uses ==
The sourwood is hardy in the north and a worthy ornamental tree in lawns and parks. Its late bloom makes it desirable, and its autumnal coloring is particularly beautiful and brilliant. The leaves are heavily charged with acid, and to some extent have the poise of those of the peach. The leaves are also a laxative.

Sourwood is renowned for the honey that bees produce from the nectar of its flowers. Juice from its blooms is used to make sourwood jelly. The shoots were used by the Cherokee and the Catawba to make arrowshafts.

== In Appalachian culture ==
Sourwood Mountain is a popular old-time tune in the Appalachian region of the United States.

== Gallery ==
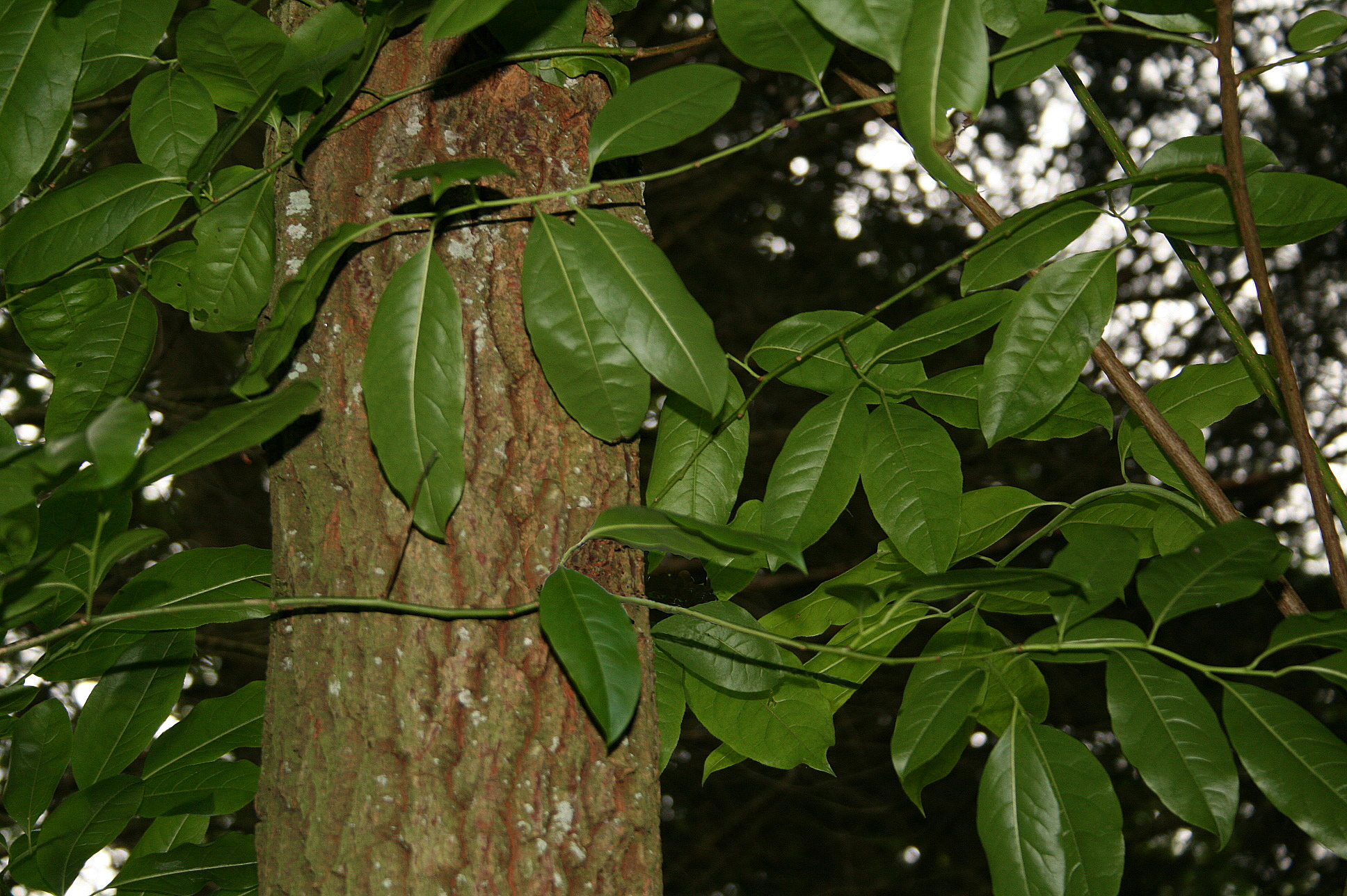
Trunk and leaves

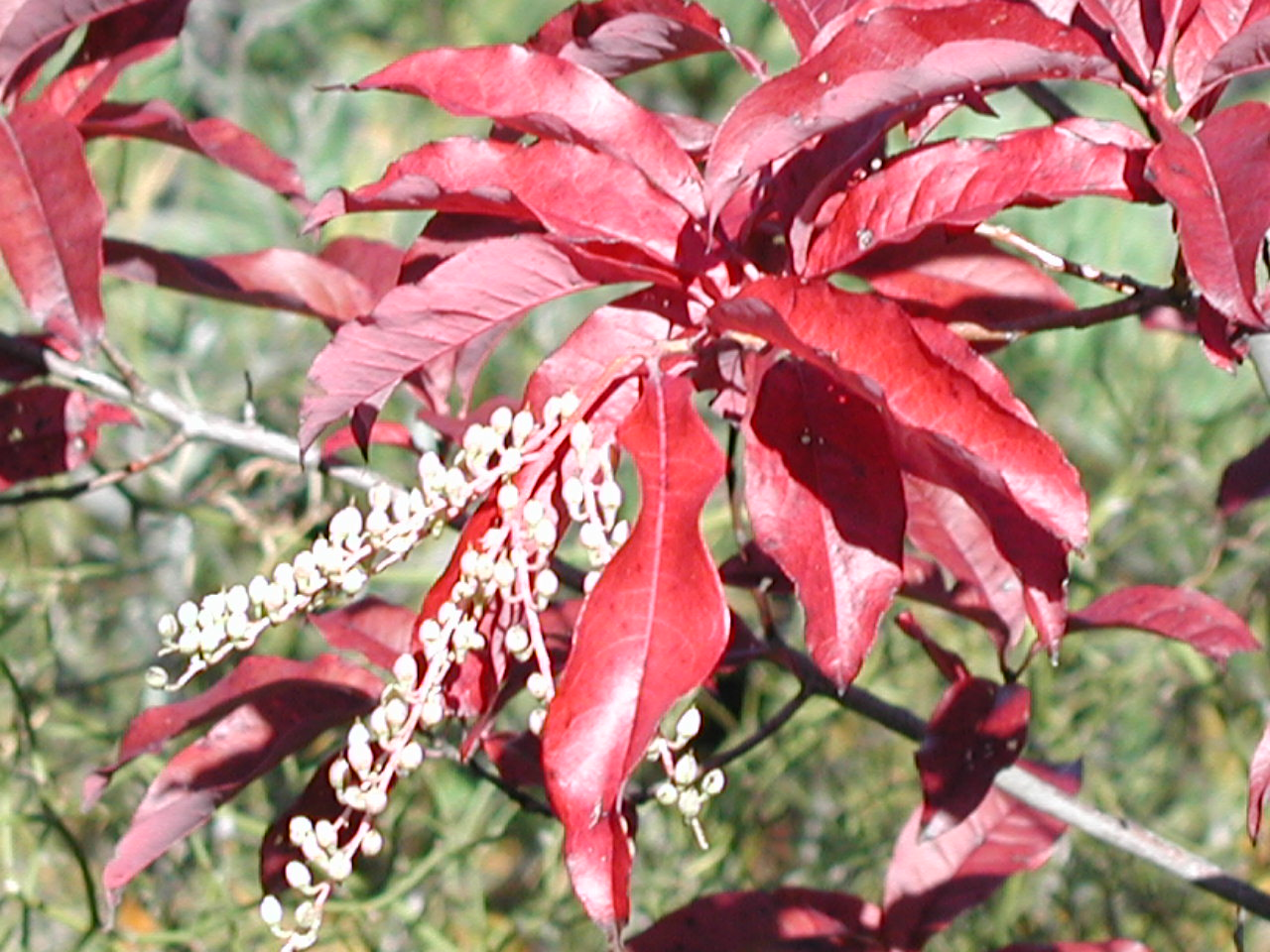
Sourwood in autumn foliage on top of Pilot Mtn., NC.
