= Utleya =

Scientific classification
- Kingdom: Plantae
- Clade: Embryophytes
- Clade: Tracheophytes
- Clade: Angiosperms
- Clade: Eudicots
- Clade: Asterids
- Order: Ericales
- Family: Ericaceae
- Subfamily: Vaccinioideae
- Tribe: Vaccinieae
- Genus: Utleya; Wilbur & Luteyn
- Species: U. costaricensis

Binomial name
- Utleya costaricensis Wilbur & Luteyn

Species of flowering plant

Utleya is a genus of flowering plants belonging to the family Ericaceae. It only contains one known species, Utleya costaricensis.

It is native to Costa Rica.

The genus name of Utleya is in honour of Kathleen Burt-Utley (b. 1944) and her husband John F. Utley (b. 1944), both American botanists at the University of Florida and the University of New Orleans. The Latin specific epithet of costaricensis means "of the Costa Rica", where the plant was found.

Both the genus and the sole species were first described and published in Brittonia Vol.29 on page 267 in 1977. The genus is recognized by the United States Department of Agriculture and the Agricultural Research Service, but they do not list any known species.
