= Mycerinus (plant) =

Scientific classification
- Kingdom: Plantae
- Clade: Tracheophytes
- Clade: Angiosperms
- Clade: Eudicots
- Clade: Asterids
- Order: Ericales
- Family: Ericaceae
- Subfamily: Vaccinioideae
- Tribe: Vaccinieae
- Genus: Mycerinus; A.C.Sm.

Type species
- Mycerinus sclerophyllus A.C.Sm.

Species
- See here
- It is endemic to Venezuela

Genus of plants

Mycerinus is a genus of plant in the family Ericaceae endemic to Venezuela.

== Taxonomy ==
It was published by Albert Charles Smith in 1931 with Mycerinus sclerophyllus A.C. Sm. as the type species. Within the subfamily Vaccinioideae, it is placed in the tribe Vaccinieae.

=== Species ===
It has three species:

- Mycerinus chimantensis Maguire, Steyerm. & Luteyn
- Mycerinus sclerophyllus A.C.Sm.
- Mycerinus viridiflorus Steyerm. & Maguire
