= Costera (plant) =

Scientific classification
- Kingdom: Plantae
- Clade: Tracheophytes
- Clade: Angiosperms
- Clade: Eudicots
- Clade: Asterids
- Order: Ericales
- Family: Ericaceae
- Subfamily: Vaccinioideae
- Tribe: Vaccinieae
- Genus: Costera; J.J.Sm.

Type species
- Costera ovalifolia J.J.Sm.

Synonyms
- Cymothoe; Iaera

Genus of plants

Costera is a genus in the Ericaceae found in the Malesian floristic region. It is a small genus of often epiphytic shrubs that grows in tropical rainforests.

== Description ==
Costera is a small genus of shrubs with glabrous, leathery, unlobed leaves arranged in alternate phyllotaxy. The inflorescences are axile and sessile; flowers emerge in bundles directly from the stem.

The flowers are small and tetramerous or pentamerous. They are directly attached to the stem via a pedicel with 2 basal bracts. The calyx is mostly fused and forms 4 or 5 apical teeth, which are the unfused tips of the sepals. The 4 or 5 petals are also fused into a short tube, and the inner surface of the corolla contains minute laciniate projections toward the base. The alternating stamens are lightly appressed to the corolla and have a short linear filament. The anthers are elongated, tubular, and erect. They face inward and release pollen through an apical pore. The ovary is inferior and is divided into 4 or 5 locules with many ovules; the original description notes that the number of locules may vary by species. The style is straight, with a stigma that is minutely thickened. The nectary disc is ring-shaped and inconspicuous. The fruit is subspherical and is crowned by the calyx.

Members of Costera may be confused with Vaccinium, from which they can be distinguished by their glabrous leaves and lack of a line of articulation in the pedicel that is found in Bornean Vaccinium species. Their bundled, sessile inflorescences resemble those of Diplycosia.

== Taxonomy and naming ==
Costera was described in the fourth volume of the Icones Bogoriensis in 1914 by Johannes Jacobus Smith. It is placed in the Vaccinieae, where it may be one of the most genetically divergent members. Smith named the genus after his mentor, Jan Constantijn Costerus. Smith records tjapien djanten as an indigenous name for the plant originating from the Karimata Islands.

As of February 2023, it consists of 10 accepted species:

- Costera borneensis J.J.Sm.
- Costera cyclophylla (Airy Shaw) J.J.Sm. & Airy Shaw
- Costera endertii J.J.Sm.
- Costera lanaensis (Merr.) Airy Shaw & J.J.Sm.
- Costera loheri (Merr.) Airy Shaw & J.J.Sm.
- Costera lucida (Merr.) Airy Shaw & J.J.Sm.
- Costera macrantha Argent
- Costera ovalifolia J.J.Sm.
- Costera sumatrana J.J.Sm.
- Costera tetramera Sleumer
