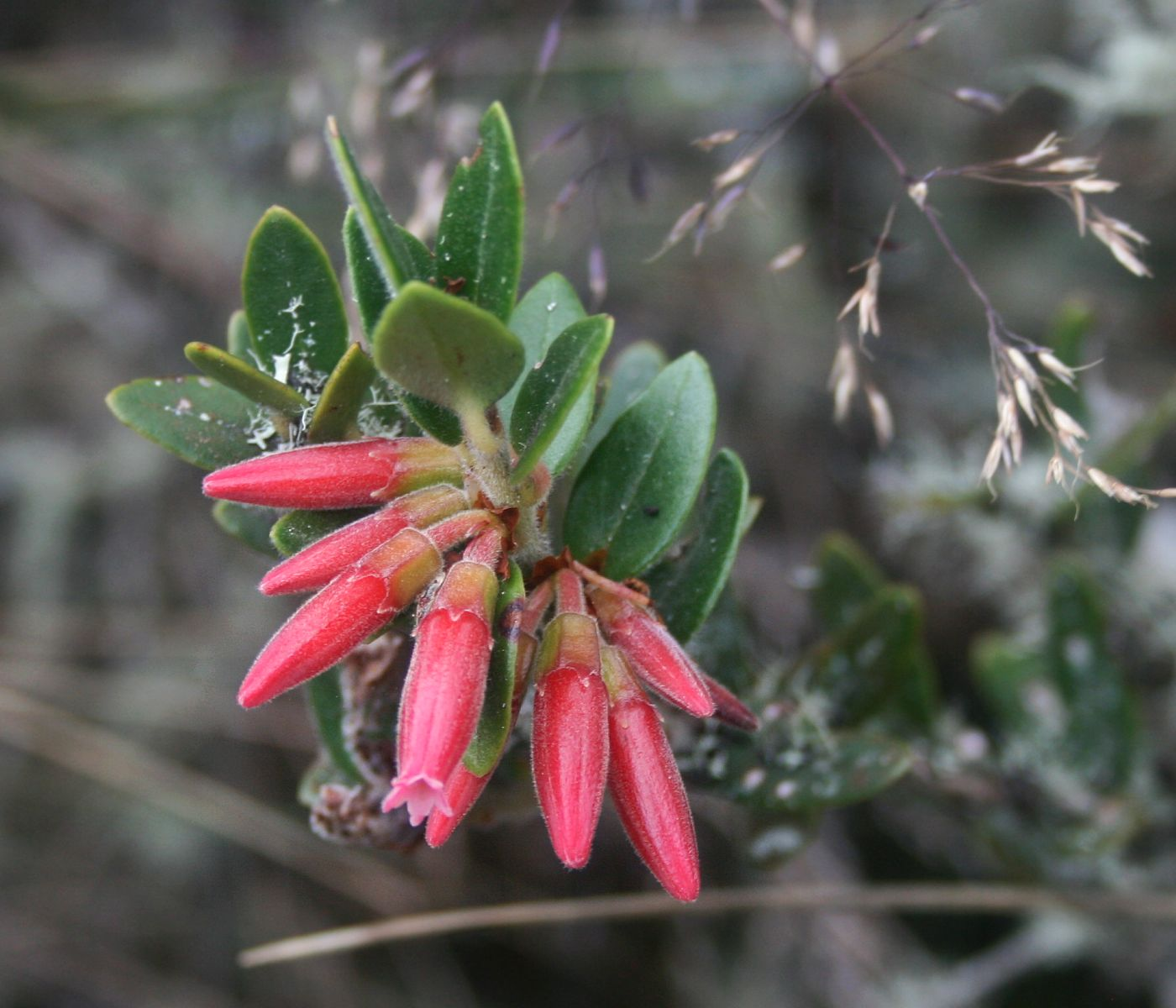
- Plutarchia guascensis

Scientific classification
- Kingdom: Plantae
- Clade: Tracheophytes
- Clade: Angiosperms
- Clade: Eudicots
- Clade: Asterids
- Order: Ericales
- Family: Ericaceae
- Genus: Plutarchia; A.C.Sm.

= Plutarchia (plant) =

Genus of flowering plant

Plutarchia is a genus of flowering plants belonging to the family Ericaceae.

It is native to Colombia and Ecuador.

The genus name of Plutarchia is in honour of Plutarch (c. 45 – c. 125), a Greek Middle Platonist philosopher, historian, biographer, essayist, and priest at the Temple of Apollo in Delphi. It was first described and published in Bull. Torrey Bot. Club Vol.63 on page 311 in 1936.

== Known species ==
According to Kew:

- Plutarchia angulata A.C.Sm.
- Plutarchia coronaria (Hook.f.) A.C.Sm.
- Plutarchia dasyphylla A.C.Sm.
- Plutarchia dichogama (Cuatrec.) Sleumer
- Plutarchia dolos N.R.Salinas, M.F.González, E.Hern.-A. & Betancur
- Plutarchia ecuadorensis Luteyn
- Plutarchia guascensis (Cuatrec.) A.C.Sm.
- Plutarchia minor A.C.Sm.
- Plutarchia miranda A.C.Sm.
- Plutarchia monantha A.C.Sm.
- Plutarchia pubiflora (Wedd.) A.C.Sm.
- Plutarchia rigida (Benth.) A.C.Sm.
