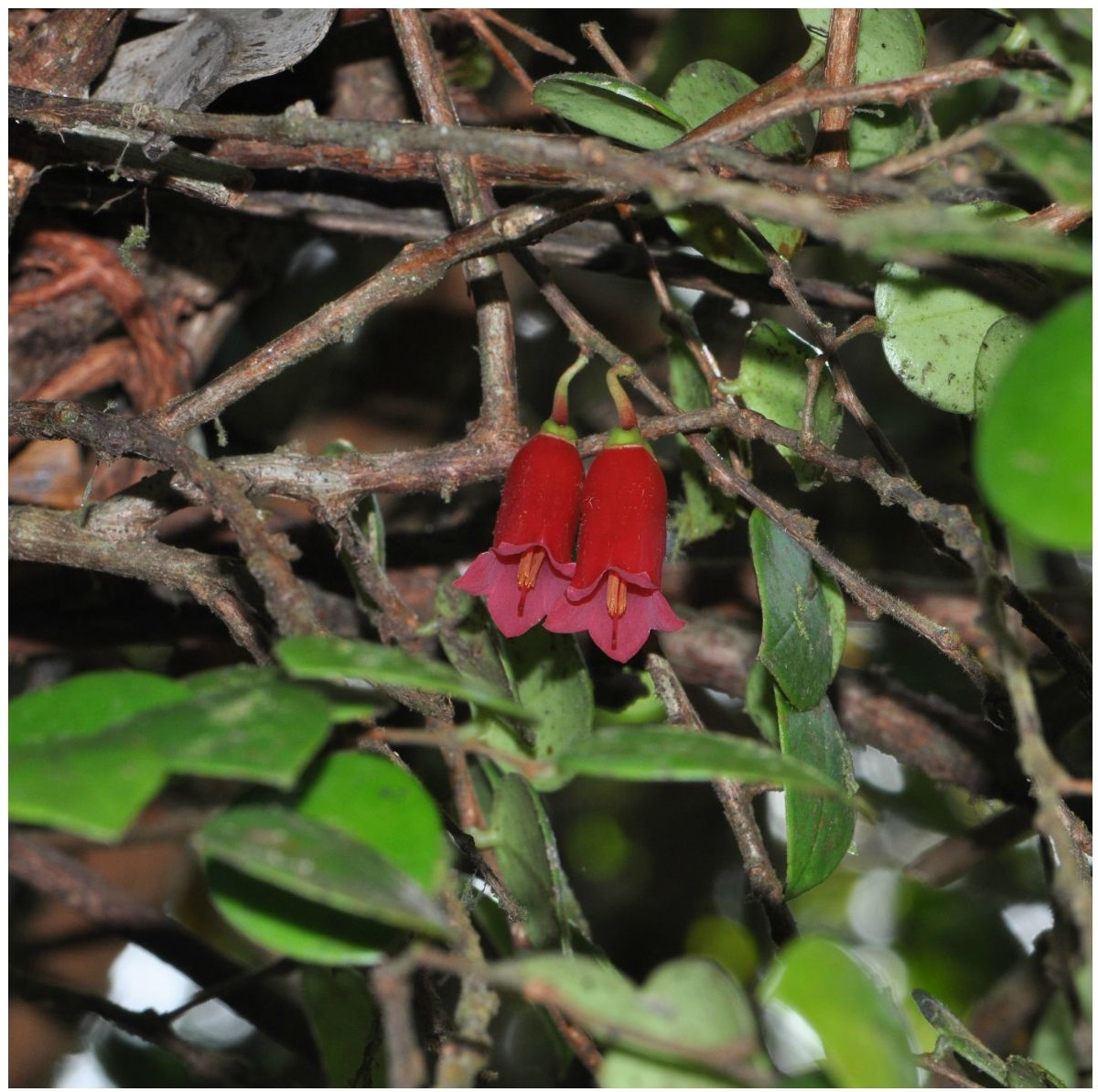
- Gonocalyx concolor

Scientific classification
- Kingdom: Plantae
- Clade: Tracheophytes
- Clade: Angiosperms
- Clade: Eudicots
- Clade: Asterids
- Order: Ericales
- Family: Ericaceae
- Genus: Gonocalyx; Planch. & Linden

= Gonocalyx =

Genus of plants

Gonocalyx is a genus of flowering plants belonging to the family Ericaceae.

Its native range is Costa Rica to Colombia, Caribbean.

Species:

- Gonocalyx almedae Luteyn
- Gonocalyx amplexicaulis Luteyn
- Gonocalyx concolor Nevling
- Gonocalyx costaricensis Luteyn
- Gonocalyx lilliae Al.Rodr. & J.F.Morales
- Gonocalyx megabracteolatus (Wilbur & Luteyn) Luteyn
- Gonocalyx portoricensis (Urb.) A.C.Sm.
- Gonocalyx pterocarpus (Donn.Sm.) Luteyn
- Gonocalyx pulcher Planch. & Linden
- Gonocalyx smilacifolius (Griseb.) A.C.Sm.
- Gonocalyx tetrapterus Alain
