= Didonica =

Scientific classification
- Kingdom: Plantae
- Clade: Tracheophytes
- Clade: Angiosperms
- Clade: Eudicots
- Clade: Asterids
- Order: Ericales
- Family: Ericaceae
- Genus: Didonica; Luteyn & Wilbur

Genus of plants

Didonica is a genus of flowering plants belonging to the family Ericaceae.

Its native range is Central America.

Species:

- Didonica crassiflora Luteyn
- Didonica panamensis Luteyn & Wilbur
- Didonica pendula Luteyn & Wilbur
- Didonica subsessilis Luteyn
