= Siphonandra =

Scientific classification
- Kingdom: Plantae
- Clade: Tracheophytes
- Clade: Angiosperms
- Clade: Eudicots
- Clade: Asterids
- Order: Ericales
- Family: Ericaceae
- Genus: Siphonandra; Klotzsch

Genus of plants

Siphonandra is a genus of flowering plants belonging to the family Ericaceae.

Its native range is Peru to Bolivia.

== Species ==
Species:

- Siphonandra boliviana Luteyn
- Siphonandra elliptica (Ruiz & Pav.) Klotzsch
- Siphonandra magnifica Sleumer
- Siphonandra nervosa Luteyn & E.M.Ortiz
- Siphonandra santa-barbarense Luteyn & E.M.Ortiz
