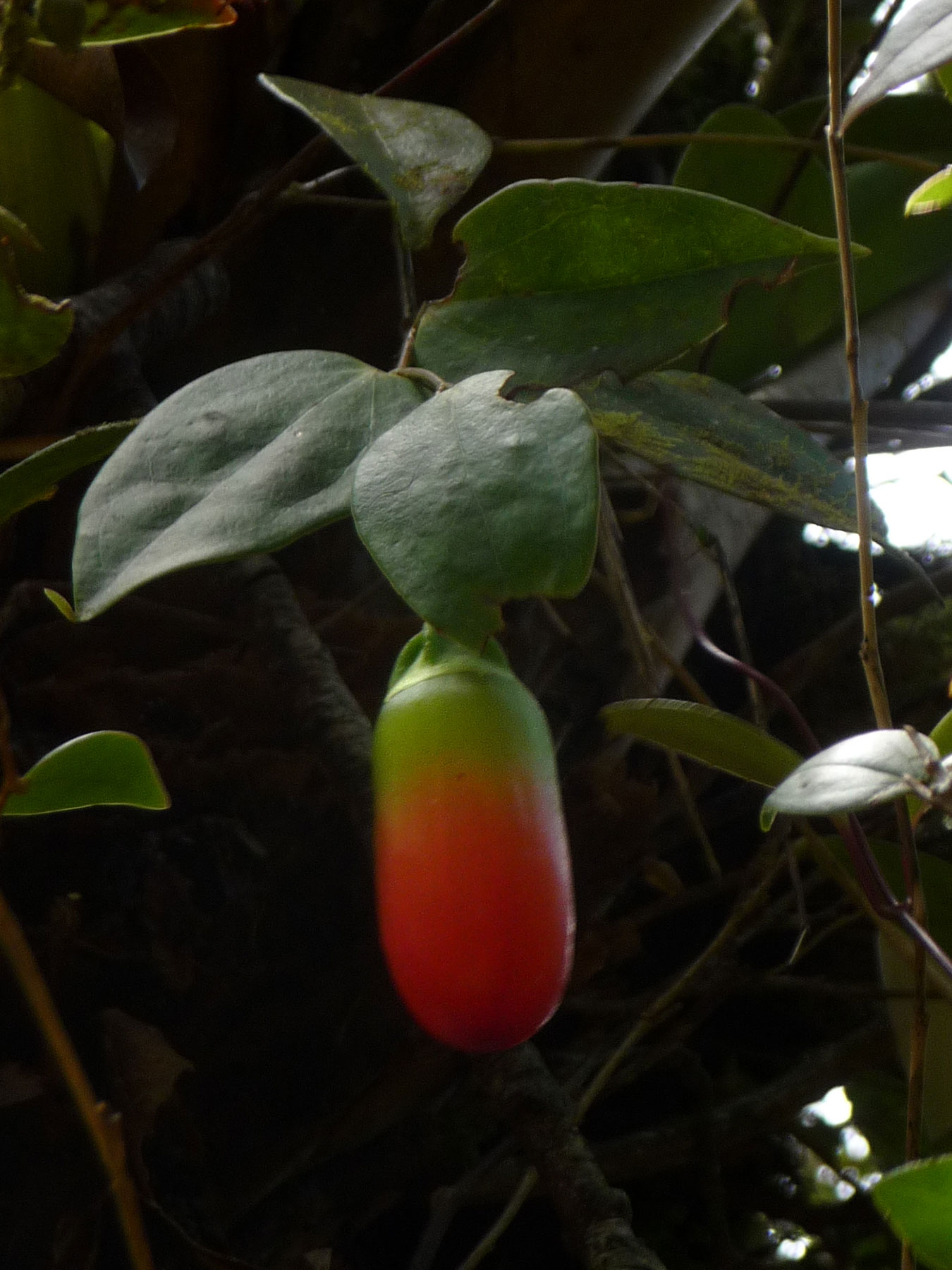
- Semiramisia speciosa

Scientific classification
- Kingdom: Plantae
- Clade: Tracheophytes
- Clade: Angiosperms
- Clade: Eudicots
- Clade: Asterids
- Order: Ericales
- Family: Ericaceae
- Genus: Semiramisia; Klotzsch

= Semiramisia =

Genus of plants

Semiramisia is a genus of flowering plants belonging to the family Ericaceae.

Its native range is Western South America to Venezuela.

== Species ==
Species:

- Semiramisia alata Luteyn
- Semiramisia karsteniana Klotzsch
- Semiramisia pulcherrima A.C.Sm.
- Semiramisia speciosa (Benth.) Klotzsch
