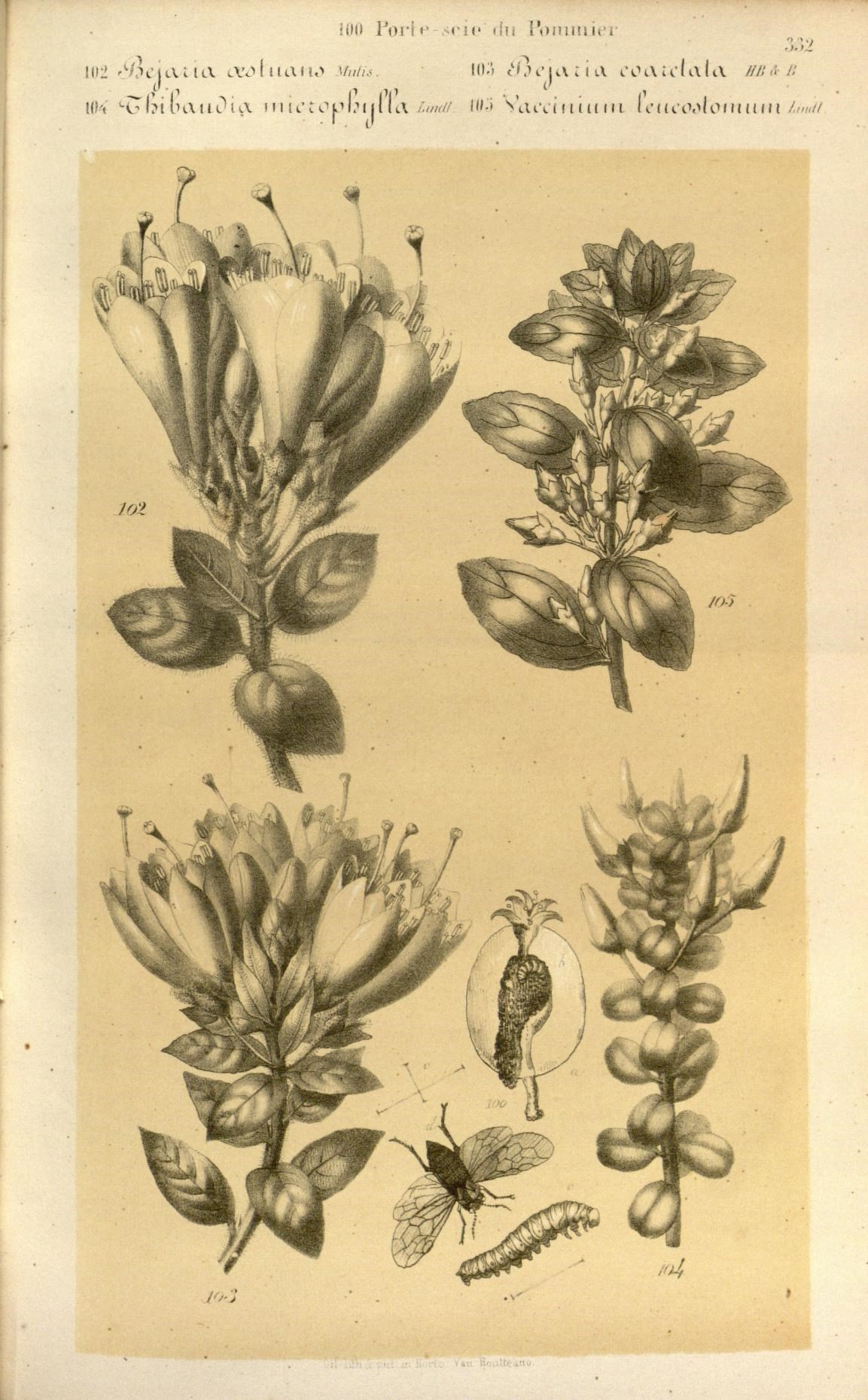

Scientific classification
- Kingdom: Plantae
- Clade: Tracheophytes
- Clade: Angiosperms
- Clade: Eudicots
- Clade: Asterids
- Order: Ericales
- Family: Ericaceae
- Genus: Demosthenesia; A.C.Sm.

= Demosthenesia =

Genus of plants

Demosthenesia is a genus of flowering plants belonging to the family Ericaceae.

Its native range is Peru to Bolivia and Brazil.

The genus name of Demosthenesia is in honour of Demosthenes (384–322 BC), a Greek politician.

Species known:

- Demosthenesia amicorum (Sleumer) Sleumer
- Demosthenesia buxifolia (Fielding & Gardner) A.C.Sm.
- Demosthenesia cordifolia Luteyn
- Demosthenesia dudleyi D.R.Simpson
- Demosthenesia fabulosa (Sleumer) A.C.Sm.
- Demosthenesia mandonii (Britton) A.C.Sm.
- Demosthenesia matsiguenka Huamantupa
- Demosthenesia microphylla (Hoerold) A.C.Sm.
- Demosthenesia oppositifolia Luteyn
- Demosthenesia pearcei (Britton) A.C.Sm.
- Demosthenesia spectabilis (Rusby) A.C.Sm.
- Demosthenesia vilcabambensis Luteyn
- Demosthenesia weberbaueri (Sleumer) Sleumer
