= Notopora =

Scientific classification
- Kingdom: Plantae
- Clade: Tracheophytes
- Clade: Angiosperms
- Clade: Eudicots
- Clade: Asterids
- Order: Ericales
- Family: Ericaceae
- Genus: Notopora; Hook.f.

Genus of plants

Notopora is a genus of flowering plants belonging to the family Ericaceae.

Its native range is Northern South America to Northern Brazil.

== Species ==
Species:

- Notopora auyantepuiensis Steyerm.
- Notopora cardonae A.C.Sm.
- Notopora chimantensis Steyerm. & Maguire
- Notopora schomburgkii Hook.f.
- Notopora smithiana Steyerm. & Maguire
