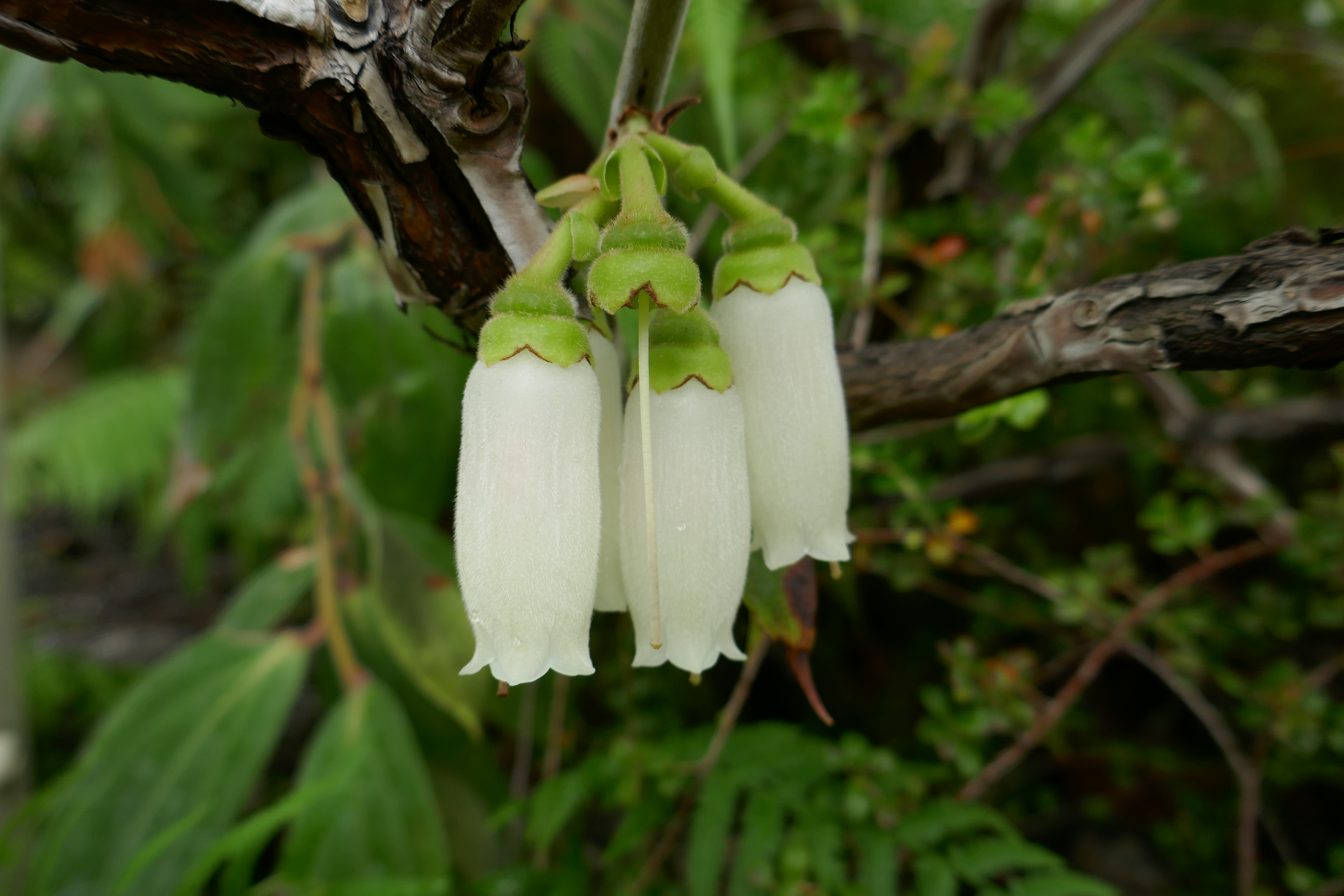
- Dimorphanthera amoena

Scientific classification
- Kingdom: Plantae
- Clade: Tracheophytes
- Clade: Angiosperms
- Clade: Eudicots
- Clade: Asterids
- Order: Ericales
- Family: Ericaceae
- Genus: Dimorphanthera (Drude) F.Muell.

= Dimorphanthera =

Genus of plants

Dimorphanthera is a genus of flowering plants belonging to the family Ericaceae.

Its native range is Central Malesia to Papuasia.

Species:

- Dimorphanthera alba J.J.Sm.
- Dimorphanthera albida P.F.Stevens
- Dimorphanthera albiflora Schltr.
- Dimorphanthera alpina J.J.Sm.
- Dimorphanthera alpivaga Sleumer
- Dimorphanthera amblyornidis (Becc.) F.Muell.
- Dimorphanthera amoena Sleumer
- Dimorphanthera amplifolia (F.Muell.) P.F.Stevens
- Dimorphanthera anchorifera J.J.Sm.
- Dimorphanthera angiliensis P.F.Stevens
- Dimorphanthera anomala P.F.Stevens
- Dimorphanthera antennifera P.F.Stevens
- Dimorphanthera apoana (Merr.) Schltr.
- Dimorphanthera beccariana (Koord.) J.J.Sm.
- Dimorphanthera brachyantha Sleumer
- Dimorphanthera bracteata P.F.Stevens
- Dimorphanthera brevipes Schltr.
- Dimorphanthera calodon Sleumer
- Dimorphanthera collinsii Sleumer
- Dimorphanthera continua (P.F.Stevens) P.F.Stevens
- Dimorphanthera cornuta J.J.Sm.
- Dimorphanthera crassifolia Sleumer
- Dimorphanthera cratericola P.F.Stevens
- Dimorphanthera dekockii J.J.Sm.
- Dimorphanthera denticulifera Sleumer
- Dimorphanthera doctersii J.J.Sm.
- Dimorphanthera dryophila Sleumer
- Dimorphanthera elegantissima K.Schum.
- Dimorphanthera eymae Sleumer
- Dimorphanthera fissiflora (Sleumer) P.F.Stevens
- Dimorphanthera forbesii (F.Muell.) F.Muell.
- Dimorphanthera glauca P.F.Stevens
- Dimorphanthera hirsutiflora Sleumer
- Dimorphanthera ingens (Sleumer) P.F.Stevens
- Dimorphanthera inopinata P.F.Stevens
- Dimorphanthera intermedia J.J.Sm.
- Dimorphanthera kalkmanii Sleumer
- Dimorphanthera kempteriana Schltr.
- Dimorphanthera keysseri (Schltr.) P.F Stevens
- Dimorphanthera lancifolia Sleumer
- Dimorphanthera latifolia Schltr.
- Dimorphanthera leucostoma Sleumer
- Dimorphanthera longifolia Kaneh. & Hatus.
- Dimorphanthera longistyla P.F.Stevens
- Dimorphanthera macbainii (F.Muell.) P.F Stevens
- Dimorphanthera macleaniifolia Wernham
- Dimorphanthera magnifica Sleumer
- Dimorphanthera megacalyx Sleumer
- Dimorphanthera meliphagidum (Becc.) F.Muell. ex J.J.Sm.
- Dimorphanthera microphylla Sleumer
- Dimorphanthera miliraris J.J.Sm.
- Dimorphanthera myzomelae (Becc.) J.J.Sm.
- Dimorphanthera napuensis P.F.Stevens
- Dimorphanthera nigropunctata Sleumer
- Dimorphanthera obtusifolia Sleumer
- Dimorphanthera ovatifolia Sleumer
- Dimorphanthera papillata Stevens ex P.Royen
- Dimorphanthera parviflora J.J.Sm.
- Dimorphanthera parvifolia J.J.Sm.
- Dimorphanthera peekelii Sleumer
- Dimorphanthera prainiana (Koord.) J.J.Sm.
- Dimorphanthera pulchra J.J.Sm.
- Dimorphanthera racemosa Schltr.
- Dimorphanthera robbinsii Sleumer
- Dimorphanthera seramica Argent & Warwick
- Dimorphanthera tedentii P.F.Stevens
- Dimorphanthera thibaudifolia Sleumer
- Dimorphanthera torricellensis Schltr.
- Dimorphanthera umbellata Wernham
- Dimorphanthera vaccinioides Sleumer
- Dimorphanthera velutina Schltr.
- Dimorphanthera vestita Sleumer
- Dimorphanthera viridiflora P.F.Stevens
- Dimorphanthera vonroemeri (Koord.) J.J.Sm.
- Dimorphanthera wickendeniana Argent
- Dimorphanthera wisselensis P.F.Stevens
- Dimorphanthera wollastonii Wernham
- Dimorphanthera womersleyi Sleumer
- Dimorphanthera wrightiana (Koord.) J.J.Sm.
