= Rusbya =

Scientific classification
- Kingdom: Plantae
- Clade: Tracheophytes
- Clade: Angiosperms
- Clade: Eudicots
- Clade: Asterids
- Order: Ericales
- Family: Ericaceae
- Genus: Rusbya; Britton

Species of plant

Rusbya is a monotypic genus of flowering plants belonging to the family Ericaceae. It only contains one known species, Rusbya taxifolia Britton

It is native to Bolivia.

The genus name of Rusbya is in honour of Henry Hurd Rusby (1855–1940), an American botanist, pharmacist and explorer. The Latin specific epithet of taxifolia is from Latin taxus, meaning 'yew', and folium, meaning 'leaf': i.e., 'yew-leaved'. Both the genus and the species were first described and published in Bull. Torrey Bot. Club Vol.20 on pages 67-68 in 1893.
