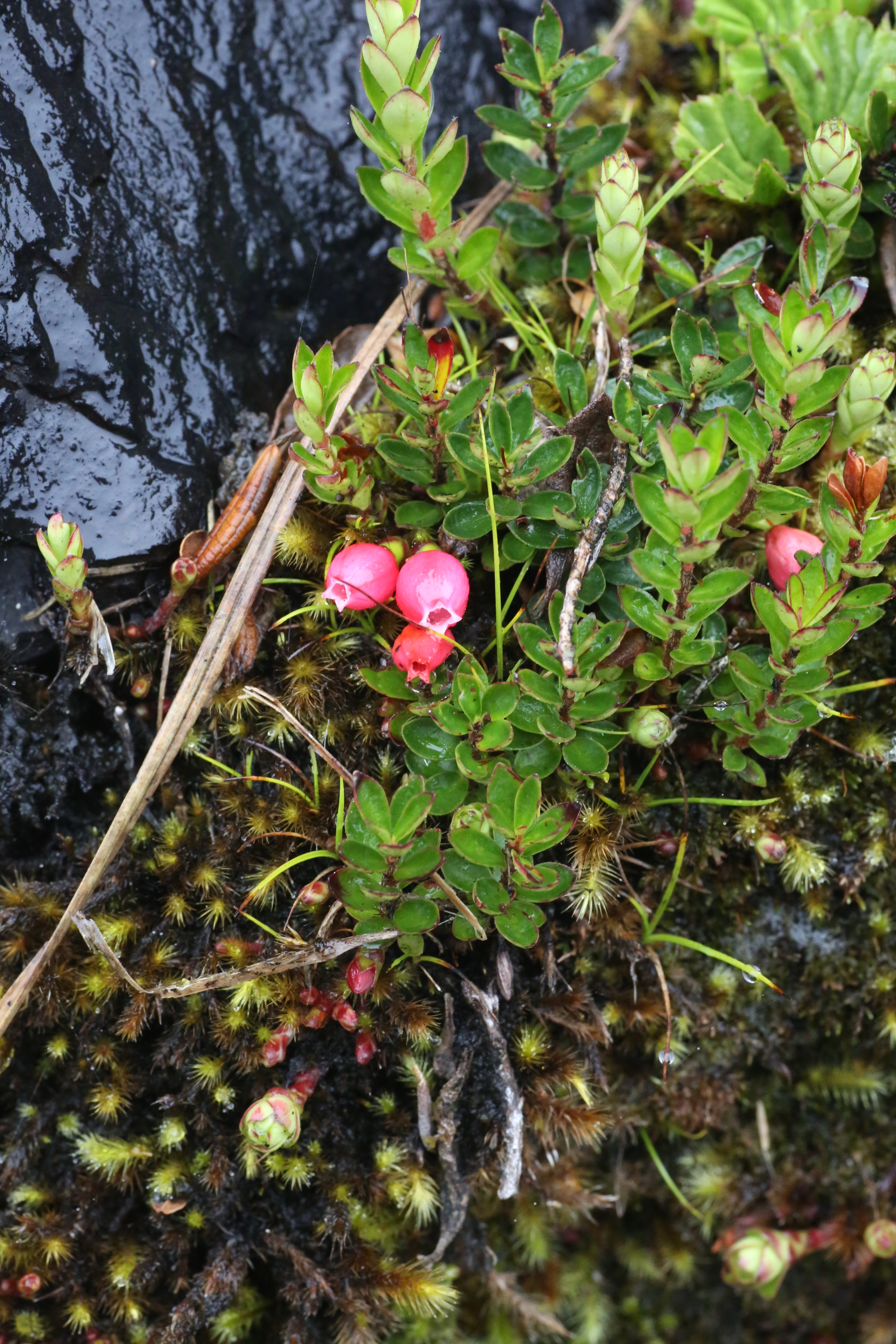
- Disterigma empetrifolium

Scientific classification
- Kingdom: Plantae
- Clade: Tracheophytes
- Clade: Angiosperms
- Clade: Eudicots
- Clade: Asterids
- Order: Ericales
- Family: Ericaceae
- Genus: Disterigma (Klotzsch) Nied.

= Disterigma =

Genus of plants

Disterigma is a genus of flowering plants belonging to the family Ericaceae, sometimes referred to as the neotropical blueberries, native to Mexico and Central America as well as Bolivia, Colombia, Ecuador and Perú. These shrubs have adapted to thrive within montane cloud forests and páramos (high-altitude wet 'tundra' habitats), usually above 2,000 m (6,561') above sea level.

Species:

- Disterigma acuminatum (Kunth) Nied.
- Disterigma agathosmoides (Wedd.) Nied.
- Disterigma alaternoides (Kunth) Nied.
- Disterigma appendiculatum Pedraza
- Disterigma baguense Pedraza
- Disterigma balslevii Luteyn
- Disterigma bracteatum Luteyn
- Disterigma campanulatum Pedraza
- Disterigma campii A.C.Sm.
- Disterigma chocoanum Pedraza
- Disterigma codonanthum S.F.Blake
- Disterigma cryptocalyx A.C.Sm.
- Disterigma dumontii Luteyn
- Disterigma ecuadorense Luteyn
- Disterigma empetrifolium (Kunth) Nied.
- Disterigma fortunense Wilbur
- Disterigma hammelii Wilbur & Luteyn
- Disterigma hiatum Pedraza
- Disterigma humboldtii (Klotzsch) Nied.
- Disterigma leucanthum A.C.Sm.
- Disterigma luteynii Wilbur
- Disterigma micranthum A.C.Sm.
- Disterigma noyesiae Luteyn
- Disterigma ollacheum Pedraza
- Disterigma ovatum (Rusby) S.F.Blake
- Disterigma panamense Standl.
- Disterigma parallelinerve Pedraza
- Disterigma pentandrum S.F.Blake
- Disterigma pernettyoides (Griseb. ex Wedd.) Nied.
- Disterigma pilosum Wilbur
- Disterigma pseudokillipiella Luteyn
- Disterigma rimbachii (A.C.Sm.) Luteyn
- Disterigma staphelioides (Planch. ex Wedd.) Nied.
- Disterigma stereophyllum (A.C.Sm.) Luteyn
- Disterigma synanthum Pedraza
- Disterigma trimerum Wilbur & Luteyn
- Disterigma ulei Sleumer
- Disterigma utleyorum Wilbur & Luteyn
- Disterigma verruculatum Pedraza
- Disterigma weberbaueri Hoerold
