= Pellegrinia =

Scientific classification
- Kingdom: Plantae
- Clade: Tracheophytes
- Clade: Angiosperms
- Clade: Eudicots
- Clade: Asterids
- Order: Ericales
- Family: Ericaceae
- Genus: Pellegrinia; Sleumer

Genus of plants

Pellegrinia is a genus of flowering plants belonging to the family Ericaceae.

It is native to Colombia and Peru in western South America.

The genus name of Pellegrinia is in honour of François Pellegrin (1881–1965), a French botanist, who specialised in the plants of tropical Africa. It was first described and published in Notizbl. Bot. Gart. Berlin-Dahlem Vol.12 on page 287 in 1935.

== Known species ==
According to Kew:

- Pellegrinia coccinea (Hoerold) Sleumer
- Pellegrinia grandiflora (Ruiz & Pav.) Sleumer
- Pellegrinia harmsiana (Hoerold) Sleumer
- Pellegrinia hirsuta (Ruiz & Pav.) Sleumer
