= Polyclita =

Scientific classification
- Kingdom: Plantae
- Clade: Embryophytes
- Clade: Tracheophytes
- Clade: Angiosperms
- Clade: Eudicots
- Clade: Asterids
- Order: Ericales
- Family: Ericaceae
- Genus: Polyclita; A.C.Sm.

Synonyms
- Chupalon turbinatum Kuntze; Psammisia turbinata (Kuntze) K.Schum.; Thibaudia turbinata (Kuntze) Hoerold

Genus of flowering plants

Polyclita is a monotypic genus of flowering plants belonging to the family Ericaceae. It only contains one known species, Polyclita turbinata (Kuntze) A.C.Sm.

It is native to Bolivia.

The genus name of Polyclita is in honour of Polykleitos (c. 480 BC – end of the 5th century BC), a Greek sculptor of bronzes (copies of which probably persist as Roman marble statues). The Latin specific epithet of turbinata means shaped like a top, from turbineus. Both the genus and the species were first described and published in Bull. Torrey Bot. Club Vol.63 on page 314 in 1936.
