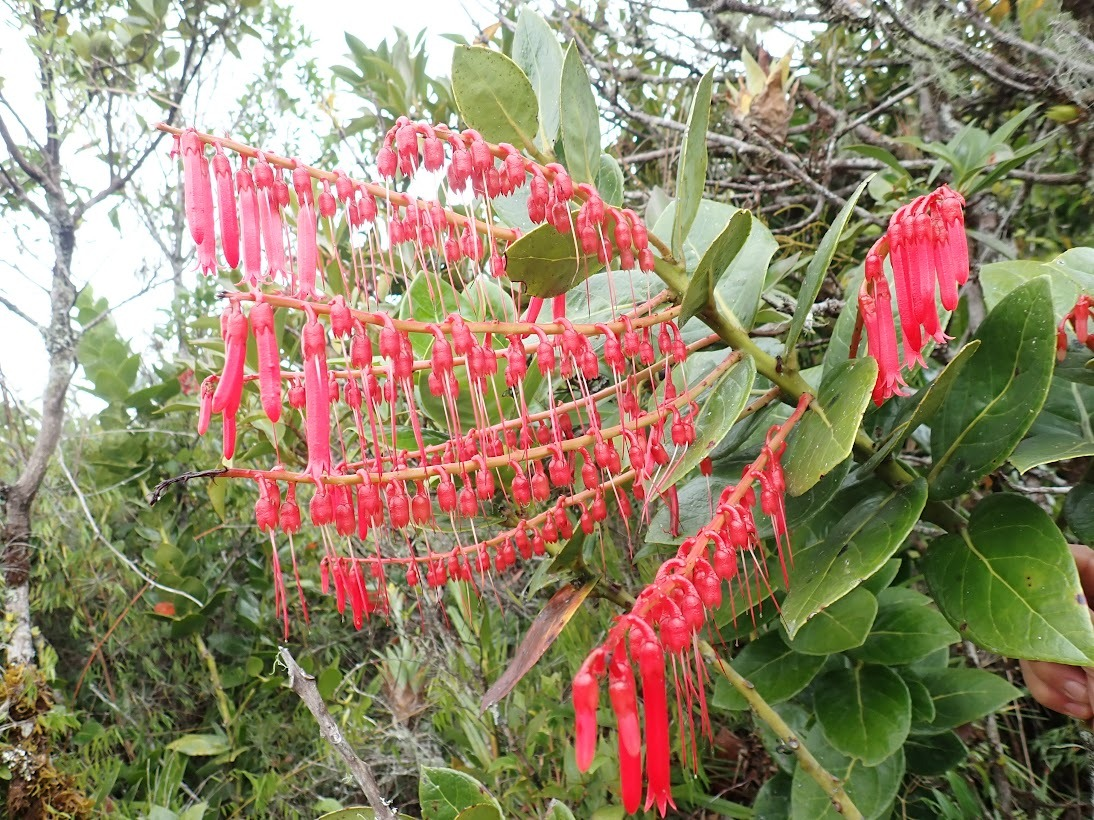
- Orthaea brachysiphon

Scientific classification
- Kingdom: Plantae
- Clade: Tracheophytes
- Clade: Angiosperms
- Clade: Eudicots
- Clade: Asterids
- Order: Ericales
- Family: Ericaceae
- Genus: Orthaea; Klotzsch

= Orthaea (plant) =

Genus of plants

Orthaea is a genus of flowering plants belonging to the family Ericaceae.

Its native range is southwestern Mexico to northern and western South America, Trinidad.

== Species ==
Species:

- Orthaea abbreviata Drake
- Orthaea apophysata (Griseb.) A.C.Sm.
- Orthaea boliviensis B.Fedtsch. & Basil.
- Orthaea brachysiphon (Sleumer) Luteyn
- Orthaea breviflora A.C.Sm.
- Orthaea bullata N.R.Salinas & Pedraza
- Orthaea carnosiflora N.R.Salinas & Pedraza
- Orthaea caudata (A.C.Sm.) Luteyn
- Orthaea cavendishioides A.C.Sm.
- Orthaea constans A.C.Sm.
- Orthaea cordata Oliv.
- Orthaea coriacea Luteyn
- Orthaea crinita A.C.Sm.
- Orthaea ecuadorensis Luteyn
- Orthaea ferreyrae A.C.Sm.
- Orthaea fimbriata Luteyn
- Orthaea glandulifera Luteyn
- Orthaea hispida A.C.Sm.
- Orthaea ignea Sleumer
- Orthaea madidiensis Pedraza & Luteyn
- Orthaea medusula Pedraza
- Orthaea merumensis Maguire, Steyerm. & Luteyn
- Orthaea minor (A.C.Sm.) Luteyn
- Orthaea oedipus Luteyn
- Orthaea oriens Luteyn
- Orthaea panamensis (Luteyn & Wilbur) Luteyn
- Orthaea paniculata Luteyn
- Orthaea paruensis Maguire, Steyerm. & Luteyn
- Orthaea peregrina A.C.Sm.
- Orthaea pinnatinervia Mansf.
- Orthaea rusbyi Luteyn
- Orthaea secundiflora Klotzsch
- Orthaea stipitata (Luteyn) Luteyn
- Orthaea thibaudioides Maguire, Steyerm. & Luteyn
- Orthaea venamensis Maguire, Steyerm. & Luteyn
- Orthaea weberbaueri Hoerold
- Orthaea wurdackii Maguire, Steyerm. & Luteyn
