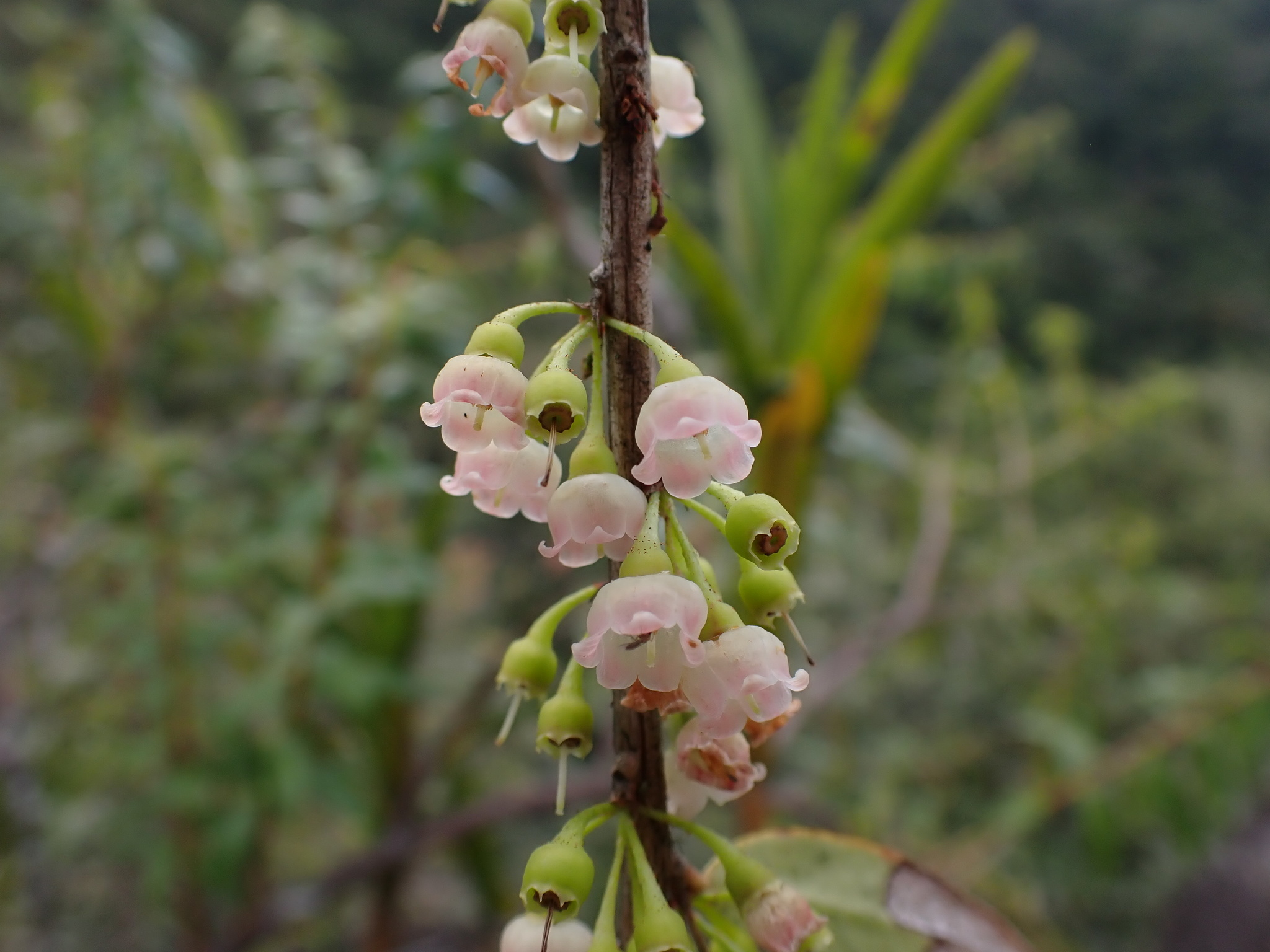
- Diogenesia Bolivian, one of the species of Diogenesia.

Scientific classification
- Kingdom: Plantae
- Clade: Tracheophytes
- Clade: Angiosperms
- Clade: Eudicots
- Clade: Asterids
- Order: Ericales
- Family: Ericaceae
- Genus: Diogenesia; Sleumer

= Diogenesia =

Genus of plants

Diogenesia is a genus of flowering plants belonging to the family Ericaceae.

Its native range is Western South America to Venezuela.

Species:

- Diogenesia alstoniana Sleumer
- Diogenesia amplectens (Sleumer) Sleumer
- Diogenesia andina (A.C.Sm.) Sleumer
- Diogenesia antioquiensis Luteyn
- Diogenesia boliviana (Britton) Sleumer
- Diogenesia caudata (Sleumer) Sleumer
- Diogenesia floribunda (A.C.Sm.) Sleumer
- Diogenesia gracilipes (A.C.Sm.) Sleumer
- Diogenesia laxa (A.C.Sm.) Sleumer
- Diogenesia octandra Sleumer
- Diogenesia oligantha (A.C.Sm.) Sleumer
- Diogenesia racemosa (Herzog) Sleumer
- Diogenesia tetrandra (A.C.Sm.) Sleumer
- Diogenesia vargasiana Sleumer
