= Themistoclesia =

Scientific classification
- Kingdom: Plantae
- Clade: Tracheophytes
- Clade: Angiosperms
- Clade: Eudicots
- Clade: Asterids
- Order: Ericales
- Family: Ericaceae
- Genus: Themistoclesia; Klotzsch

Synonyms
- Episcopia Moritz ex Klotzsch

Genus of flowering plants

Themistoclesia is a genus of flowering plants belonging to the family Ericaceae.

Its native range is western parts of South America and it is found in Bolivia, Colombia, Costa Rica, Ecuador, Panamá, Peru and Venezuela.

The genus name of Themistoclesia is in honour of Themistocles (c. 525 BC – c. 459 BC), an Athenian politician and military leader. It was first described and published in Linnaea Vol.24 on page 41 in 1851.

== Known species ==
According to Kew:

- Themistoclesia alata Luteyn
- Themistoclesia anfracta (A.C.Sm.) Sleumer
- Themistoclesia campii A.C.Sm.
- Themistoclesia compacta A.C.Sm.
- Themistoclesia compta A.C.Sm.
- Themistoclesia crassifolia Sleumer
- Themistoclesia cremasta A.C.Sm.
- Themistoclesia cuatrecasasii A.C.Sm.
- Themistoclesia dependens (Benth.) A.C.Sm.
- Themistoclesia diazii Pedraza
- Themistoclesia dryanderae Sleumer
- Themistoclesia epiphytica A.C.Sm.
- Themistoclesia flexuosa Luteyn
- Themistoclesia fosbergii A.C.Sm.
- Themistoclesia geniculata Pedraza
- Themistoclesia hirsuta A.C.Sm.
- Themistoclesia horquetensis Luteyn & Wilbur
- Themistoclesia idiocalyx Pedraza
- Themistoclesia inflata A.C.Sm.
- Themistoclesia mucronata (Benth.) Sleumer
- Themistoclesia orientalis Luteyn
- Themistoclesia pariensis Luteyn
- Themistoclesia pennellii (A.C.Sm.) Sleumer
- Themistoclesia pentandra Sleumer
- Themistoclesia peruviana A.C.Sm.
- Themistoclesia recondita A.C.Sm.
- Themistoclesia recurva A.C.Sm.
- Themistoclesia rostrata A.C.Sm.
- Themistoclesia siranensis Luteyn & Pedraza
- Themistoclesia smithiana (Standl.) Sleumer
- Themistoclesia tunquiniensis Pedraza & Luteyn
- Themistoclesia unduavensis Luteyn
- Themistoclesia vegasana A.C.Sm.
- Themistoclesia woytkowskii Luteyn & Pedraza
