= Oreanthes =

Scientific classification
- Kingdom: Plantae
- Clade: Tracheophytes
- Clade: Angiosperms
- Clade: Eudicots
- Clade: Asterids
- Order: Ericales
- Family: Ericaceae
- Genus: Oreanthes; Benth.

Genus of plants

Oreanthes is a genus of flowering plants belonging to the family Ericaceae.

Its native range is Ecuador.

== Species ==
Species:

- Oreanthes buxifolius Benth.
- Oreanthes ecuadorensis Luteyn
- Oreanthes fragilis (A.C.Sm.) Luteyn
- Oreanthes glandulifer A.C.Sm.
- Oreanthes hypogaeus (A.C.Sm.) Luteyn
- Oreanthes rotundifolius Luteyn
- Oreanthes sperlingii Luteyn
