= Anthopteropsis =

Scientific classification
- Kingdom: Plantae
- Clade: Tracheophytes
- Clade: Angiosperms
- Clade: Eudicots
- Clade: Asterids
- Order: Ericales
- Family: Ericaceae
- Genus: Anthopteropsis; A.C.Sm.

Genus of flowering plants

Anthopteropsis is a genus of flowering plants belonging to the family Ericaceae.

Its native range is Central America.

Species:

- Anthopteropsis insignis A.C.Sm.
