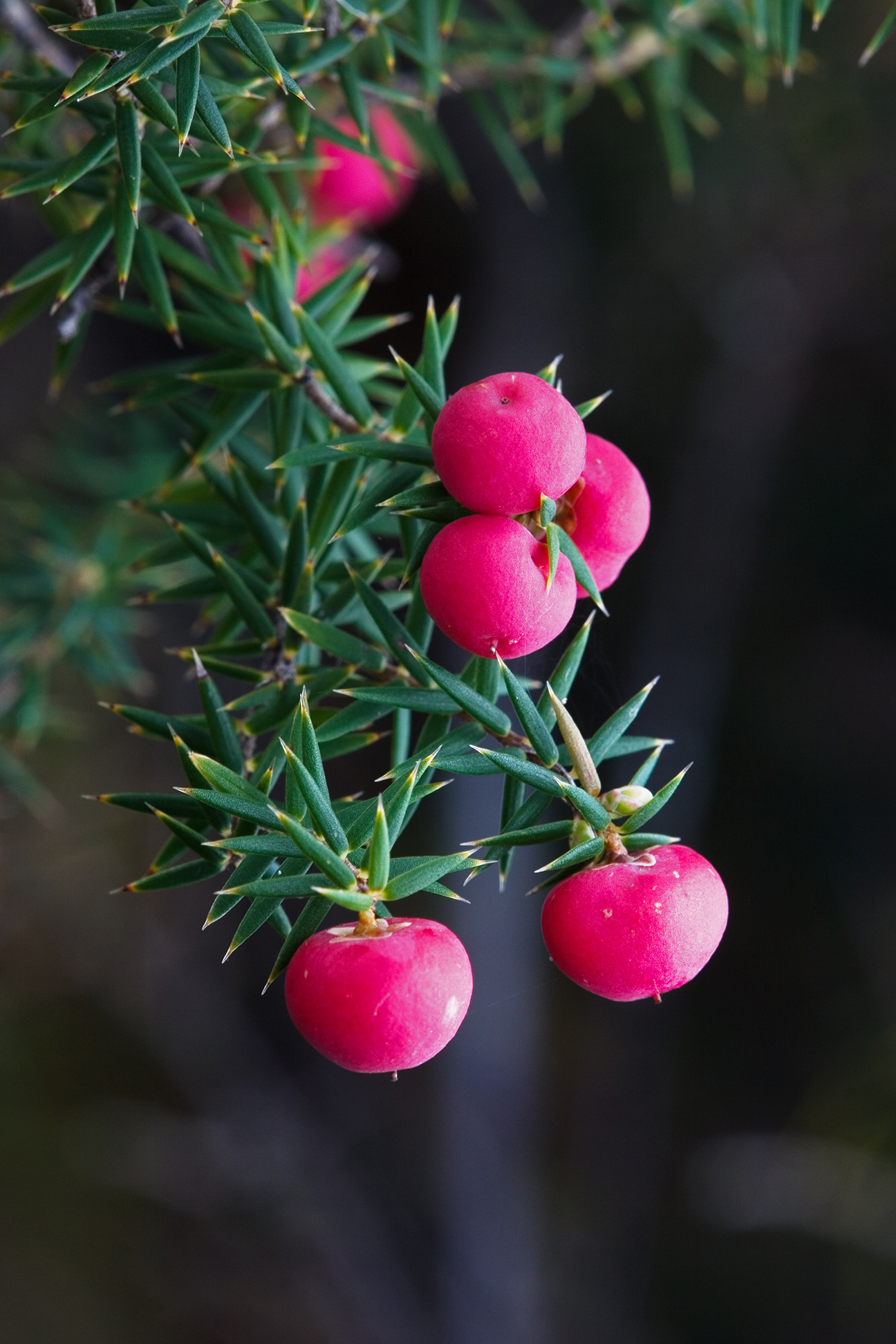
- Leptecophylla juniperina

Scientific classification
- Kingdom: Plantae
- Clade: Embryophytes
- Clade: Tracheophytes
- Clade: Angiosperms
- Clade: Eudicots
- Clade: Asterids
- Order: Ericales
- Family: Ericaceae; Juss.

Type genus
- Erica L.

Subfamilies
- Enkianthoideae; Pyroloideae; Monotropoideae; Arbutoideae; Cassiopoideae; Ericoideae; Harrimanelloideae; Epacridoideae (Styphelioideae); Vaccinioideae

Diversity
- Over 120 genera

= Ericaceae =

Heather family of flowering plants

The Ericaceae (/ˌɛrɪˈkeɪsi.aɪ, -iː/) are a family of flowering plants, commonly known as the heath or heather family, found most commonly in acidic and infertile growing conditions. The family is large, with about 4,250 known species spread across 124 genera, making it the 14th most speciose family of flowering plants. The many well known and economically important members of the Ericaceae include the cranberry, blueberry, huckleberry, rhododendron (including azaleas), and various common heaths and heathers (e.g. Erica, Cassiope, Daboecia, and Calluna).

== Description ==
The Ericaceae contain a morphologically diverse range of taxa, including herbs, dwarf shrubs, shrubs, and trees. Their leaves are usually evergreen, alternate or whorled, simple and without stipules. Their flowers are hermaphrodite and show considerable variability. The petals are often fused (sympetalous) with shapes ranging from narrowly tubular to funnel-form or widely urn-shaped. The corollas are usually radially symmetrical (actinomorphic) and urn-shaped, but many flowers of the genus Rhododendron are somewhat bilaterally symmetrical (zygomorphic). Anthers open by pores.

== Taxonomy ==
Michel Adanson used the term Vaccinia to describe a similar family, but Antoine Laurent de Jussieu first used the term Ericaceae. The name comes from the type genus Erica, which appears to be derived from the Greek word ereíkē (ἐρείκη). The exact meaning is difficult to interpret, but some sources show it as meaning 'heather'. The name may have been used informally to refer to the plants before Linnaean times, and simply been formalised when Linnaeus described Erica in 1753, and then again when Jussieu described the Ericaceae in 1789.

Historically, the Ericaceae included both subfamilies and tribes. In 1971, Stevens, who outlined the history from 1876 and in some instances 1839, recognised six subfamilies (Rhododendroideae, Ericoideae, Vaccinioideae, Pyroloideae, Monotropoideae, and Wittsteinioideae), and further subdivided four of the subfamilies into tribes, the Rhododendroideae having seven tribes (Bejarieae, Rhodoreae, Cladothamneae, Epigaeae, Phyllodoceae, and Diplarcheae). Within tribe Rhodoreae, five genera were described, Rhododendron L. (including Azalea L. pro parte), Therorhodion Small, Ledum L., Tsusiophyllum Max., Menziesia J. E. Smith, that were eventually transferred into Rhododendron, along with Diplarche from the monogeneric tribe Diplarcheae.

In 2002, systematic research resulted in the inclusion of the formerly recognised families Empetraceae, Epacridaceae, Monotropaceae, Prionotaceae, and Pyrolaceae into the Ericaceae based on a combination of molecular, morphological, anatomical, and embryological data, analysed within a phylogenetic framework. The move significantly increased the morphological and geographical range found within the group. One possible classification of the resulting family includes 9 subfamilies, 126 genera, and about 4,000 species:

- Enkianthoideae Kron, Judd & Anderberg (one genus, 16 species)
- Pyroloideae Kosteltsky (4 genera, 40 species)
- Monotropoideae Arnott (10 genera, 15 species)
- Arbutoideae Niedenzu (up to six genera, about 80 species)
- Cassiopoideae Kron & Judd (one genus, 12 species)
- Ericoideae Link (19 genera, 1790 species)
- Harrimanelloideae Kron & Judd (one species)
- Epacridoideae Arn. (=Styphelioideae Sweet) (35 genera, 545 species)
- Vaccinioideae Arnott (50 genera, 1580 species)

=== Genera ===
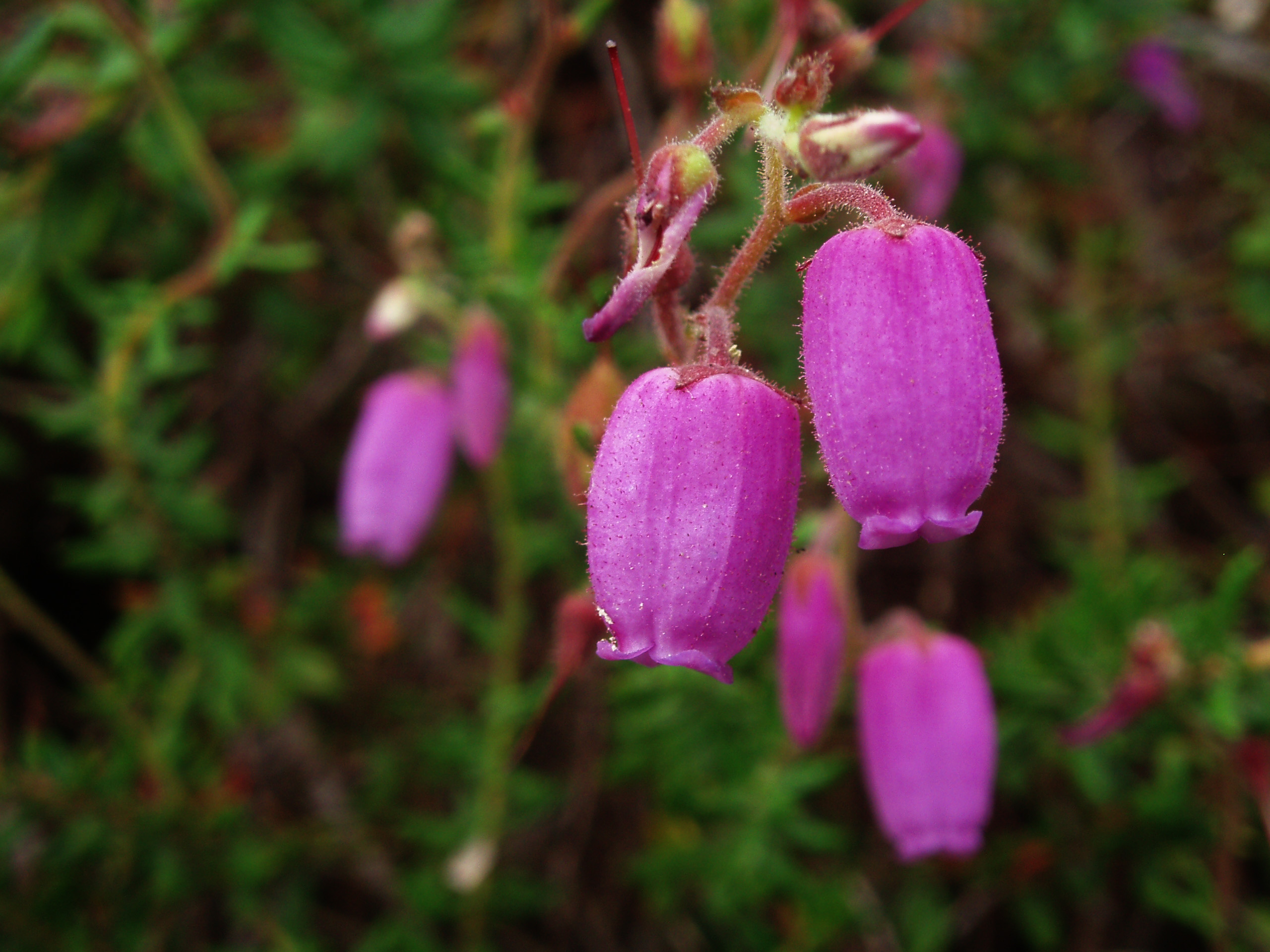
Flowers of Daboecia cantabrica, showing the typical fused, bell-shaped corolla

== Distribution and ecology ==
The Ericaceae have a nearly worldwide distribution. They are absent from continental Antarctica, parts of the high Arctic, central Greenland, northern and central Australia, and much of the lowland tropics and neotropics.

The family is largely composed of plants that can tolerate acidic, infertile, shady conditions. Due to their tolerance of acidic conditions, this plant family is also typical of peat bogs and blanket bogs; examples include Rhododendron groenlandicum and species in the genus Kalmia. In eastern North America, members of this family often grow in association with an oak canopy, in a habitat known as an oak–heath forest. Plants in Ericaceae, especially species in Vaccinium, rely on buzz pollination for successful pollination to occur.

The majority of ornamental species from Rhododendron are native to East Asia, but most varieties cultivated today are hybrids. Most rhododendrons grown in the United States are cultivated in the Pacific Northwest. The United States is the top producer of both blueberries and cranberries, with the state of Maine growing the majority of lowbush blueberry. The wide distribution of genera within Ericaceae has led to situations in which distinct American and European plants share the same common name, e.g. blueberry (Vaccinium corymbosum in North America and V. myrtillus in Europe) and cranberry (V. macrocarpon in America and V. oxycoccos in Europe).

=== Mycorrhizal relationships ===
Like other stress-tolerant plants, many Ericaceae have mycorrhizal fungi to assist with extracting nutrients from infertile soils, as well as evergreen foliage to conserve absorbed nutrients. This trait is not found in the Clethraceae and Cyrillaceae, the two families most closely related to the Ericaceae. Most Ericaceae (excluding the Monotropoideae, and some Epacridoideae) form a distinctive accumulation of mycorrhizae, in which fungi grow in and around the roots and provide the plant with nutrients. The Pyroloideae are mixotrophic and gain sugars from the mycorrhizae, as well as nutrients.

The cultivation of blueberries, cranberries, and wintergreen for their fruit and oils relies especially on these unique relationships with fungi, as a healthy mycorrhizal network in the soil helps the plants to resist environmental stresses that might otherwise damage crop yield. Ericoid mycorrhizae are responsible for a high rate of uptake of nitrogen, which causes naturally low levels of free nitrogen in ericoid soils. These mycorrhizal fungi may also increase the tolerance of Ericaceae to heavy metals in soil, and may cause plants to grow faster by producing phytohormones.

=== Heathlands ===
In many parts of the world, a "heath" or "heathland" is an environment characterised by an open dwarf-shrub community found on low-quality acidic soils, generally dominated by plants in Ericaceae. Heathlands are a broadly anthropogenic habitat, requiring regular grazing or burning to prevent succession. Heaths are particularly abundant – and constitute important cultural elements – in Norway, the United Kingdom, the Netherlands, Germany, Spain, Portugal, and other countries in Central and Western Europe. The most common examples of plants in Ericaceae which dominate heathlands are Calluna vulgaris, Erica cineria, Erica tetralix, and Vaccinium myrtillus.

In heathland, plants in Ericaceae serve as host plants to the butterfly Plebejus argus. Other insects, such as Saturnia pavonia, Myrmeleotettix maculatus, Metrioptera brachyptera, and Picromerus bidens are closely associated with heathland environments. Reptiles thrive in heaths due to an abundance of sunlight and prey, and birds hunt the insects and reptiles which are present.

Some evidence suggests eutrophic rainwater can convert ericoid heaths with species such as Erica tetralix to grasslands. Nitrogen is particularly suspect in this regard, and may be causing measurable changes to the distribution and abundance of some ericaceous species.

== Bibliography ==
- Stevens, P.F. (1971). "A classification of the Ericaceae: subfamilies and tribes". Botanical Journal of the Linnean Society. 64 (1): 1–53. doi:10.1111/j.1095-8339.1971.tb02133.x.
- Cafferty, Steve; Jarvis, Charles E. (November 2002). "Typification of Linnaean Plant Names in Ericaceae". Taxon. 51 (4): 751–753. Bibcode:2002Taxon..51..751.. doi:10.2307/1555030. JSTOR 1555030.
- Stevens, P.F.; Luteyn, J.; Oliver, E.G.H.; Bell, T.L.; Brown, E.A.; Crowden, R.K.; George, A.S.; Jordan, G.J.; Ladd, P.; Lemson, K.; McLean, C.B.; Menadue, Y.; Pate, J.S.; Stace, H.M.; Weiller, C.M. (2004). "Ericaceae". In Kubitzki, K. (ed.). Flowering Plants. Dicotyledons: Celastrales, Oxalidales, Rosales, Cornales, Ericales. The families and genera of vascular plants. Vol. 6. Springer. pp. 145–194. ISBN 9783540065128.
