= Leioproctus autumnalis =

Scientific classification
- Kingdom: Animalia
- Phylum: Arthropoda
- Clade: Pancrustacea
- Class: Insecta
- Order: Hymenoptera
- Family: Colletidae
- Genus: Leioproctus
- Species: L. autumnalis

Binomial name
- Leioproctus autumnalis Batley, 2025

Species of bee

Leioproctus autumnalis, or Leioproctus (Leioproctus) autumnalis, is a species of bee in the family Colletidae and subfamily Colletinae. It is endemic to Australia. It was described by entomologist Michael Batley in 2025.

== Etymology ==
The specific epithet autumnalis "refers to the apparent activity period for the species".

== Description ==
The holotype male body length is 7.0 mm, head width 2.3 mm; female body length 8.6 mm, head width 2.7 mm. Integumental colouration is mainly black with brown markings, the metasoma metallic blue. The hair is white to brown.

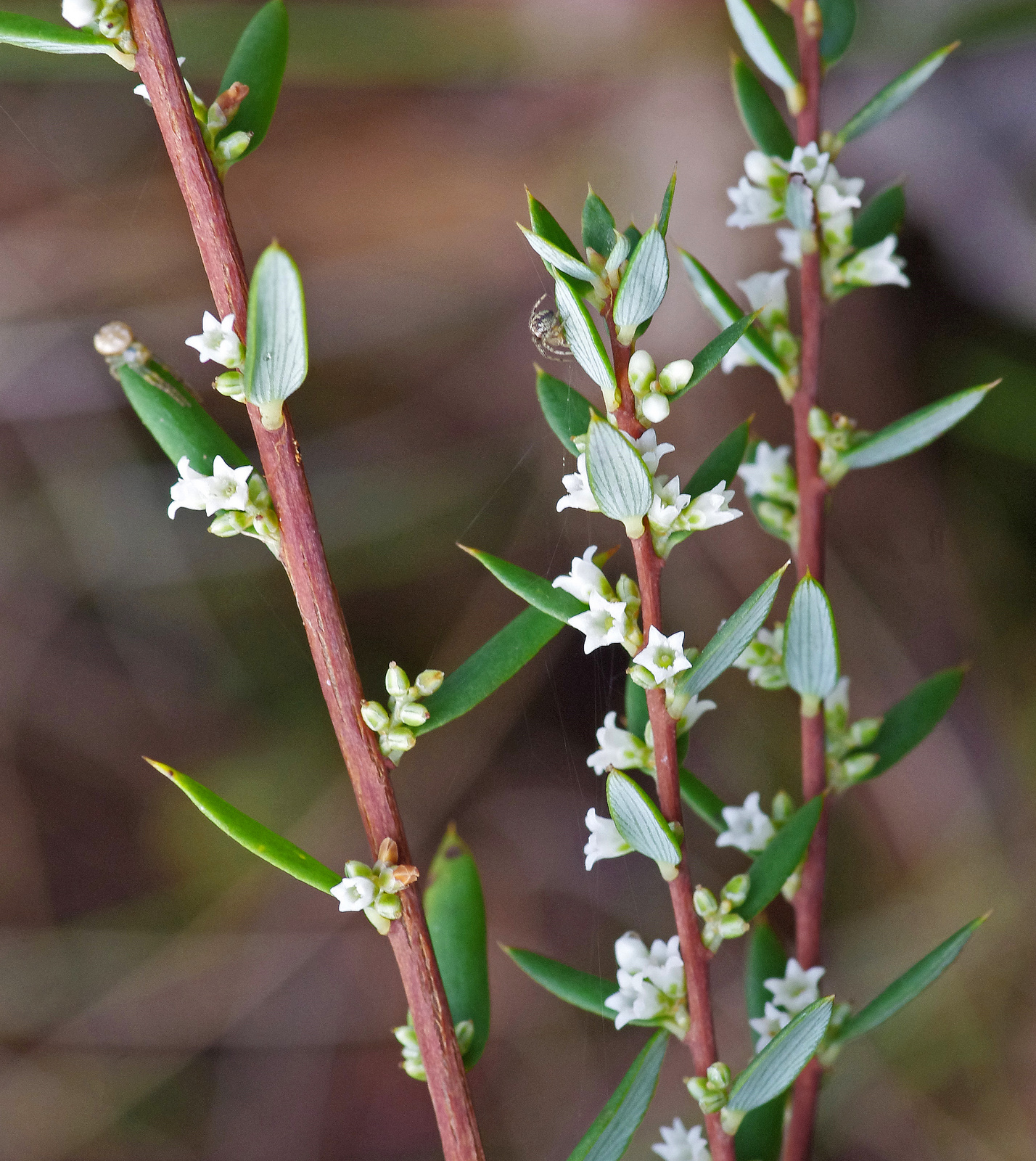
Flowers of Monotoca scoparia

== Distribution and habitat ==
The species occurs in eastern New South Wales. The type locality is Mellong Swamp in Wollemi National Park.

== Behaviour ==
The adults are flying mellivores. Flowering plants visited by the bees include Monotoca scoparia.

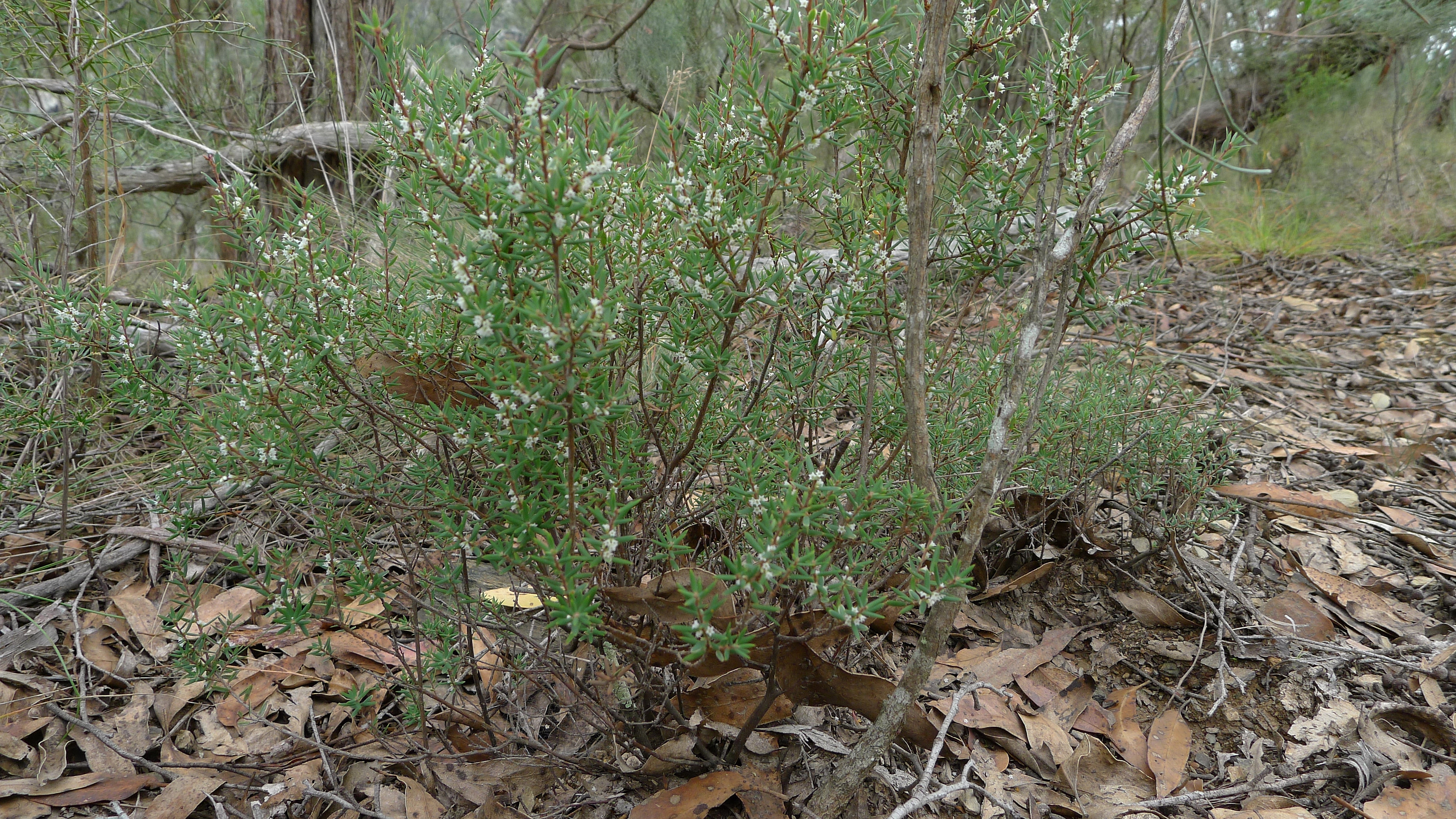
Monotoca scoparia (prickly broom heath), a forage plant of the bees
