= Monotoca oreophila =

Scientific classification
- Kingdom: Plantae
- Clade: Tracheophytes
- Clade: Angiosperms
- Clade: Eudicots
- Clade: Asterids
- Order: Ericales
- Family: Ericaceae
- Genus: Monotoca
- Species: M. oreophila

Binomial name
- Monotoca oreophila Albr.

Species of flowering plant

Monotoca oreophila, the mountain broom heath, is a plant in the family Ericaceae. It is endemic to Victoria, Australia. Plants grow to between 0.2 and 2.5 metres high. The elliptic or lanceolate leaves are 3.8 to 11 mm long and 1.4 to 2.8 mm wide. They are stiff, convex and pointed at the apex. The upper surface of the leaves is dark green while the underside is white with distinct veins. White flowers appear between November and January in the species' native range. These are followed by fruits that ripen to orange-red between January and April.

The species was formally described in 1995 based on plant material collected from the summit of Mount Wellington.

Plants of this species growing on Mount Useful were collected by Victorian Government botanist Ferdinand von Mueller and originally identified as Monotoca scoparia var. submutica in 1868. These are taller plants up to 2 metres high.
