= Monotoca glauca =

Scientific classification
- Kingdom: Plantae
- Clade: Tracheophytes
- Clade: Angiosperms
- Clade: Eudicots
- Clade: Asterids
- Order: Ericales
- Family: Ericaceae
- Genus: Monotoca
- Species: M. glauca

Binomial name
- Monotoca glauca (Labill.) Druce

Species of shrub

Monotoca glauca, known as goldy wood, is a heath family shrub endemic to Tasmania, Australia and is one of 17 described Monotoca species. It is a widespread and abundant understory species found on the margins of wet eucalypt forests and logged areas.

== Description ==
Monotoca glauca is an evergreen, densely branched shrub or small tree with slender branches, often 2–3 m tall. Leaves are similar to Cyathodes glauca, however are not in whorls. Venation tends to be spreading or palmate, characteristic of the genus. Leaves are elliptic with a point, and are usually 1.5 cm long, with a yellowish-green, glabrous adaxial surface, and glaucous abaxial surface. Flowers are pentamerous, white and solitary in auxiliary spikes. M. glauca is usually hermaphroditic or sometimes unisexual by abortion of pollen or ovules. The corolla tube is short with spreading lobes. Flowering occurs in January and February. Fruit is an ovoid drupe, green when mature and 3mm in diameter.

Monotoca elliptica is superficially very similar, but can be distinguished by its terminal spikes, and its leaves tend to be wider and less linear.

== Distribution and ecology ==
Monotoca glauca is a common understory shrub at the edges of wet eucalypt forests, mixed forest, buttongrass moorlands and in logged areas, found more commonly west of Tyler's Line.

Monotoca glauca is hardy to most frosts and light snowfalls, and tolerates moist, shady sites, and is susceptible to Phytophthora cinnamomi. It is phosphorus intolerant, but may be found on fertile, loam, poor and well drained soils.

== Etymology ==
Monotoca glauca was first formally described in 1805 by Jacques Labillardière who gave it the name Styphelia glauca. It was renamed by English botanist George Claridge Druce who gave it its current binomial name in 1917.

"Glauca" comes from the Greek word glaukos meaning “gleaming, silvery”. In botanical terms, glaucous refers to the greyish, bluish or whitish waxy coating or bloom that is easily rubbed off.

== Cultivation ==
Monotoca glauca is an ideal hedging plant, and may be grown from cuttings or seed but requires good drainage and part to full sun. Monotoca species are particularly difficult to germinate from seeds, and the Royal Tasmanian Botanical Gardens seedbank has been making a concerted effort to resolve germination requirements.
