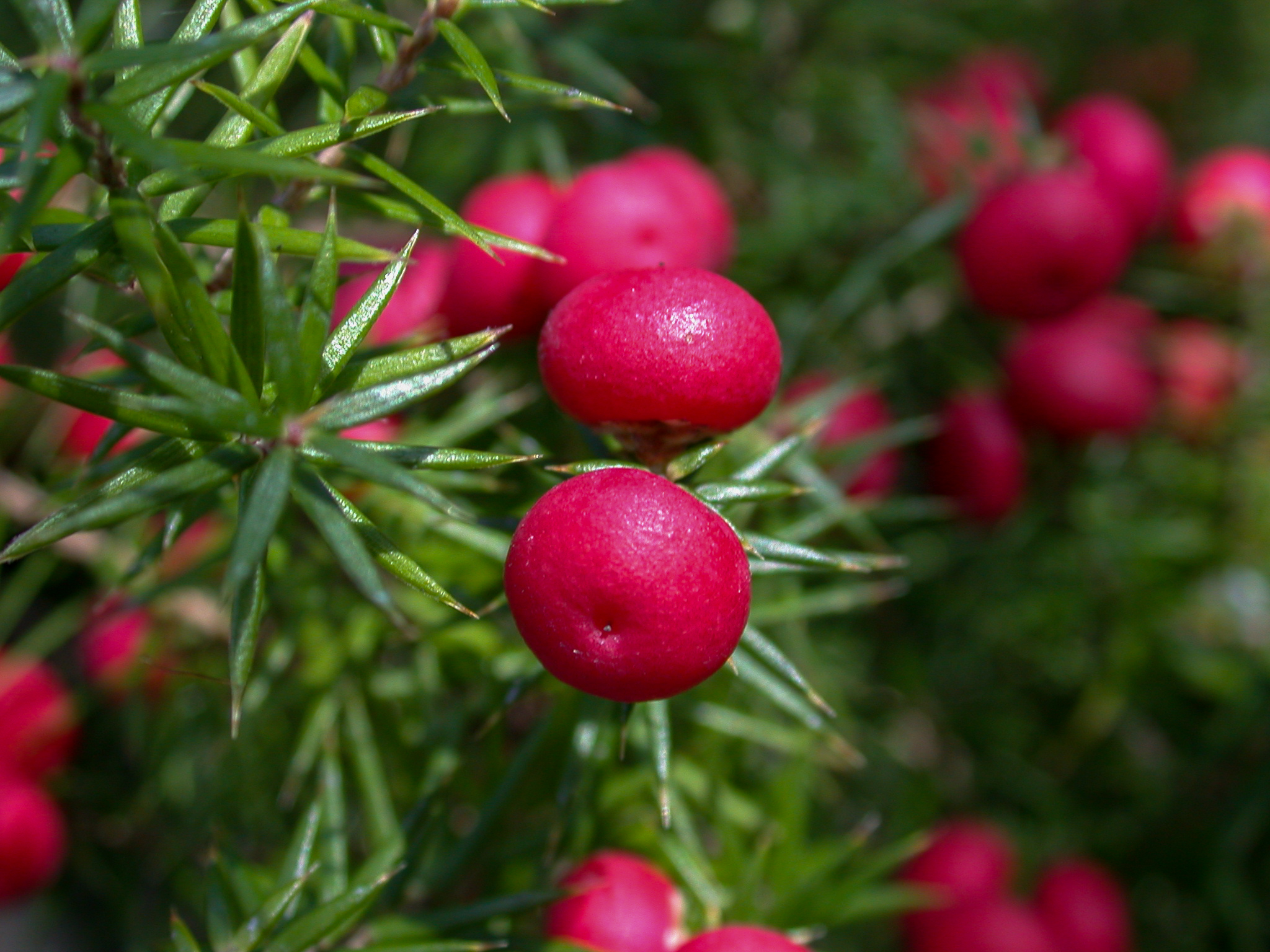

Scientific classification
- Kingdom: Plantae
- Clade: Tracheophytes
- Clade: Angiosperms
- Clade: Eudicots
- Clade: Asterids
- Order: Ericales
- Family: Ericaceae
- Genus: Leptecophylla
- Species: L. oxycedrus

Binomial name
- Leptecophylla oxycedrus (Labill.) Jarman
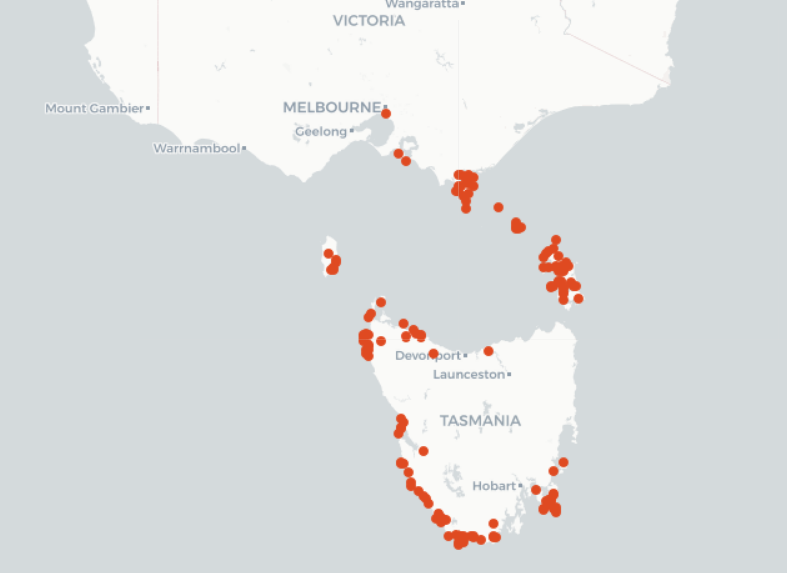
- Distribution of Leptecophylla oxycedrus

= Leptecophylla oxycedrus =

Australian shrub

Leptecophylla oxycedrus, commonly referred to as coastal pinkberry or crimson berry, is a medium shrub to large tree native to Tasmania and southern Victoria. It is part of the family Ericaceae and has narrow, pointed leaves, white flowers and pale pink fruits. It was previously classified as a subspecies of Leptecophylla juniperina but has since been raised to the specific level in 2017. The species was originally described in 1805 by Jacques Labillardière in Novae Hollandiae plantarum specimen which was published after his voyage through Oceania.

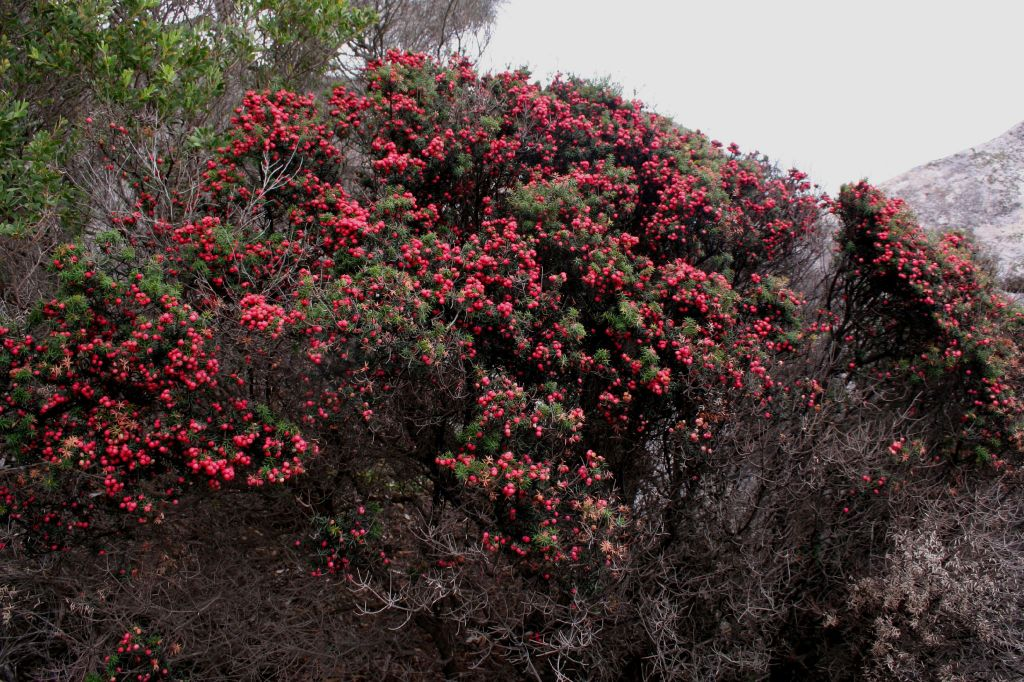
Photo of Leptecophylla oxycedrus shrub

== Description and habit ==
Leptecophylla oxycedrus is typically an erect, densely branched, woody shrub that grows 3–5 m (9.8–16.4 ft) in height and has puberulent branches. It is a perennial plant that typically flowers from August to November.

=== Leaves ===
The leaves of Leptecophylla oxycedrus are narrowly lanceolate and mucronate. They are reflexed with slightly curved, entire margins and are 6–16 mm (0.24–0.63 in) long and 1–1.7 mm (0.039–0.067 in) wide. They have a deep green, glabrous and glossy adaxial surface and a pale green abaxial surface. The abaxial surface has finely branched veins.

Leptecophylla oxycedrus has a single growth period every year when the leaves are produced. Before this season, the leaves are already formed in brown, scarious bracts. Each bract increases in size from the lowest ones to the first leaves that emerge, with the uppermost bracts being approximately the same length as the first leaves.

=== Flowers ===
Leptecophylla oxycedrus is a dioecious species and has dimorphic flowers. These flowers differ in that the male flowers have large, pollen-producing anthers which are usually partly exserted from the corolla tube, whereas the female flowers have small, empty anthers.

The flowers have either a terminal or axillary arrangement. The bract and bracteoles are ovate. The sepals are ovate-elliptic and are 1.8–3 mm (0.071–0.118 in) long. The corolla is white but differs in and between populations in regards to the presence of hair. Typically the corolla has sparse hairs on it while the inside is glabrous. The tube is cylindric-urceolate and are 2.2–2.8 mm (0.087–0.110 in) long in female flowers, but 2.6–4.4 mm (0.10–0.17 in) long in male flowers. The lobes are 1–2 mm (0.039–0.079 in) long and have acute recurved tips. The ovary contains 5-6 locules and the style is 1–1.5 mm (0.039–0.059 in) long.

=== Fruit ===
The fruit in this plant takes form as small spherical berries approximately 8–9 mm (0.31–0.35 in) in diameter and are pale to deep pink.

== Distribution and habitat ==
Leptecophylla oxycedrus is limited to coastal lowland areas. in wet Eucalypt forests or coastal scrub. It can be found in southern Victoria, the islands in the Bass Strait and in the coastal lowland areas of Tasmania. L. oxycedrus has been found up to 750m on Flinders Island but has only been found at elevations up to 400m on the Tasmanian mainland. L. oxycedrus has only been observed within 10km of the coast. In Victoria, L. oxycedrus is restricted to coastal granite communities at Wilsons Promontory, Corner Inlet and Cape Woolamai.

== Taxonomy and naming ==
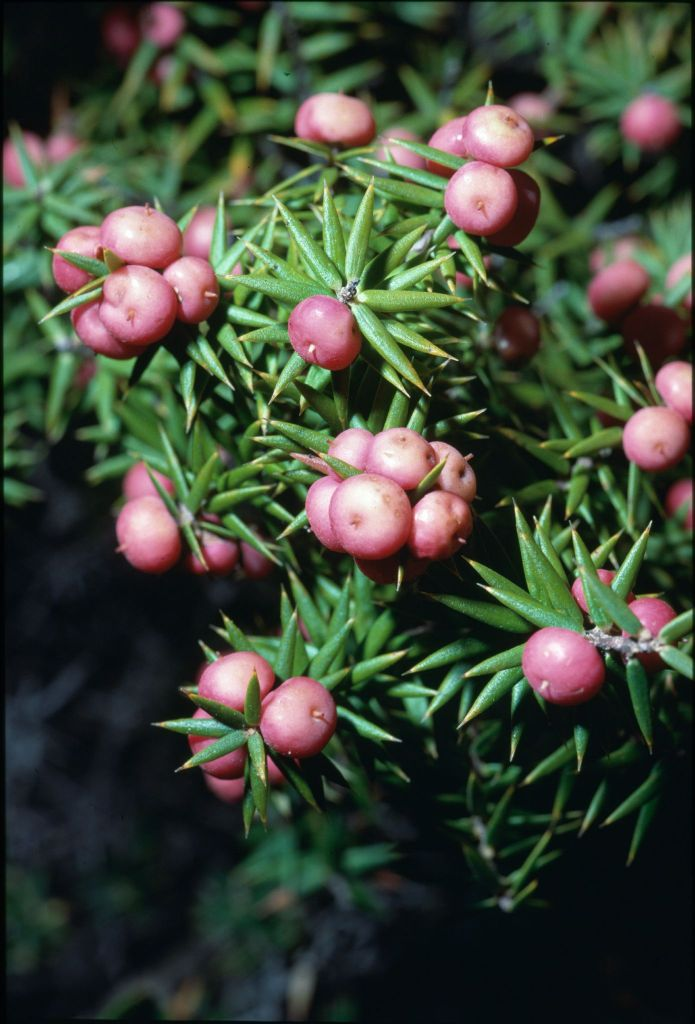
Leptecophylla oxycedrus berries

The current accepted name is Leptecophylla oxycedrus (Labill.) Jarman. Leptecophylla comes from the Greek lepteces meaning fine-pointed, and phyllum meaning leaf. The species name oxycedrus comes from the Greek oxycedros which means ‘prickly cedar’ (from the Greek oxys meaning sharp, and cedrus meaning cedar).

The correct classification has been heavily debated since its original description in 1805 by Labillardiere in his publication Novae Hollandiae plantarum specimen. The basionym for this species, which is outlined in this publication, was Styphelia oxycedrus Labill.

The following list details previous names or synonyms for Leptecophylla oxycedrus:

- Leptecophylla juniperina subsp. oxycedrus (Labill.) C.M. Weiller (1999)
- Cyathodes juniperina var. oxycedrus (Labill.) Allan (1961)
- Cyathodes acerosa var. oxycedrus (Labill.) Cheeseman (1906)
- Leucopogon oxycedrus (Labill.) Sond. (1845)
- Lissanthe oxycedrus (Labill.) Spreng. (1824)
- Cyathodes oxycedrus (Labill.) R.Br. (1810)
- Styphelia oxycedrus Labill. (1805)

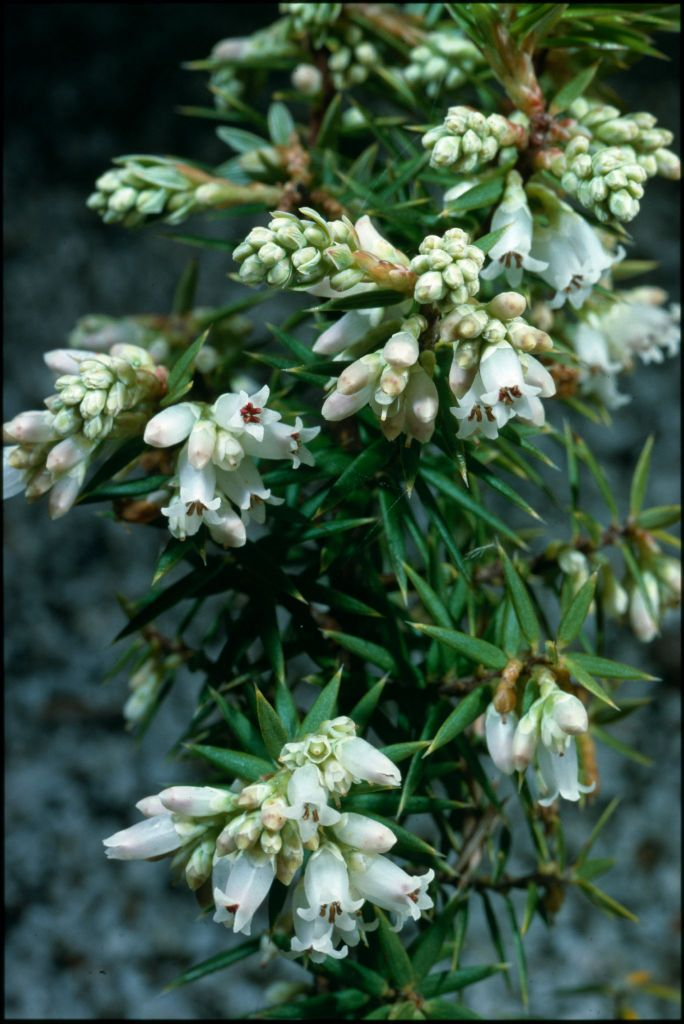
Leptecophylla oxycedrus flowers

== Similar species ==
Leptecophylla oxycedrus is visually similar to the two species that it was previously included alongside as subspecies: L. juniperina and L. parvifolia.

=== Leptecophylla juniperina ===
L. juniperina is now considered endemic to New Zealand. and so its distribution does not overlap with L. oxycedrus. It also differs in its leaf appearance, with L. juniperina having more linear leaves with longer pungent tips, and the major veins branch towards the lead apex more than L. oxycedrus.

=== Leptecophylla parvifolia ===
L. parvifolia, or pink mountain berry, also has a different distribution to L. oxycedrus, as it typically occurs in subalpine areas at elevations of 500-600m but can be found up to 1200m. It typically inhabits rocky slopes of hills and mountains. L. parvifolia is also smaller in height, usually growing to less than 2m. It has smaller flowers, with smaller lobes compared to the tube and the leaves are shorter and narrower than in L. oxycedrus.

== Conservation ==
Leptecophylla oxycedrus has been described as critically endangered in Victoria, but have no risk in other regions.

== Uses ==
The berries produced by this species are edible both raw and cooked.
