= Fletcherana insularis =

Scientific classification
- Kingdom: Animalia
- Phylum: Arthropoda
- Class: Insecta
- Order: Lepidoptera
- Family: Geometridae
- Genus: Fletcherana
- Species: F. insularis

Binomial name
- Fletcherana insularis (Butler, 1879)

Synonyms
- Larentia insularis Butler, 1879; Xanthorhoe insularis

Species of moth

Fletcherana insularis is a moth of the family Geometridae. It was first described by Arthur Gardiner Butler in 1879. It is endemic to the Hawaiian island of Maui. It has been found above the forest belt, high up on Haleakalā.

It is a variable species in size, color and pattern. It might be confused with Eupithecia monticolans which it somewhat resembles in color and markings, but the wing shape and course of the medial band and other markings are distinct.
