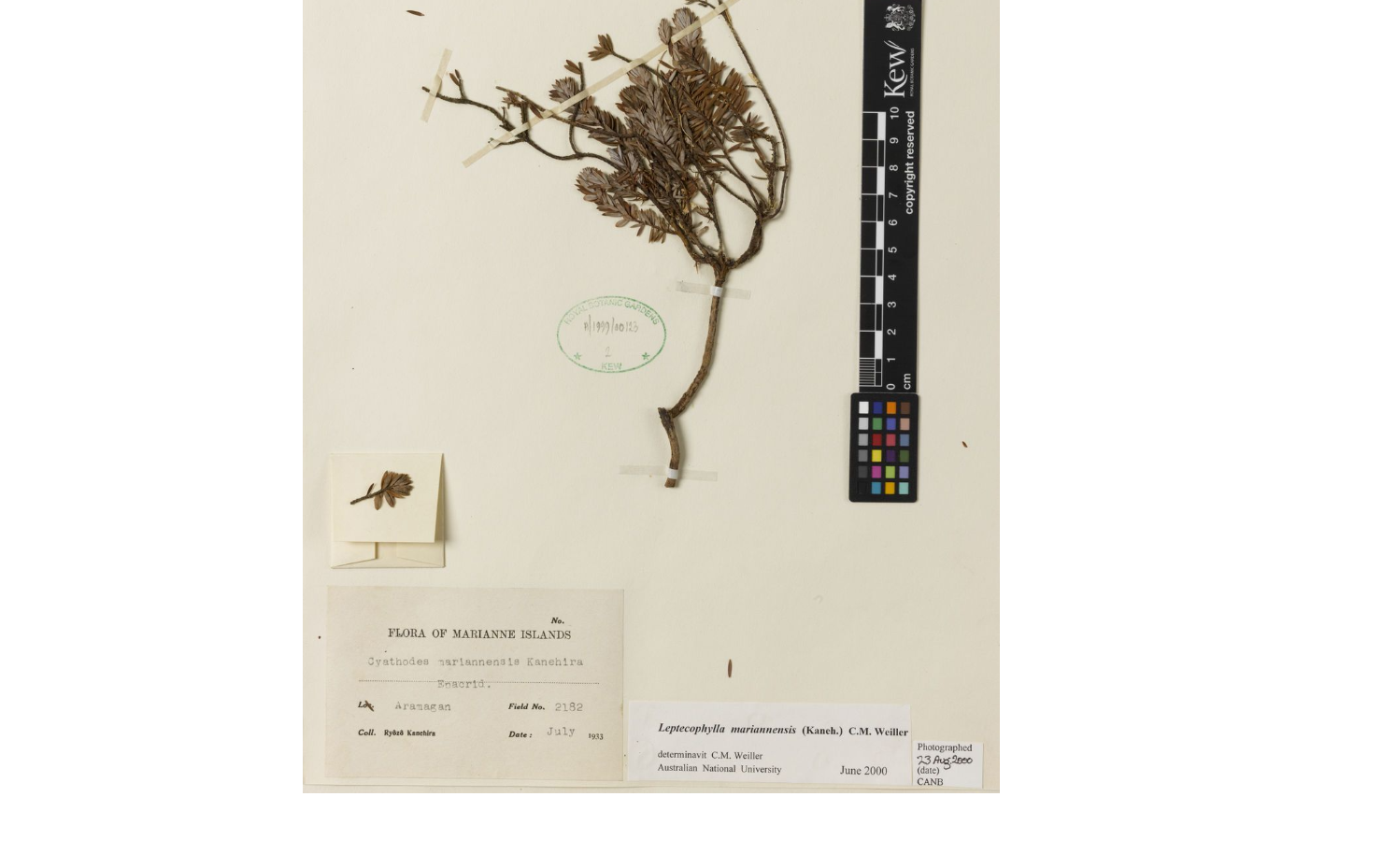
- Specimen from Alamagan, collected in 1933 by Ryōzō Kanehira.

Scientific classification
- Kingdom: Plantae
- Clade: Tracheophytes
- Clade: Angiosperms
- Clade: Eudicots
- Clade: Asterids
- Order: Ericales
- Family: Ericaceae
- Genus: Leptecophylla
- Species: L. mariannensis

Binomial name
- Leptecophylla mariannensis (Kaneh.) C.M.Weiller (1999)

Synonyms
- Cyathodes mariannensis Kaneh. (1934); Styphelia mariannensis (Kaneh.) Kaneh. & Hatus.

= Leptecophylla mariannensis =

Species of flowering plants

Leptecophylla mariannensis is a plant in the Ericaceae family (heath or heathers) and is only known to exist on the tiny island of Alamagan in the Mariana archipelago.

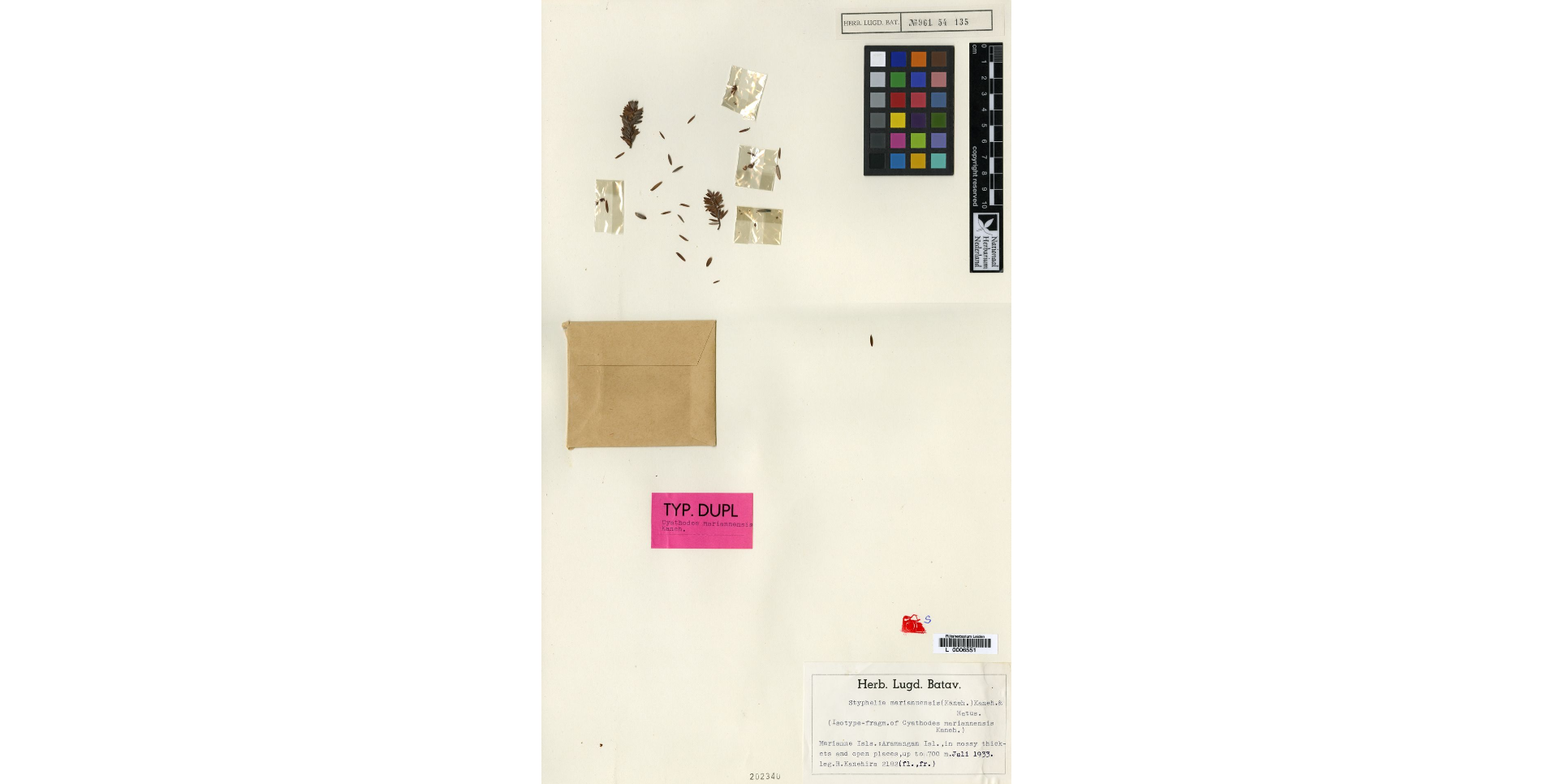
Leptecophylla mariannensis specimen, collected from Alamagan in 1933 by Kanehira.

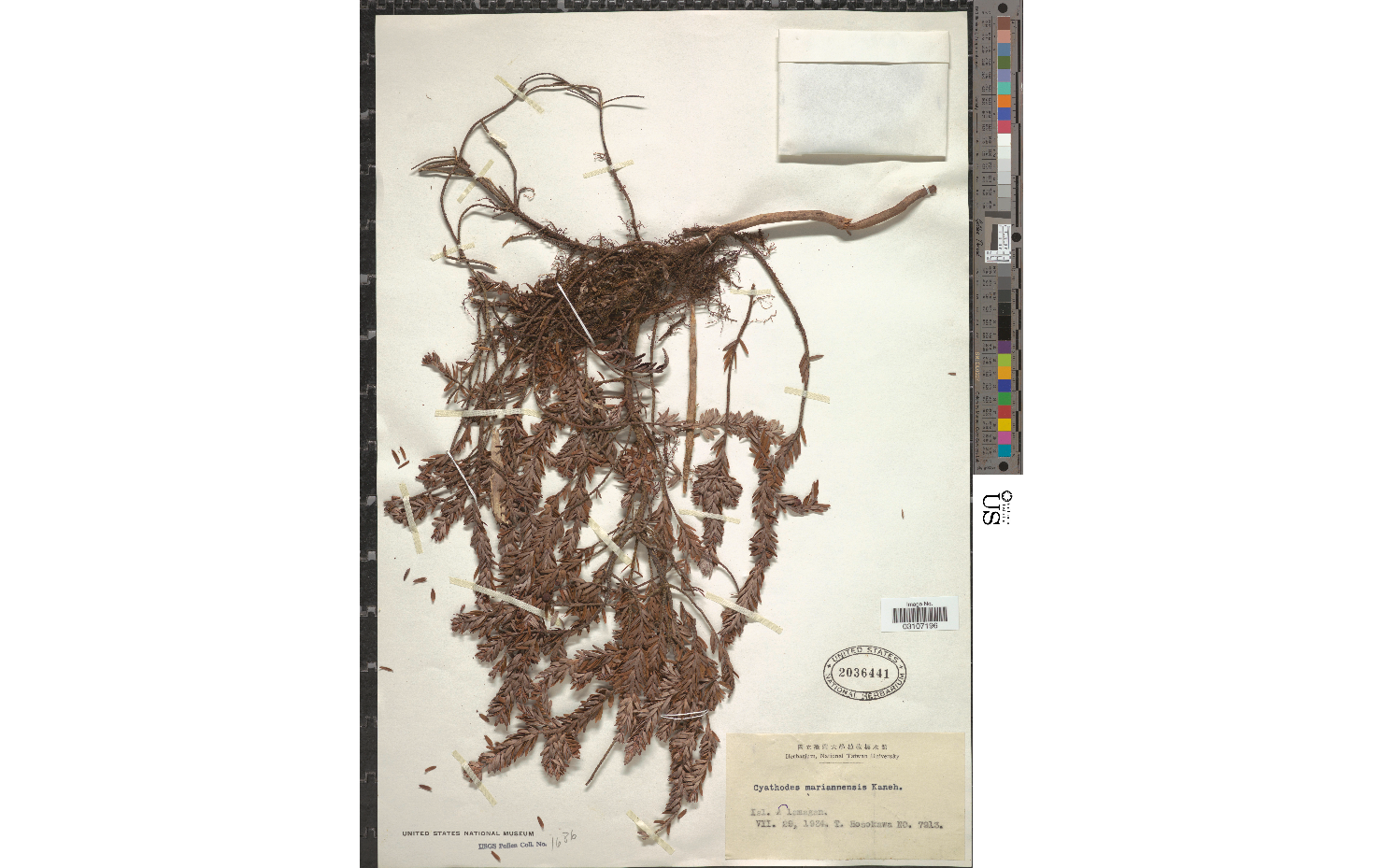
Leptecophylla mariannensis specimen from Alamagan, collected in 1934 by T. Hosokawa.

The species was first collected in 1933 by Japanese botanist, Ryōzō Kanehira, who described it in 1934 as Cyathodes mariannensis in The Botanical Magazine (Tokyo) (植物學雜誌, Shokubutsugaku zasshi). An isotype fragment, also collected in 1933, was named Styphelia mariannensis, and reportedly found in mossy thickets and open places up to 700 meters elevation. Another specimen was collected from Alamagan in 1934 by Japanese botanist, Takahide Hosokawa. The latest known observation of the plant was by P.J.R Hill in 1955. It was not recorded during the 2017 botanical survey of Alamagan by the CNMI Division of Fish & WIldlife.

In 1999, C.M. Weiller proposed that 12 species previously classified under the Cyathodes genus, including Cyathodes mariannensis, be reclassified to the new genus, Leptecophylla. However, a detailed examination and descriptive treatment of Leptecophylla mariannensis was not provided by the author. Leptecophylla mariannensis is now the accepted name of the species.

== See also ==
List of endemic plants in the Mariana Islands
