= Fletcherana leucoxyla =

Scientific classification
- Kingdom: Animalia
- Phylum: Arthropoda
- Class: Insecta
- Order: Lepidoptera
- Family: Geometridae
- Genus: Fletcherana
- Species: F. leucoxyla

Binomial name
- Fletcherana leucoxyla (Meyrick, 1899)

Synonyms
- Xanthorhoe leucoxyla Meyrick, 1899; Hydriomena leucoxyla

Species of moth

Fletcherana leucoxyla is a moth of the family Geometridae. It was first described by Edward Meyrick in 1899. It is endemic to the Hawaiian island of Kauai.

The background coloration is nearly white, while the intensity of the markings varies considerably.
