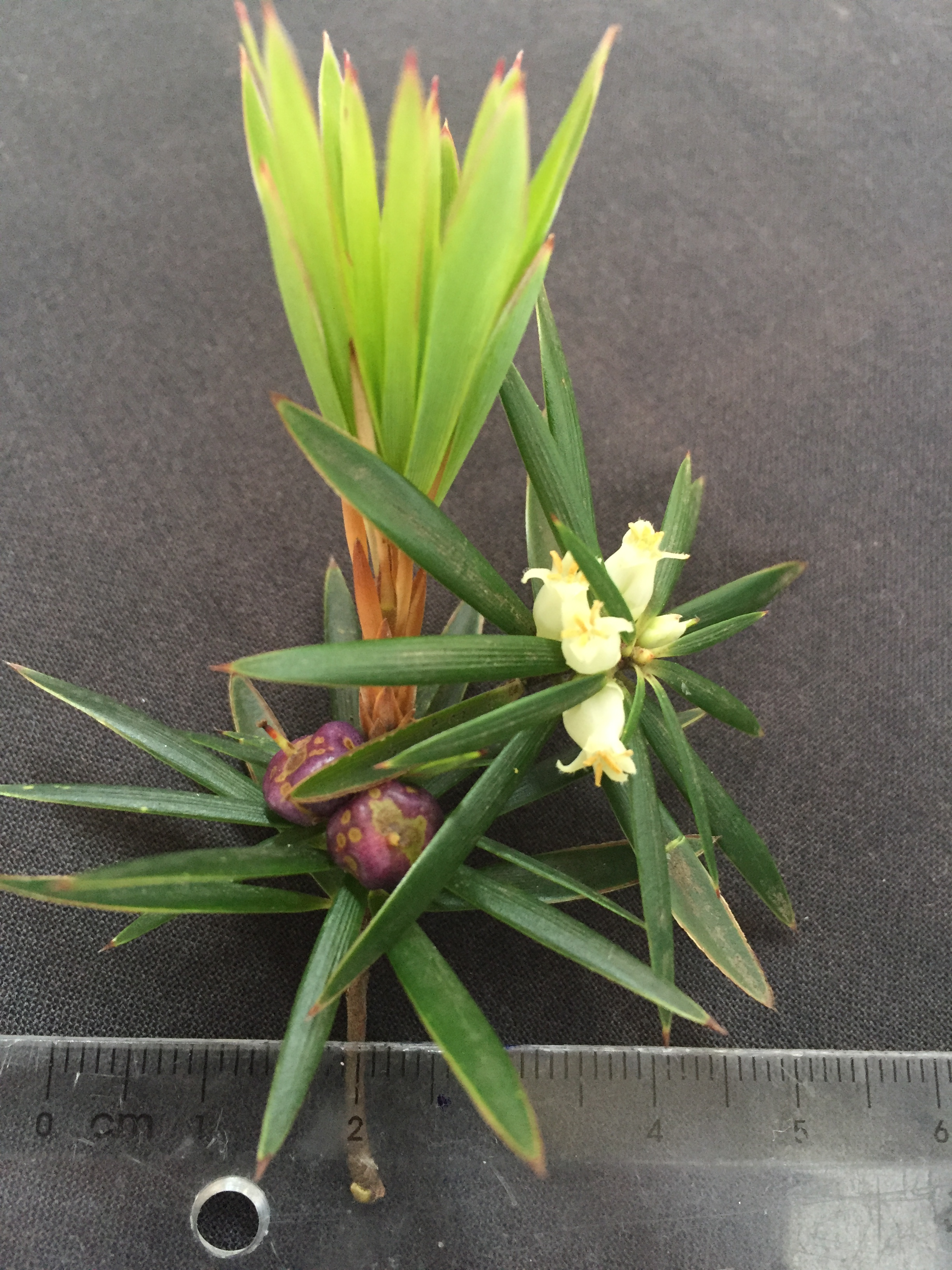

Scientific classification
- Kingdom: Plantae
- Clade: Tracheophytes
- Clade: Angiosperms
- Clade: Eudicots
- Clade: Asterids
- Order: Ericales
- Family: Ericaceae
- Genus: Cyathodes
- Species: C. glauca

Binomial name
- Cyathodes glauca Labill.

= Cyathodes glauca =

Species of tree

Cyathodes glauca, the purple cheeseberry, is a woody shrub or small tree common in Tasmania, Australia. It belongs to the heath family, Ericaceae. 'Heath' refers to open, shrub-like communities, which survive on well-drained and poor quality soils.

The genus name Cyathodes is in reference to the flower, describing it as 'cup-shaped'. The specific epithet glauca is 'glaucous', which means bluish-grey or green, referring to the distinguishable, lighter colour on the underside of the leaves.

== Description ==
The leaves of Cyathodes glauca are dark green, linear and pointed, 2–4 cm long. They have parallel venation and form false whorls, particularly towards the end of the stem. Undersides are distinctively glaucous.

Flowers are numerous, mostly terminal, and solitary in axils of final whorl. They are slightly scented, small (1 cm), white and tubular with recurved lobes and protruding anthers. Flowering occurs in spring and early summer.

The fruit is a distinctively pink-purple drupe, 1 cm in diameter. Its shape is that of a partially flattened tennis ball.

== Distribution ==
Cyathodes glauca is a widespread and locally common understorey plant in open forest below 1100m (subalpine). It is found almost only in Tasmania, Australia. It inhabits mostly subalpine, sclerophyll woodland or wet sclerophyll forest.

== Ecology ==
Common dominant species that Cyathodes glauca occurs with are Leptospermum scoparium, Pultenaea daphnoides, Monotoca glauca and Acacia species. Cyathodes glauca prefers moist, well-drained and poor quality soil. As a result, it is often found on rocky slopes and boulder fields where clay soils overlay dolerite. Slopes are typically of a southeast aspect with gentle to moderate gradient and good drainage.

== Affinities ==
There are three other known species within the genus Cyathodes. Cyathodes platystoma (a threatened species) has the largest leaves and is only found in wet sclerophyll forests of the Tasman Peninsula. C. straminea looks very similar to C. glauca although it has smaller leaves, dark red drupes and is only found above 1100m.

Other recognisable members of the family Ericaceae include blueberries, cranberries and rhododendrons.
