= Fletcherana roseata =

Scientific classification
- Kingdom: Animalia
- Phylum: Arthropoda
- Class: Insecta
- Order: Lepidoptera
- Family: Geometridae
- Genus: Fletcherana
- Species: F. roseata

Binomial name
- Fletcherana roseata (Swezey, 1913)

Synonyms
- Hydriomena roseata Swezey, 1913

Species of moth

Fletcherana roseata is a moth of the family Geometridae. It was first described by Otto Herman Swezey in 1913. It is endemic to the island of Hawaii.
