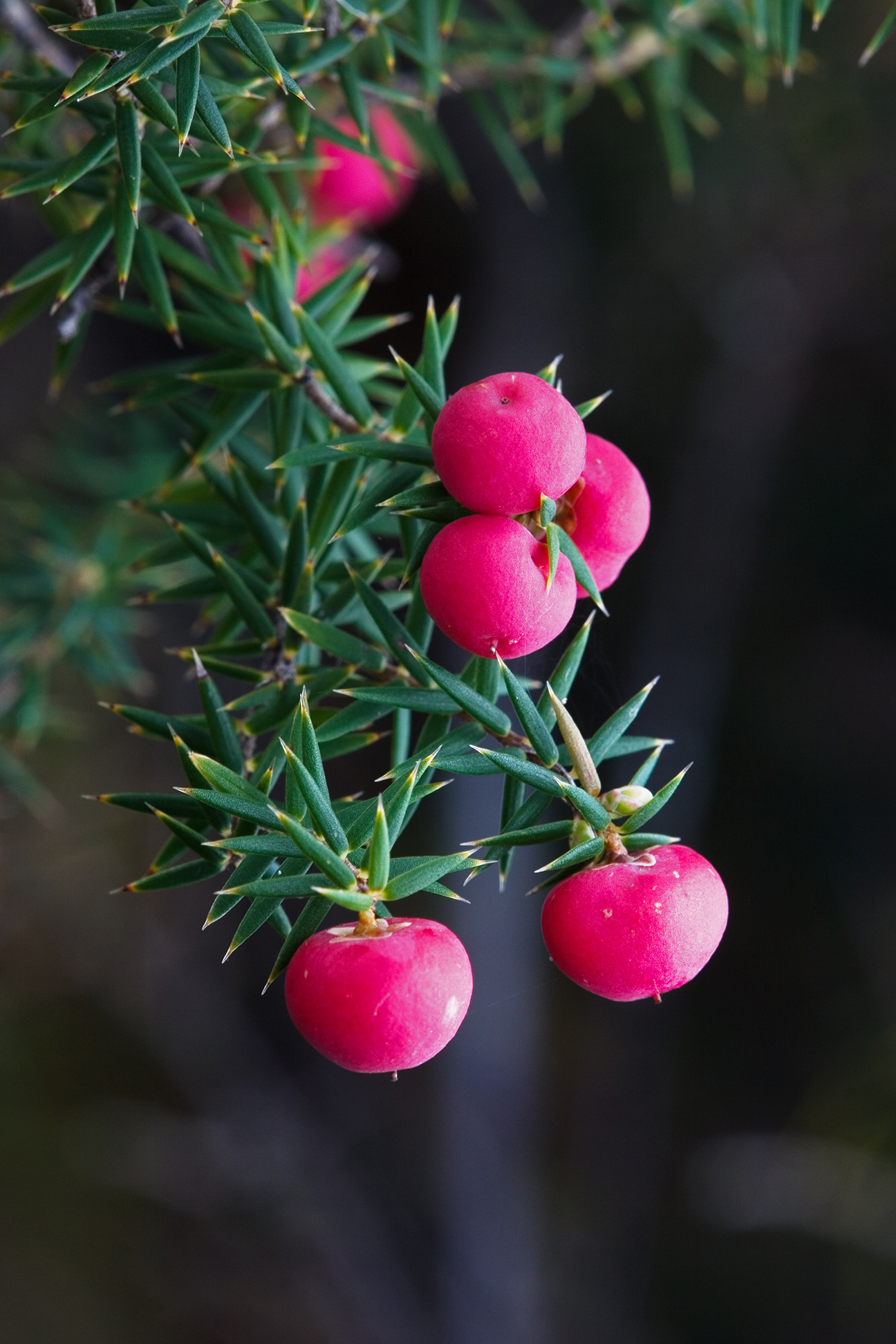
- Leptecophylla juniperina, Tasman Peninsula, Tasmania

Scientific classification
- Kingdom: Plantae
- Clade: Tracheophytes
- Clade: Angiosperms
- Clade: Eudicots
- Clade: Asterids
- Order: Ericales
- Family: Ericaceae
- Subfamily: Epacridoideae
- Tribe: Styphelieae
- Genus: Leptecophylla; C.M.Weiller

= Leptecophylla =

Genus of flowering plants

Leptecophylla is a genus of flowering plants in the Epacridaceae family, a subfamily of Ericaceae. The genus is native to southeastern Australia, New Zealand, Papua New Guinea and the Pacific Islands. Some species in this genus were formerly classified within the genera Cyathodes, Lissanthe, Styphelia and Trochocarpa.

The genus is a harder, erect shrub with small sharply pointed leaves and the distinguishable pink berries (although they are also found to be red or white). The plant's fruit is edible, raw or cooked. The genus can grow anywhere between 30 cm to 3 meters in height depending on the species.

== Species ==
As of August 2023, Plants of the World Online accepted 14 species:

- Leptecophylla abietina (Labill.) C.M.Weiller (Tasmania)
- Leptecophylla brassii (Sleumer) C.M.Weiller (Southeastern New Guinea)
- Leptecophylla brevistyla (J.W.Moore) C.M.Weiller (Society Islands)
- Leptecophylla divaricata (Hook.f.) C.M.Weiller (Tasmania)
- Leptecophylla juniperina (J.R.Forst. & G.Forst.) C.M.Weiller (New Zealand)
- Leptecophylla mariannensis (Kaneh.) C.M.Weiller (Marianas Islands)
- Leptecophylla oxycedrus (Labill.) Jarman (Southern Victoria, Tasmania)
- Leptecophylla parvifolia (R.Br.) Jarman (Tasmania)
- Leptecophylla pendulosa (Jarman) C.M.Weiller (Eastern Tasmania)
- Leptecophylla pogonocalyx C.M.Weiller (Tasmania)
- Leptecophylla pomarae (A.Gray) C.M.Weiller (Tahiti)
- Leptecophylla rapae (Sleumer) C.M.Weiller (Rapa Iti and Austral Islands)
- Leptecophylla robusta (Hook.f.) C.M.Weiller (Chatham Islands in New Zealand)
- Leptecophylla tameiameiae (Cham. & Schltdl.) C.M.Weiller (Hawaiian and Marquesas Islands)
