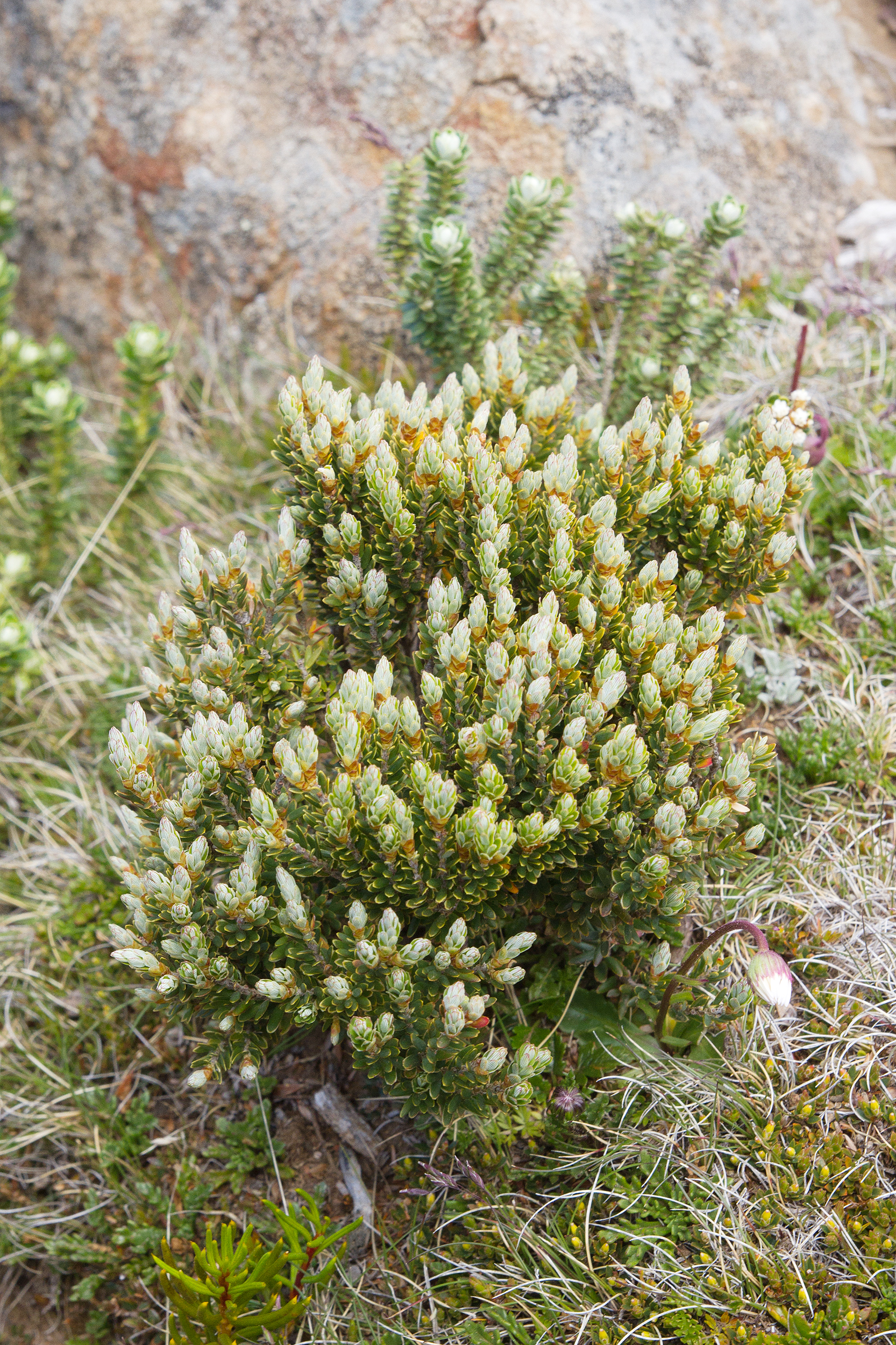
- Walls of Jerusalem National Park, Australia

Scientific classification
- Kingdom: Plantae
- Clade: Tracheophytes
- Clade: Angiosperms
- Clade: Eudicots
- Clade: Asterids
- Order: Ericales
- Family: Ericaceae
- Genus: Cyathodes
- Species: C. petiolaris

Binomial name
- Cyathodes petiolaris (DC.) Druce

= Cyathodes petiolaris =

Species of flowering plant

Cyathodes petiolaris is a small alpine plant in the family Ericaceae, found in Tasmania, Australia.
