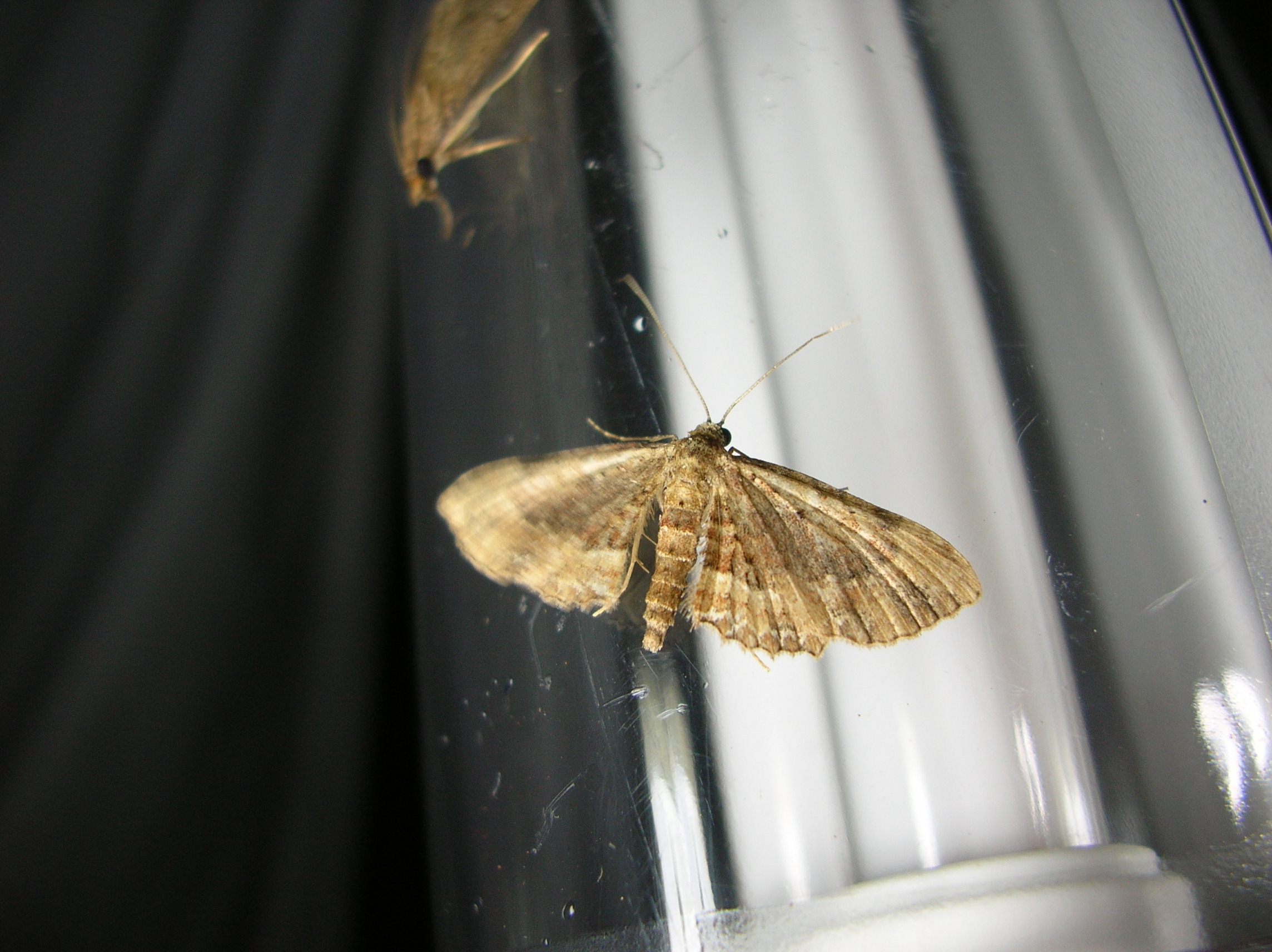

Scientific classification
- Kingdom: Animalia
- Phylum: Arthropoda
- Clade: Pancrustacea
- Class: Insecta
- Order: Lepidoptera
- Family: Geometridae
- Genus: Eupithecia
- Species: E. monticolens

Binomial name
- Eupithecia monticolens Butler, 1881

Synonyms
- Eupithecia monticolens Butler, 1881

= Eupithecia monticolens =

Species of moth

== Description ==
Eupithecia monticolens is a moth of the family Geometridae. It was first described by Arthur Gardiner Butler in 1881. It is endemic to the US in the Hawaiian islands of Kauai, Oahu, Molokai, Maui, Lanai and Hawaii.

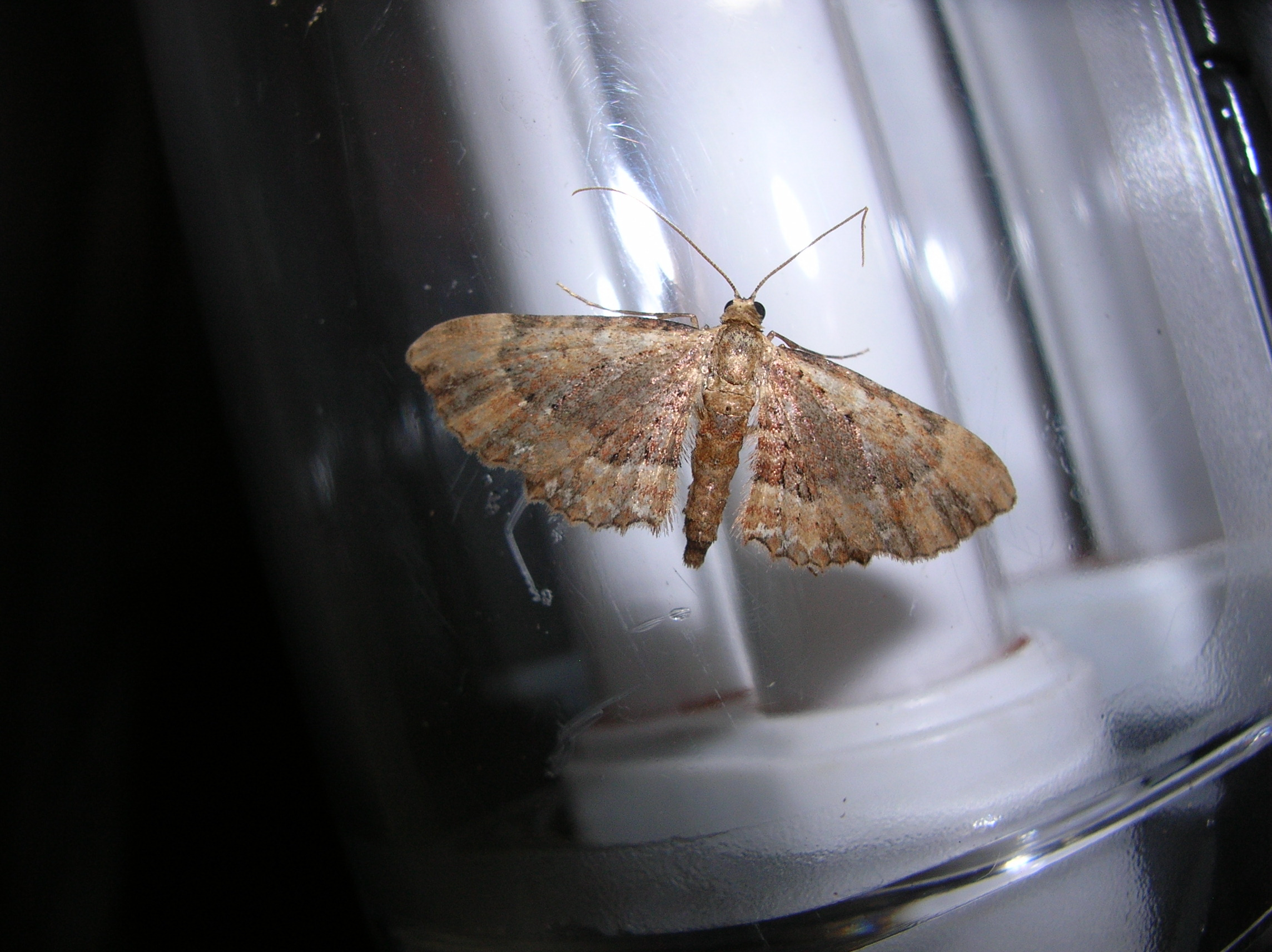

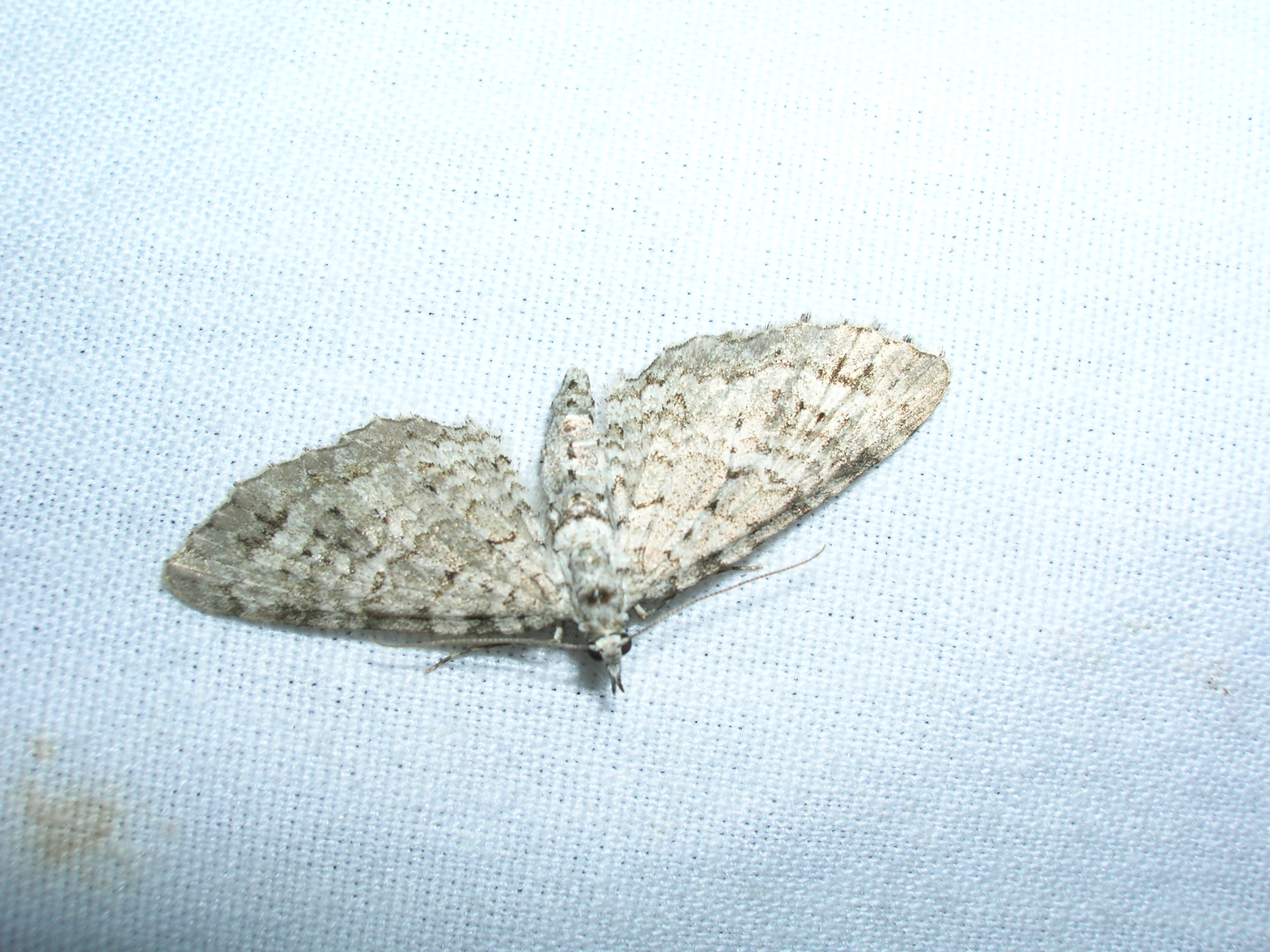

== Ecology ==
The larvae feed on Alphitonia ponderosa, Metrosideros, Pipturus, Railliardia and Styphelia tameiameiae.

== Etymology ==
The species name has sometimes been mis-written monticolans, but the suffix is correctly a Third-declension participle -colens for "inhabiting" as per the original spelling.
