= Fletcherana =

Scientific classification
- Kingdom: Animalia
- Phylum: Arthropoda
- Class: Insecta
- Order: Lepidoptera
- Family: Geometridae
- Subfamily: Larentiinae
- Genus: Fletcherana; Zimmerman, 1958

Genus of moths

Fletcherana is a genus of moths in the family Geometridae described by Zimmerman in 1958.

== Species ==
- Fletcherana giffardi (Swezey, 1913)
- Fletcherana insularis (Butler, 1879)
- Fletcherana leucoxyla (Meyrick, 1899)
- Fletcherana roseata (Swezey, 1913)
