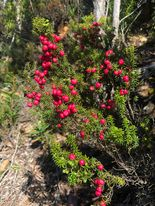
- On Kunanyi/Mt Wellington, Hobart, Tasmania.

Scientific classification
- Kingdom: Plantae
- Clade: Tracheophytes
- Clade: Angiosperms
- Clade: Eudicots
- Clade: Asterids
- Order: Ericales
- Family: Ericaceae
- Genus: Leptecophylla
- Species: L. parvifolia

Binomial name
- Leptecophylla parvifolia (R.Br.) Jarman

= Leptecophylla parvifolia =

Tasmanian endemic plant

Leptecophylla parvifolia, commonly known as the mountain pinkberry, is a small to medium sized species of shrub in the family Ericaceae that is endemic to the highlands of Tasmania. This species was first collected and documented in 1804 by Robert Brown and was formerly included in the Cythodes genus. It was then as noted as subspecies of Leptecophylla junipernia but in 2018, was classified as its own species.

== Habit ==
It grows as an erect, compact, and rounded shrub, typically wider than it is high. This species typically ranges in height from 50–150 cm, rarely exceeding 2 m. L. parvifolia is common in open eucalypt woodlands and within rainforest communities. It occurs throughout the southern, central and northeast highlands of Tasmania at altitudes above 500 metres and can form the dominant shrub layer in some locations (e.g. the Central Plateau). In the southeast, its primarily found on rocky dolerite slopes but also can occur on Carboniferous-Devonian rock types

== Description ==
The leaves of this species are small, hence the name 'parvifolia' which translates roughly to 'small leaves'. The leaves are alternately arranged and smaller than other Leptecophylla species, often <7mm, dark green in colour and pungent. They are linear-lanceolate while the margins are slightly recurved, the apex of the leaves comes to a sharp point. The abaxial surface is pale white and waxy which displays a distinct striate pattern. However, the venation is typically narrow palmate and gives the appearance of being parallel due to the curvature of the margins and small leaf size.

This species bares small, white, bell shaped flowers that are smaller than then that of the other species in this genus. It flowers from September to January and by late spring, has masses of small edible pink/red berries up to 8 mm in diameter

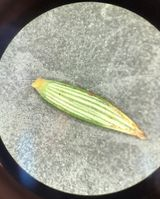
Abaxial surface of a leaf taken from the plant species Leptecophylla parvifolia showing the palmate venation pattern.
