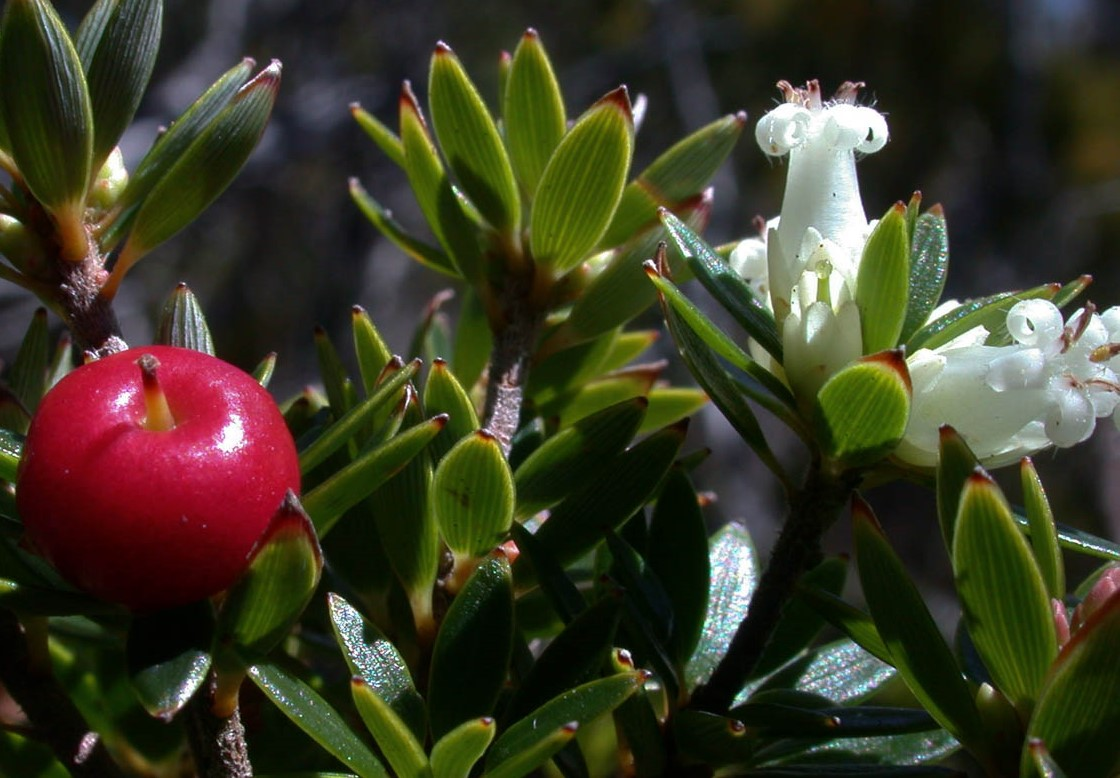

Scientific classification
- Kingdom: Plantae
- Clade: Tracheophytes
- Clade: Angiosperms
- Clade: Eudicots
- Clade: Asterids
- Order: Ericales
- Family: Ericaceae
- Genus: Cyathodes
- Species: C. straminea

Binomial name
- Cyathodes straminea R.Br.

= Cyathodes straminea =

Species of flowering plant

Cyathodes straminea, also known as false-whorled cheeseberry, is a species of flowering plant in the family Ericaceae endemic to Tasmania, where it grows as an alpine to subalpine shrub (15–60 cm in height) with a spreading habit. The generic name Cyathodes was derived from Greek "Cyath" = cup and "odes" = like, referring to the ovary encircled by cup-shaped nectary.

== Description ==
Cyathodes straminea is a shrub with leaves arranged in pseudowhorls. Leaves are obovate-elliptic 7–16 mm long, 3-4.5 mm wide, often with a membranous margin, and a soft, blunt point. The upper surface is glabrous, but the lower surface is covered in white wax (glaucous) with prominent parallel veins (Fig.1). Petiole 1.6-2.4 mm long. The flowers occur in summer in upper leaf axils (Fig.2) and have a strong cheesy smell, are white, bell-shaped and hermaphrodite (both male and female) with long corolla lobes and anthers exserted on thick filaments. They have 5-10 locules in the ovary, developing into red, rounded, flattened fruits to 8mm wide, reputed to be edible (raw or cooked) (Fig.3).

== Habitat ==
Cyathodes straminea grows frequently in open shrubby subalpine heathland and woodlands on the Dolerite mountains of the northern, central and eastern parts of Tasmania above 1000m. Usually found on medium and heavy (clay) soils in moist, rocky and windy sites, with well-drained conditions and is frost tolerant. Commonly associated with Eucalyptus coccifera, Orites revoluta, Helichrysum and Richea species.

== Cultivation ==
It requires a well-drained moist soil in a sheltered site. These plans are very susceptible to drought but can grow even in -7 °C. The seeds should be surface sown in ericaceous soil. It germinates within 1–2 months at 18 °C. Scarification will reduce the germination time and 2 or 3 periods of 4 – 6 weeks cold stratification, alternated with 4 weeks warm stratification can also help.

== Gallery ==
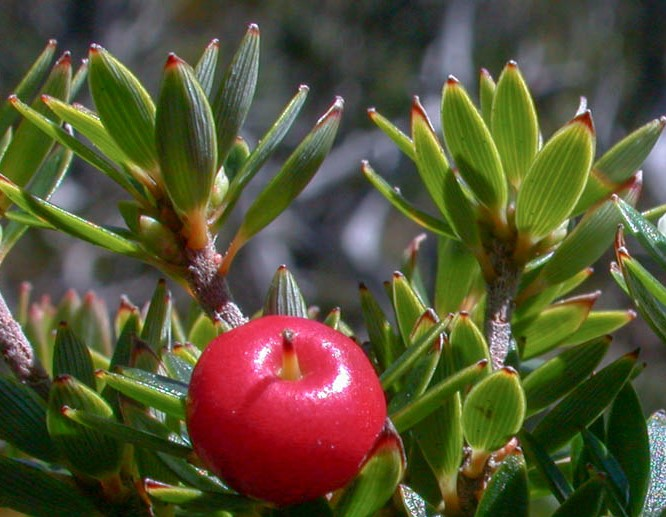
Leaves with a membranous margin and parallel venation beneath

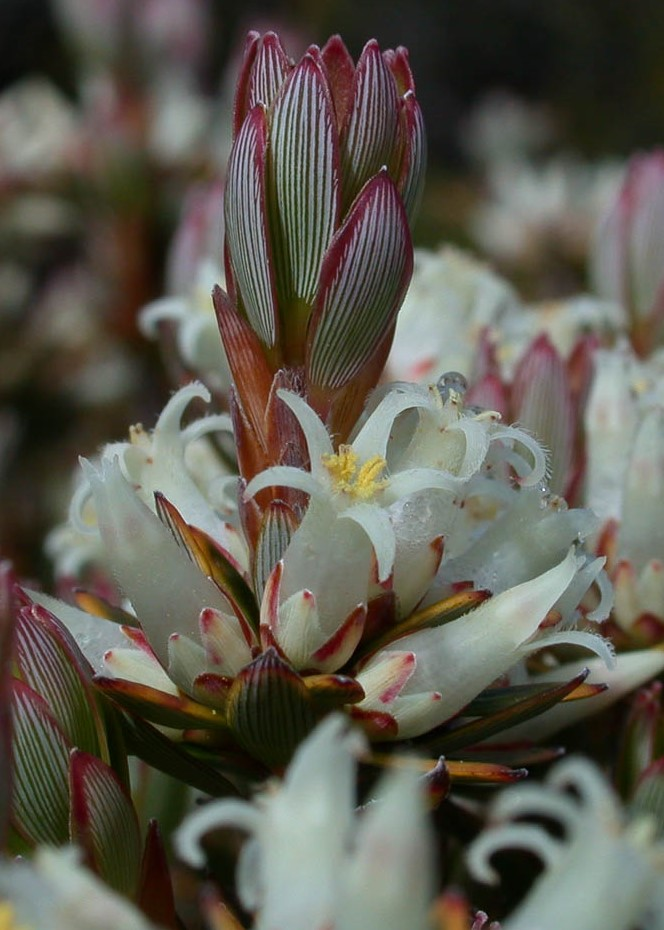
White tubular flowers in upper leaf axils. Note the glaucous undersides of the leaves.

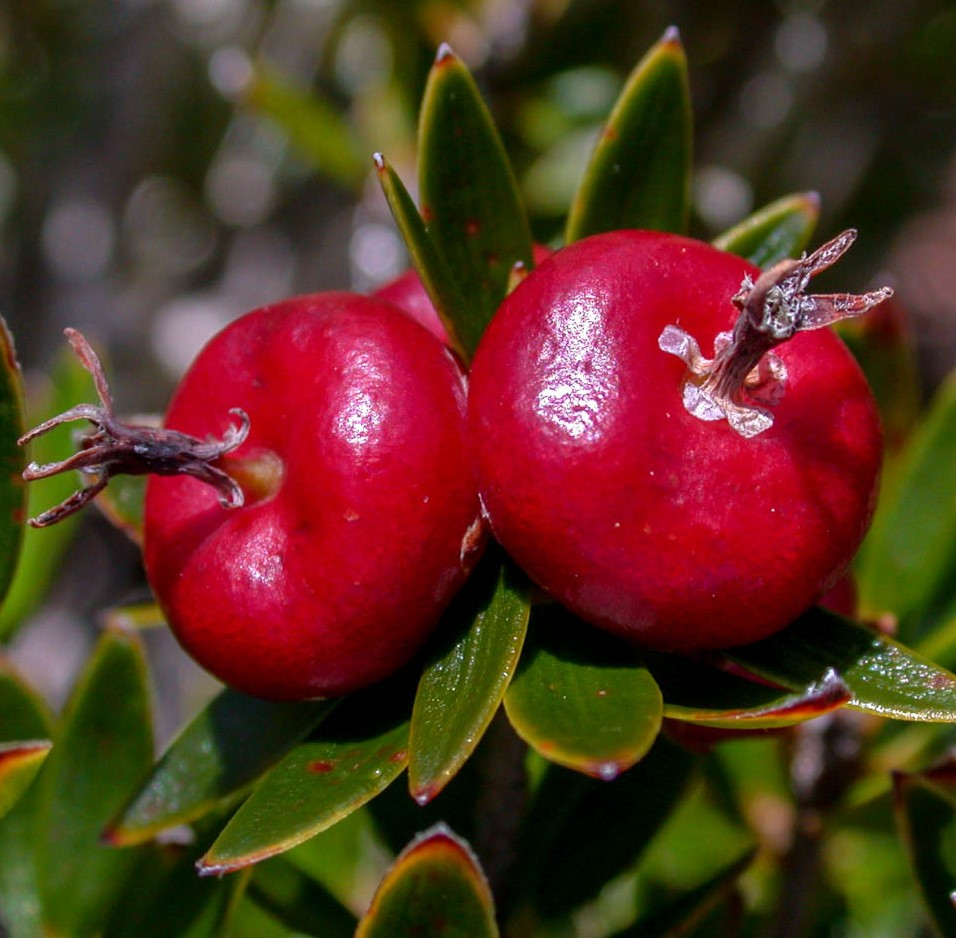
Flattened, round-ovate, red, edible fruit
