= Ryōzō Kanehira =

Japanese botanist (1882–1948)

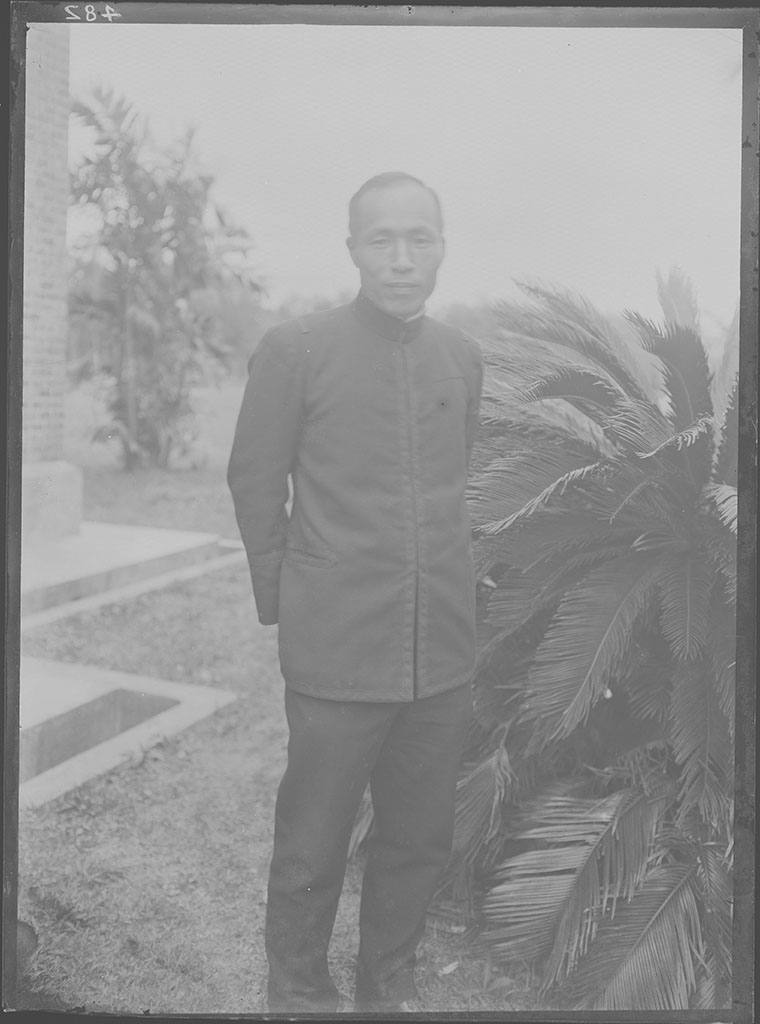
Ryōzō Kanehira at Taipei Botanical Garden, undated.

Ryōzō Kanehira (金平 亮三, Kanehira Ryōzō; January 1, 1882 – November 27, 1948) was a Japanese botanist. Kanehira undertook botanical expeditions into Taiwan, Peru, Palau, Kiribati, the Northern Mariana Islands, the Federated States of Micronesia, the Philippines, and Papua New Guinea as well as describing the flora of Japan. His main collection and types are held at the herbarium of Kyushu University, with duplicate specimens distributed to A, B, BO, BISH, FU, GH, K, L, LA, NY, P, PNH, TI, US, and Z (Index Herbariorum acronyms).

== See also ==
- Leptecophylla mariannensis (Kaneh.) C.M.Weiller (1999)
