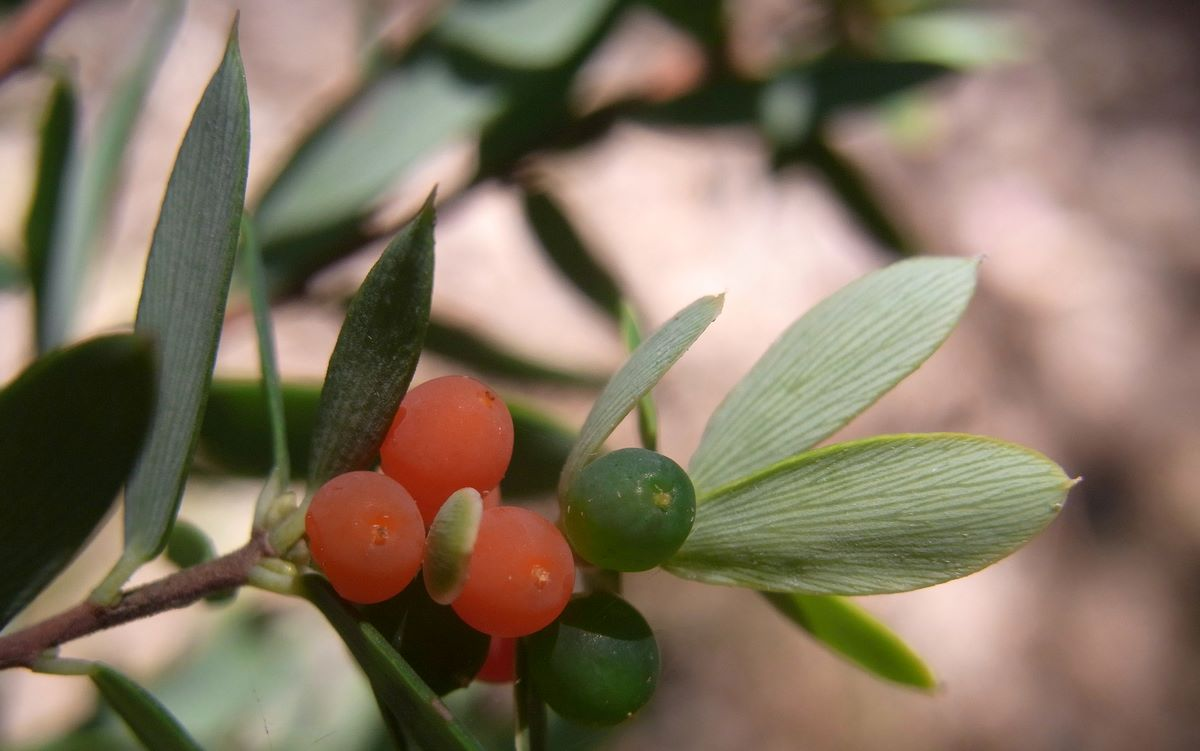
- Monotoca elliptica

Scientific classification
- Kingdom: Plantae
- Clade: Tracheophytes
- Clade: Angiosperms
- Clade: Eudicots
- Clade: Asterids
- Order: Ericales
- Family: Ericaceae
- Subfamily: Epacridoideae
- Tribe: Styphelieae
- Genus: Monotoca; R.Br.

= Monotoca =

Genus of shrubs

Monotoca is a genus of about 17 species of shrubs in the family Ericaceae. The genus is endemic to Australia.

Species include:

- Monotoca billawinica Albr.
- Monotoca elliptica (Sm.) R.Br. – tree broom heath
- Monotoca empetrifolia R.Br.
- Monotoca glauca (Labill.) Druce – goldy wood
- Monotoca ledifolia A.Cunn. ex DC.
- Monotoca leucantha E.Pritz.
- Monotoca linifolia (Rodway) W.M.Curtis
- Monotoca oligarrhenoides F.Muell.
- Monotoca oreophila Albr. – mountain broom heath
- Monotoca rotundifolia J.H.Willis – trailing monotoca
- Monotoca scoparia (Sm.) R.Br. – prickly broom heath
- Monotoca submutica (Benth.) Jarman
