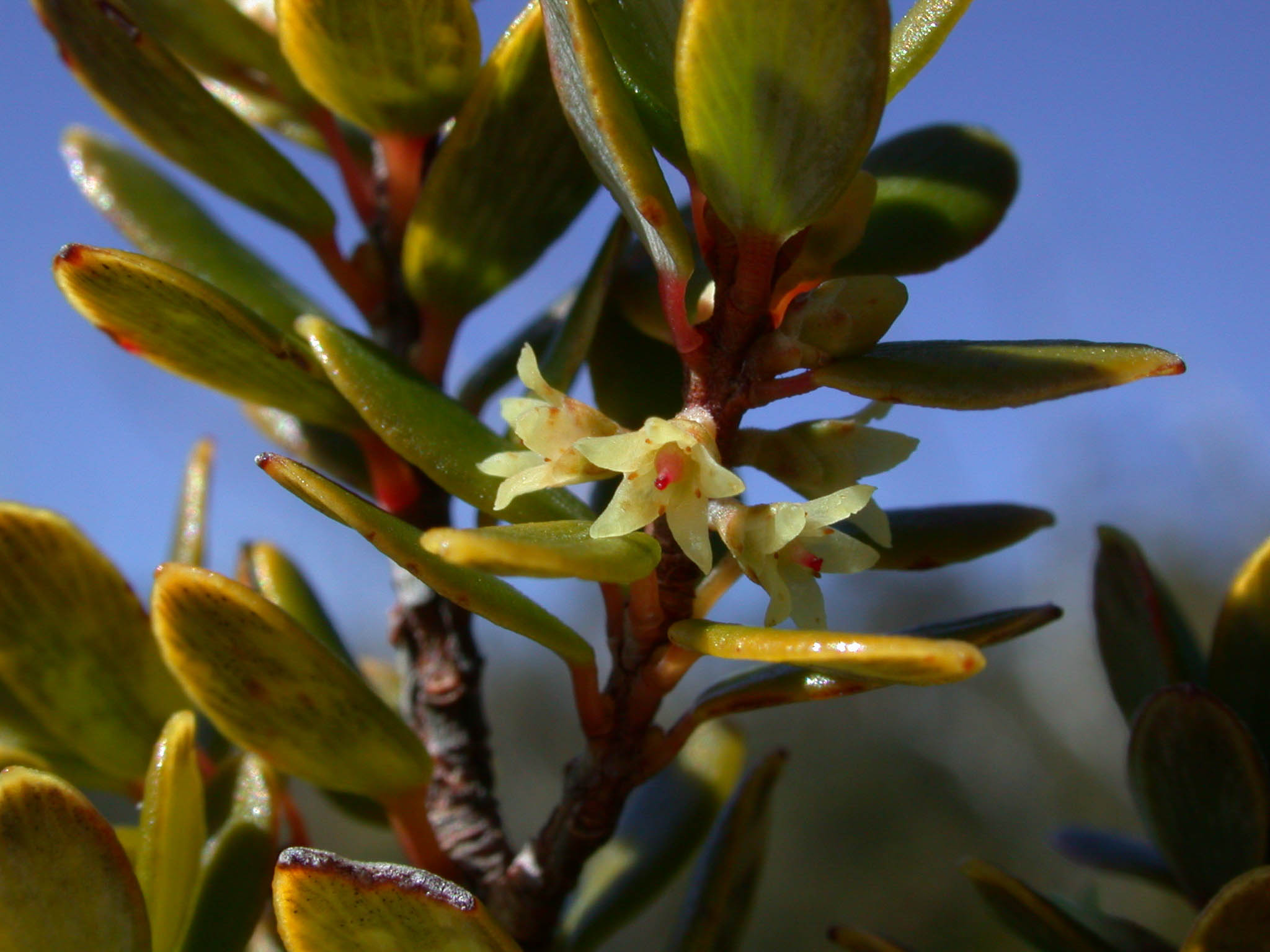

Scientific classification
- Kingdom: Plantae
- Clade: Tracheophytes
- Clade: Angiosperms
- Clade: Eudicots
- Clade: Asterids
- Order: Ericales
- Family: Ericaceae
- Genus: Monotoca
- Species: M. submutica

Binomial name
- Monotoca submutica (Benth.) Jarman

= Monotoca submutica =

Endemic Tasmanian flowering plant

Monotoca submutica, commonly known as mountain broomheath, is an endemic heath family shrub in the Epacridaceae family and is one of 17 species in the genus Monotoca. It is a widespread and locally common small to tall woody dense shrub found in the alpine/subalpine woodlands of southern and western mountains of Tasmania, Australia.

== Description ==
Monotoca submutica is an erect, dense and compact shrub, usually occurring as a small/medium shrub (1-3m high as a shrub) or when associated with wet sclorphyll forests it can grow as a small woody tree (up to 6m). Leaves are suberect and shaped from elliptical through to oblong/obovate (6-12mm long and 2–3.5mm wide), leaf margins are slightly recurved with a green flat or slightly convex adaxial surface and glaucous abaxial surface. The flowers are white and often solitarily arranged axillary, but can also be arranged in short spikes with 2-4 flowers. In most cases individuals are dioecious, with the main difference between female and male flowers being that the male flowers have their anthers half exserted. Immature fruit is spherical/oval and green, matured drupe turns to red/orange. Flowering occurs from September through to October. A distinguishing feature of Monotoca submutica is that the leaf apex is mucronate and not sharp.

== Distribution and habitat ==
Monotoca submutica is endemic to Tasmania. It is a widespread species in southern and western Tasmania, where it is found in subalpine forests and woodlands as a small to medium shrub. In wet sclerophyll forests that are associated with rainforests, it can occur as a small tree (up to 6m). On the east coast of Tasmania in the Freycinet Peninsula, a more robust form of the typical Monotoca submutica is known to occur.

== Cultivation ==
Monotoca submutica is not a commonly grown and cultivated species, would do best in well drained, moist soil with moderate sunlight.
