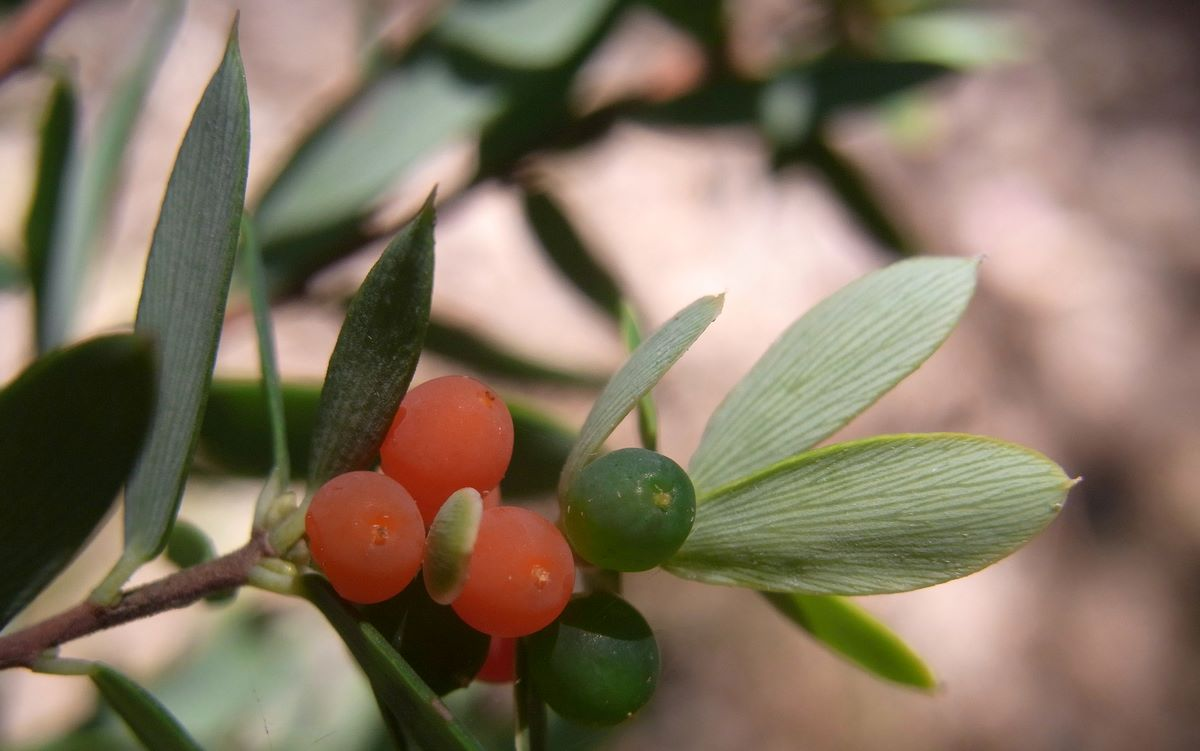

Scientific classification
- Kingdom: Plantae
- Clade: Tracheophytes
- Clade: Angiosperms
- Clade: Eudicots
- Clade: Asterids
- Order: Ericales
- Family: Ericaceae
- Genus: Monotoca
- Species: M. elliptica

Binomial name
- Monotoca elliptica (Sm.) R.Br.

Synonyms
- Styphelia elliptica Sm.

= Monotoca elliptica =

Tree broom heath

Species of tree

Monotoca elliptica, the tree broom heath, is a plant in the family Ericaceae, found in south-eastern Australia.

== Description ==
Monotoca elliptica is a long-lived species which may grow for more than a hundred years. The plant is often seen as a shrub of around three metres, however, exceptional specimens may reach ten metres tall. The habitat is scrub country, often near the coast on headlands and on sand dunes. A widespread plant, it is also found away from the coast and on the ranges in areas of mid to high rainfall.

Leaves are usually 10 to 25 mm long, 3 to 7 mm wide. Paler below with longitudinal leaf veins. A sharp prickle is on the leaf end. The leaf shape may be elliptic, oblong or reverse lanceolate. The leaf stem is 1 to 2 mm long and rough to touch. White flowers with red swollen anthers form in late winter and early spring on racemes. Red or orange round shaped fruit form in spring and summer, 3 to 4 mm in diameter. Indigenous Australians used them as food. The wood was used in early colonial times for tool handles. Bark is dark, furrowed and rough.

== Taxonomy ==
This plant first appeared in scientific literature in the year 1793 published as Styphelia elliptica in A Specimen of the Botany of New Holland by James Edward Smith. It was collected by Joseph Banks and Daniel Solander at Botany Bay near Sydney in the autumn of 1770. In 1810, the Scottish botanist Robert Brown published it in his Prodromus Florae Novae Hollandiae, as Monotoca elliptica. The specific epithet elliptica refers to the elliptical leaf shape.

== Regeneration and cultivation ==
Slow and difficult to grow from seed, though after 18 months, some seeds should germinate. Cuttings may be a better option. This plant may be used in hedges. A tough and adaptable plant which responds well to pruning.

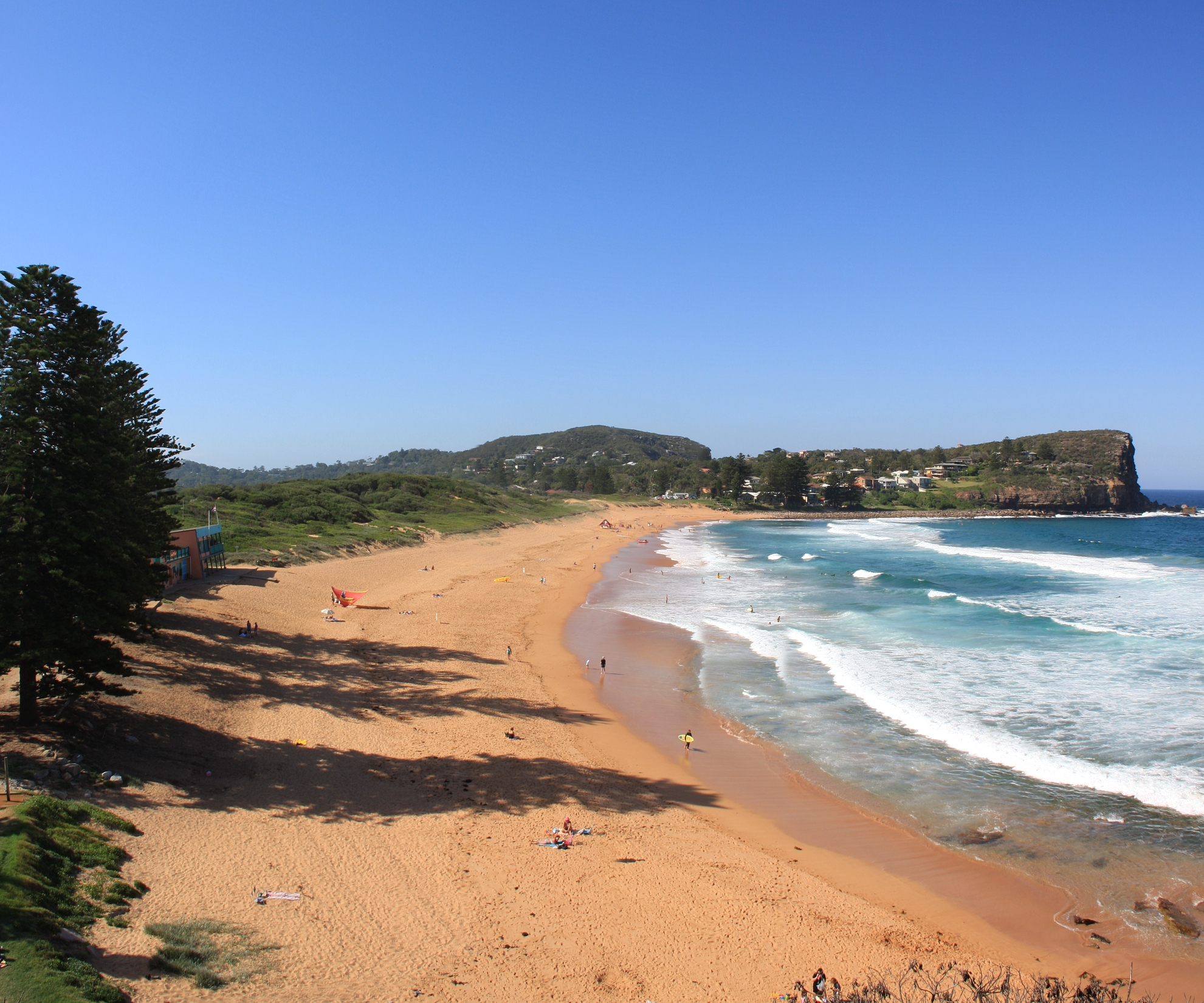
Tree broom heath grows on the sand dunes behind Avalon Beach
