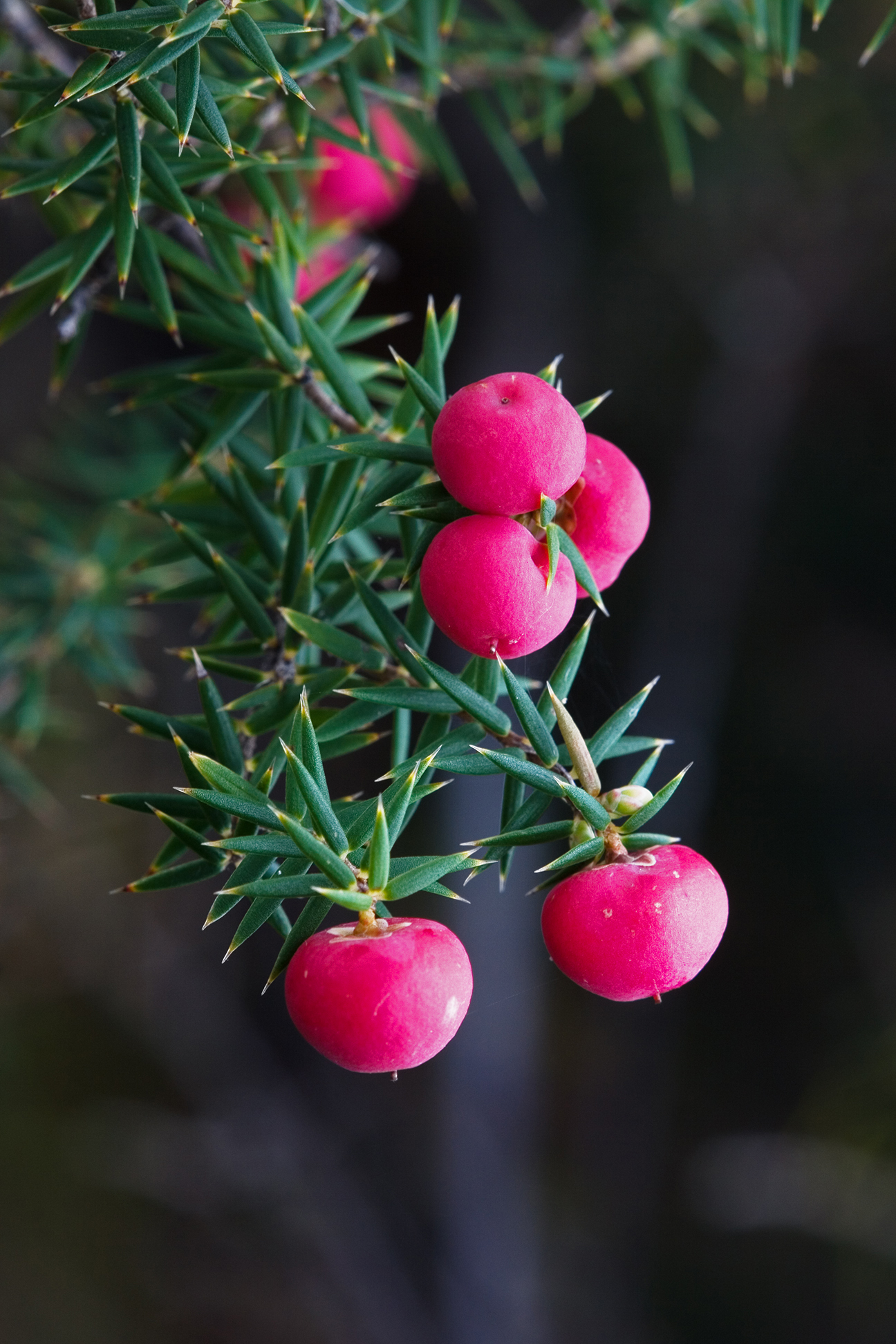
- On the Tasman Peninsula, Tasmania

Scientific classification
- Kingdom: Plantae
- Clade: Embryophytes
- Clade: Tracheophytes
- Clade: Spermatophytes
- Clade: Angiosperms
- Clade: Eudicots
- Clade: Asterids
- Order: Ericales
- Family: Ericaceae
- Genus: Leptecophylla
- Species: L. juniperina

Binomial name
- Leptecophylla juniperina (J.R.Forst. & G.Forst.) C.M.Weiller

Synonyms
- List: Cyathodes juniperina (J.R.Forst. & G.Forst.) Druce; Epacris juniperina J.R.Forst. & G.Forst.; Leucopogon lanceolatus R.Br. nom. superfl.; Styphelia juniperina (J.R.Forst. & G.Forst.) Willd.; Styphelia lanceolata Sm. nom. superfl.; Ardisia acerosa Gaertn.; Cyathodes acerosa (Gaertn.) Roem. & Schult.; Cyathodes articulata Colenso; Leucopogon forsteri A.Rich.; Lissanthe acerosa Spreng.; Styphelia acerosa Sol. ex Gaertn.

= Leptecophylla juniperina =

Species of fruit and plant

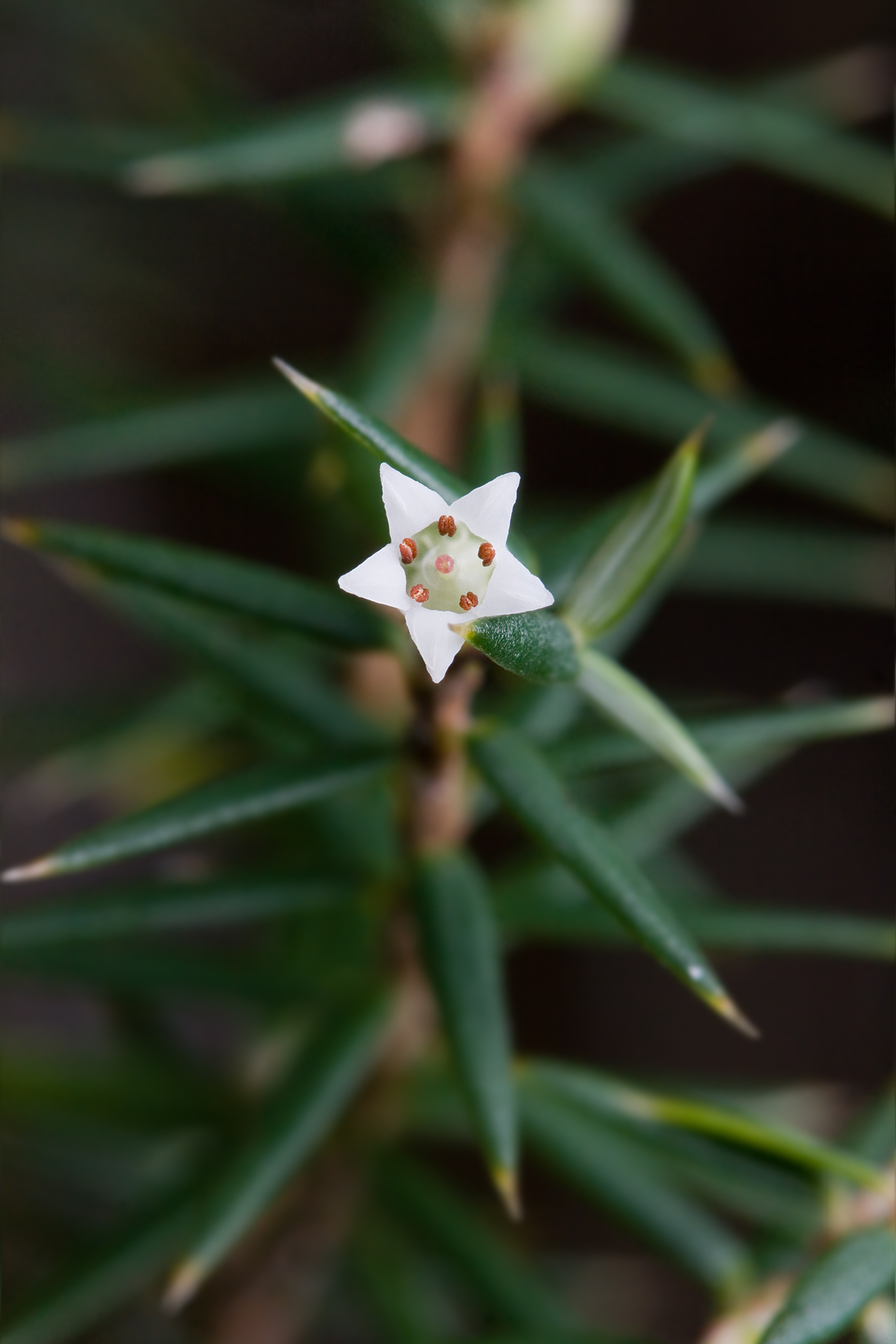

Leptecophylla juniperina is a species of flowering plant in the family Ericaceae and is native to Australia and New Zealand. It is usually a shrub with narrowly egg-shaped, sharply pointed leaves, bell-shaped flowers arranged singly and white or pink drupes.

== Description ==
Leptecophylla juniperina is a compact or tall shrub that typically grows to a height of 0.4–2 m (1 ft 4 in – 6 ft 7 in), rarely a tree to 6 m (20 ft) and has rounded brown branchlets. Its leaves are narrowly egg-shaped, 4.2–18 mm (0.17–0.71 in) long, 1.1–2.5 mm (0.043–0.098 in) wide with a sharply pointed tip 0.4–1.6 mm (0.016–0.063 in) long and a petiole 0.6–1.7 mm (0.024–0.067 in) long. The flowers are arranged singly in leaf axils or on the ends of branchlets, male flowers on a pedicel 2–5 mm (0.079–0.197 in) long and female flowers on a pedicel 1.3–3 mm (0.051–0.118 in) long. There are egg-shaped bracts 0.5–0.9 mm (0.020–0.035 in) long and 8 to 24 overlapping, egg-shaped bracteoles 1.2–2.4 mm (0.047–0.094 in) long on the pedicels. The sepals are 1.7–3.1 mm (0.067–0.122 in) long and the petal tube is bell-shaped and longer than the sepals, the male flowers 2.1–4.4 mm (0.083–0.173 in) long and the female flowers 1.6–2.8 mm (0.063–0.110 in) long. Flowering time depends on subspecies, and the fruit is a white or pale to dark pink drupe, 4–7 mm (0.16–0.28 in) high and 5–9 mm (0.20–0.35 in) wide.

== Taxonomy ==
This species was first formally described in 1775 by Johann Forster and Georg Forster who gave it the name Epacris juniperina in their book Characteres Generum Plantarum. In 2000, Carolyn M. Weiller transferred the species to the genus Leptecophylla as L. juniperina in the journal Muelleria. and described three subspecies:

- Leptecophylla juniperina (J.R.Forst. & G.Forst.) C.M.Weiller subsp. juniperina has glabrous petals, leaves 4–18 mm (0.16–0.71 in) long and 1–2.1 mm (0.039–0.083 in) wide with flat edges, 5 veins, and flowers from September to May.
- Leptecophylla juniperina subsp. oxycedrus(Labill.) C.M.Weiller has glabrous petals, leaves 4.2–5.8 mm (0.17–0.23 in) long and 1–2.1 mm (0.039–0.083 in) wide, 3 to 5 veins and mainly flowers from September and October.
- Leptecophylla juniperina subsp. parvifolia(R.Br.) C.M.Weiller has petals with a few rigid hairs, leaves 1.5–2.5 mm (0.059–0.098 in) wide, 5 to 7 veins and mainly flowers in November and December.

== Distribution and habitat ==
Leptecophylla juniperina is native to New Zealand and Victoria and Tasmania. Subspecies Juniperina is widespread in forest and shrubland in New Zealand and in lowland areas of eastern, north-western and western areas of Tasmania. Subspecies oxycedrus is restricted to exposed, rocky coastal regions of southern and western Tasmania, Bass Strait Islands and southern Victoria and subsp. parvifolia is common at altitudes above 600 m (2,000 ft) in central and eastern parts of Tasmania.

== Common names ==
Common names in New Zealand include prickly heath and prickly mingimingi. Māori names for this plant include hukihuki, hukihukiraho, inakapōriro, inangapōriro, kūkuku, miki, mikimiki, mingi, mingimingi ngohungohu, pā tōtara, taumingi, and tūmingi. In Australia, subspecies parvifolia is known as pink mountain berry
