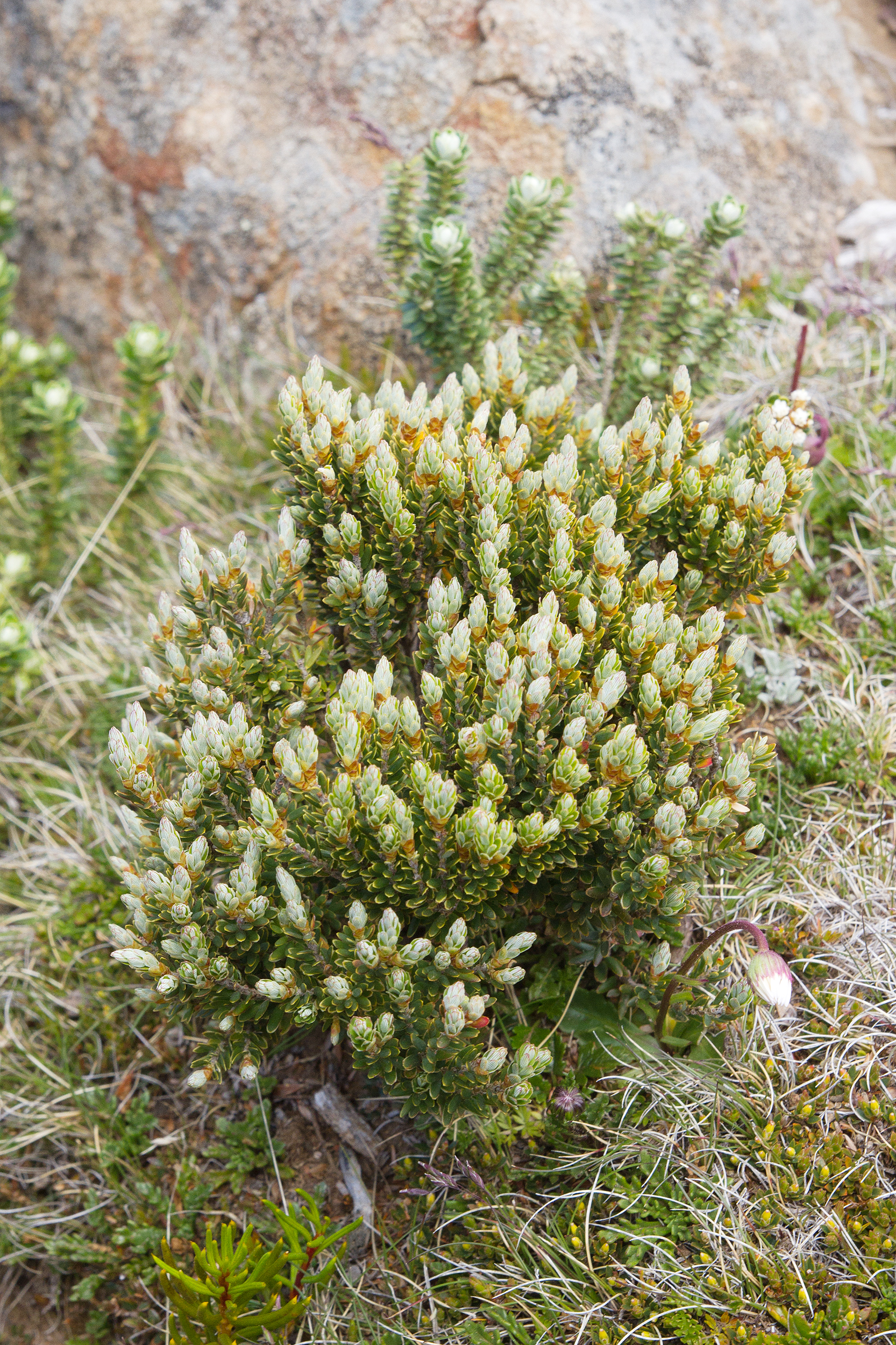
- Cyathodes petiolaris

Scientific classification
- Kingdom: Plantae
- Clade: Tracheophytes
- Clade: Angiosperms
- Clade: Eudicots
- Clade: Asterids
- Order: Ericales
- Family: Ericaceae
- Subfamily: Epacridoideae
- Tribe: Styphelieae
- Genus: Cyathodes; Labill.

= Cyathodes =

Genus of flowering plants

Cyathodes is a genus of shrubs within the family Ericaceae. A characteristic feature of the genus is a deeply five-cleft calyx.

The genus was described by Jacques Labillardière based on floral characters like floral parts number, corolla shape, number of floral parts, locule number and number of seeds per locule. Species include:

- Cyathodes dealbata R.Br.
- Cyathodes glauca Labill.
- Cyathodes petiolaris (DC.) Druce
- Cyathodes platystoma C.M.Weiller
- Cyathodes straminea R.Br.

A number of species formerly included in this genus are now placed in the genera Acrothamnus, Leptecophylla, Lissanthe and Planocarpa.
