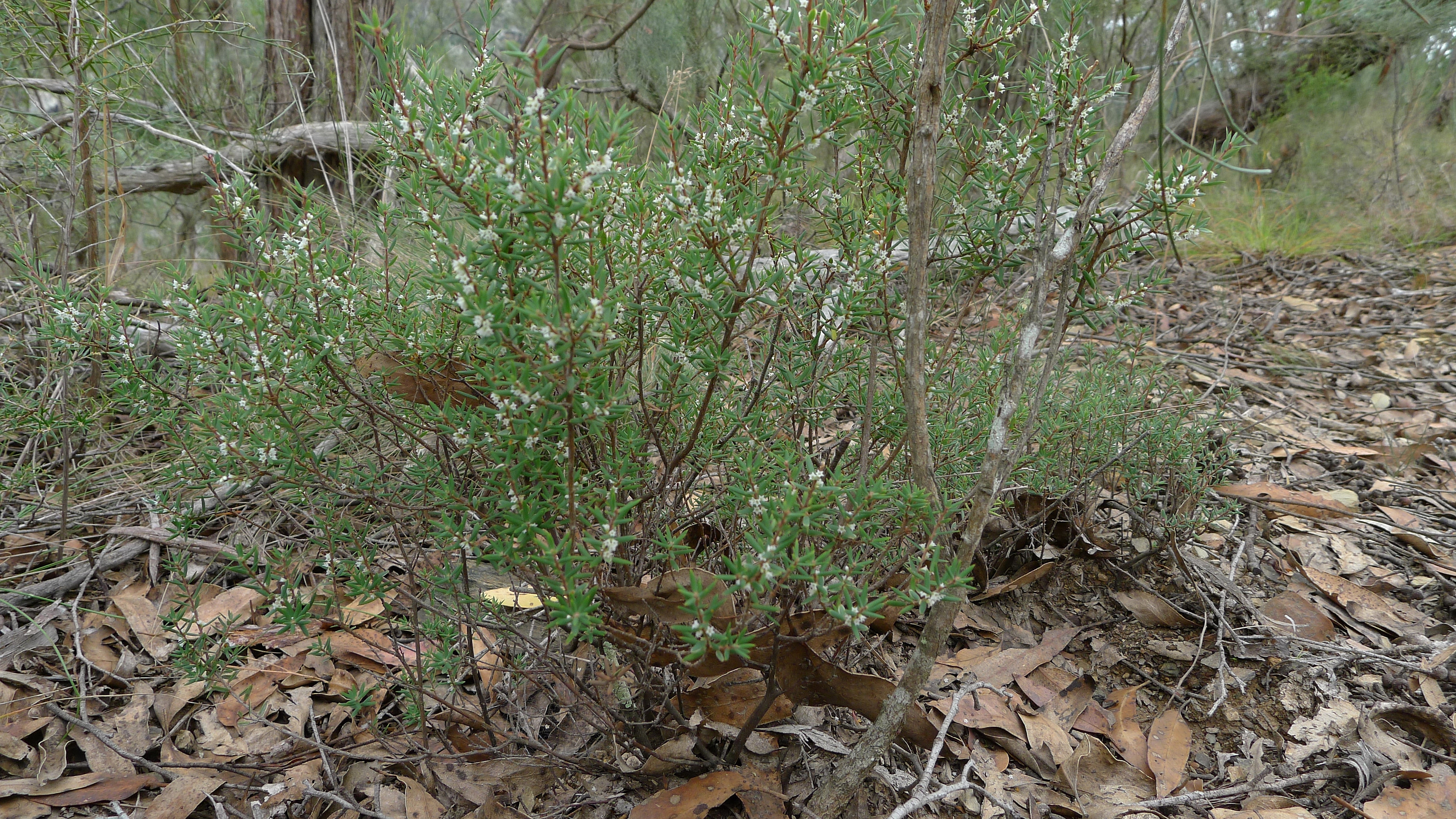

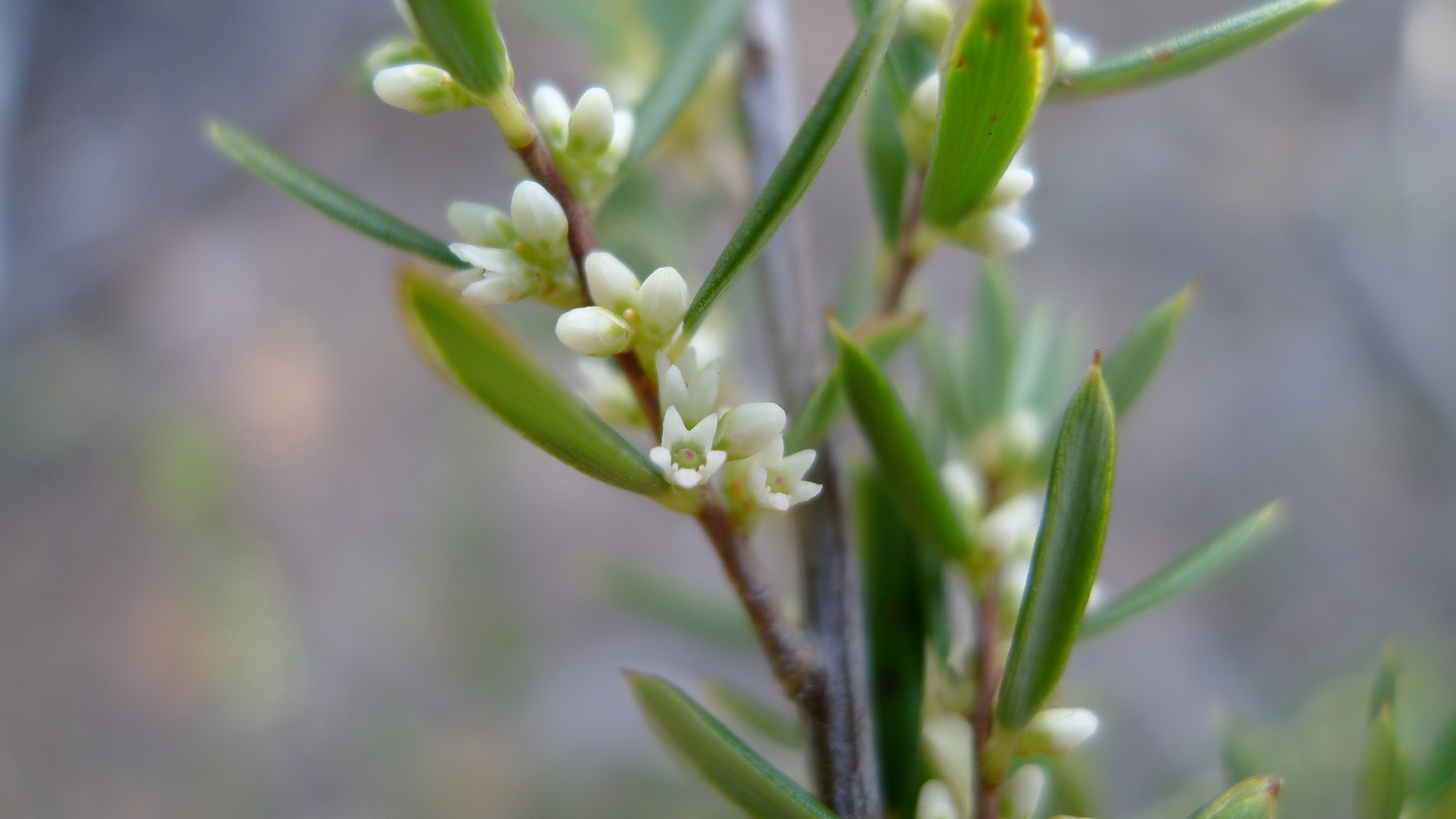

Scientific classification
- Kingdom: Plantae
- Clade: Tracheophytes
- Clade: Angiosperms
- Clade: Eudicots
- Clade: Asterids
- Order: Ericales
- Family: Ericaceae
- Genus: Monotoca
- Species: M. scoparia

Binomial name
- Monotoca scoparia (Sm.) R.Br.

Synonyms
- Styphelia scoparia Sm.

= Monotoca scoparia =

Species of tree

Monotoca scoparia, commonly known as prickly broom heath, is a widespread native species across south-eastern Australia. Monotoca scoparia was formerly in the family Epacridaceae but now belongs to the family Ericaceae. Monotoca is an endemic Australian genus with 17 described species occurring in all states.

== Description ==
Monotoca scoparia is a lignotuberous shrub that grows usually between 30–120 cm high. The alternating leaves are erect and prickly, and narrowly oblong to elliptic in shape. Leaves are 0.6-2.2 cm long and 1–4 mm wide. The adaxial (upper) surface of the leaf is dark green in colour and the abaxial (lower) surface in a pale green to whitish colour, with 3-5 prominent veins. Leaf tips are sharp and branchlets are rough to hairless.

The male and female flowers occur on different plants. Flowers are tubular and white to cream in colour. Flowers in 2-9 clusters occur in axillary spikes or the lowermost occurs solitary. The corolla of female flowers is 1.3-2.8 mm long and the male corolla is slightly longer, 2–4 mm. Flowering occurs most of the year, from December to August. The fleshy, oblong fruit is yellow to orange. A distinguishing feature of the Monotoca scoparia flower is the corolla tube is longer than the sepals.

== Distribution and habitat ==
Monotoca scoparia is widespread across Australia with sightings recorded across the country in Tasmania, Victoria, New South Wales, Queensland and few in Northern Territory and South Australia. Monotoca scoparia is a common understorey shrub in dry sclerophyll forest, woodland and heathland. Monotoca scoparia occurs on well-drained sandy and rocky soils from sea-level to montane elevations in full sun to semi-shade.

Tasmania has six native species of Monotoca. These species are all quite similar and can be difficult to distinguish. The most similar species to Monotoca scoparia is the Tasmanian endemic species Monotoca submutica, which can be described as Monotoca scoparia var. submutica. Monotoca scoparia and Monotoca submutica closely resemble each other, except the flowers of Monotoca scoparia are longer and flowering times are different. These two species also differ in habitat, where Monotoca submutica is widespread across southern and western Tasmania growing in subalpine forest and wet sclerophyll rainforest.

== Ecological importance ==
Monotoca scoparia and other heath species such as Epacris impressa, Leptospermum trinerivium, xanthorrhoea sp. and a variety of legumes make up the preferred diet on the Smoky mouse (Pseudomys fumeus) in New South Wales. Pseudomys fumeus is an endangered rodent. Studies found that Monotoca scoparia was a major food source for this species and therefore its presence is important for the survival of this endangered species as well as the other species that feed on it.

== Cultivation ==
Monotoca scoparia is commonly used in gardens. Best results for the prickly shrub occur when established in gardens, located in well drained positions with full sun to semi-shade. Establishment will occur under existing trees. Monotoca scoparia is often used in gardens for hedging and regulating traffic.
