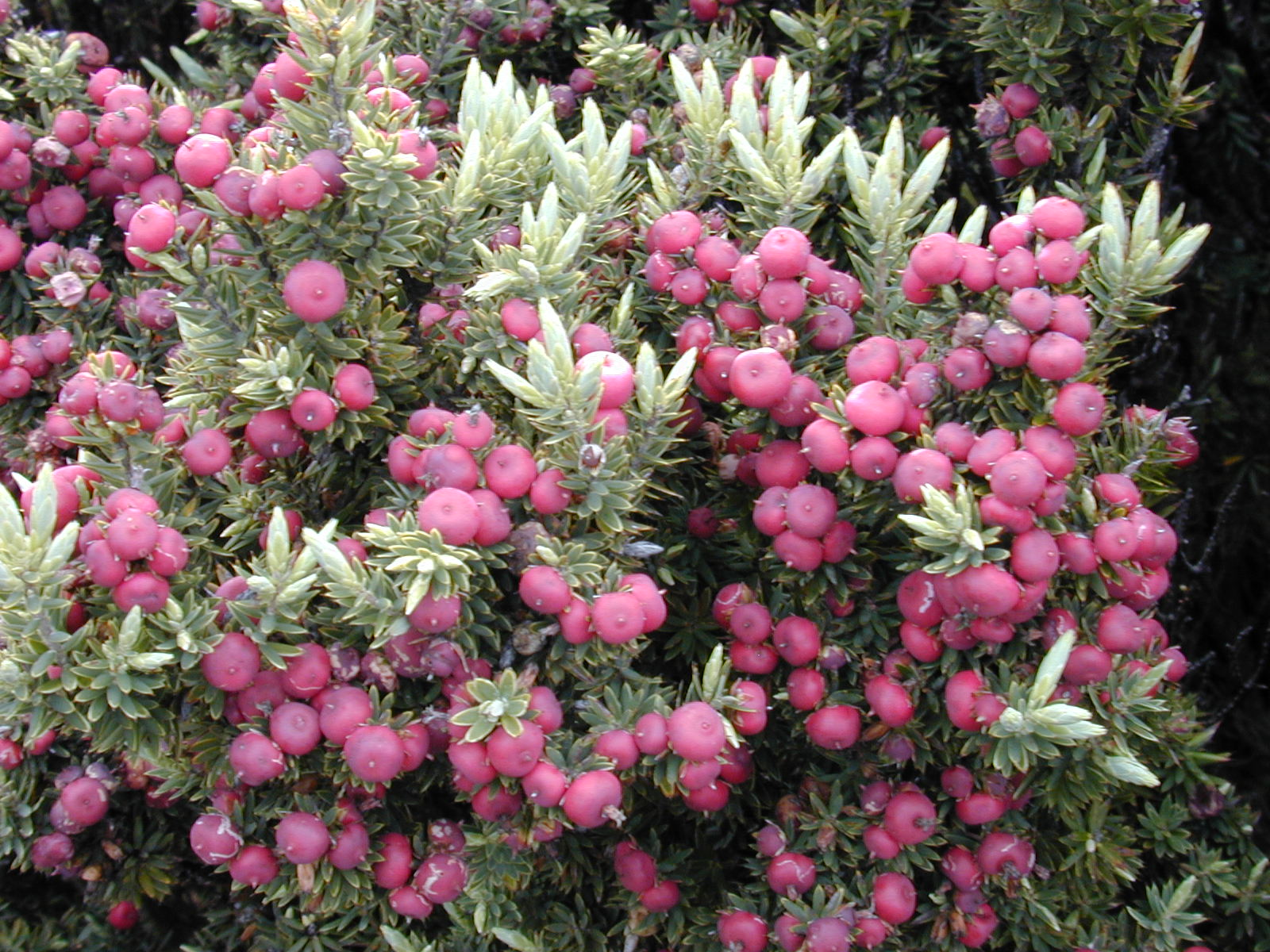

Scientific classification
- Kingdom: Plantae
- Clade: Tracheophytes
- Clade: Angiosperms
- Clade: Eudicots
- Clade: Asterids
- Order: Ericales
- Family: Ericaceae
- Genus: Leptecophylla
- Species: L. tameiameiae

Binomial name
- Leptecophylla tameiameiae (Cham. & Schltdl.) C.M.Weiller

Synonyms
- Cyathodes tameiameiae Cham. & Schltdl. Styphelia douglasii (A.Gray) Skottsb. Styphelia tameiameiae (Cham.) F.Muell.

= Leptecophylla tameiameiae =

Species of tree

Leptecophylla tameiameiae, known as pūkiawe or maiele in the Hawaiian language, is a species of flowering plant that is native to the Hawaiian and Marquesas Islands. The specific epithet honors King Kamehameha I, who formed the Kingdom of Hawaiʻi. It grows as a tree up to 4.6 m (15 ft) tall in forests and as a shrub 0.9–3 m (3.0–9.8 ft) in height elsewhere. Its small needle-like leaves are whitish underneath, dark green above. The round berries range in color from white through shades of pink to red. Pūkiawe is found in a variety of habitats in Hawaii at elevations of 15–3,230 m (49–10,597 ft), including mixed mesic forests, wet forests, bogs, and alpine shrublands.

== Ecology ==
Pūkiawe is a hardy, adaptive, and morphologically variable plant that occupies a variety of ecosystems, from dry forest up to alpine bogs and shrublands. Despite being common, it is difficult to propagate, taking months to years for seeds to germinate and growing very slowly.

The nēnē and other birds eat the berries of this shrub and thus distribute it.

== Human Uses ==
Native Hawaiians would inhale ground leaves of the pūkiawe to treat congestion, and used the fruit to make lei.

Hawaiian nobility used the smoke of pūkiawe to modify their mana before interacting with people of lower caste. The bodies of executed criminals were cremated on pyres of pūkiawe to drive the mana from their bones and ensure their ghosts were harmless.
