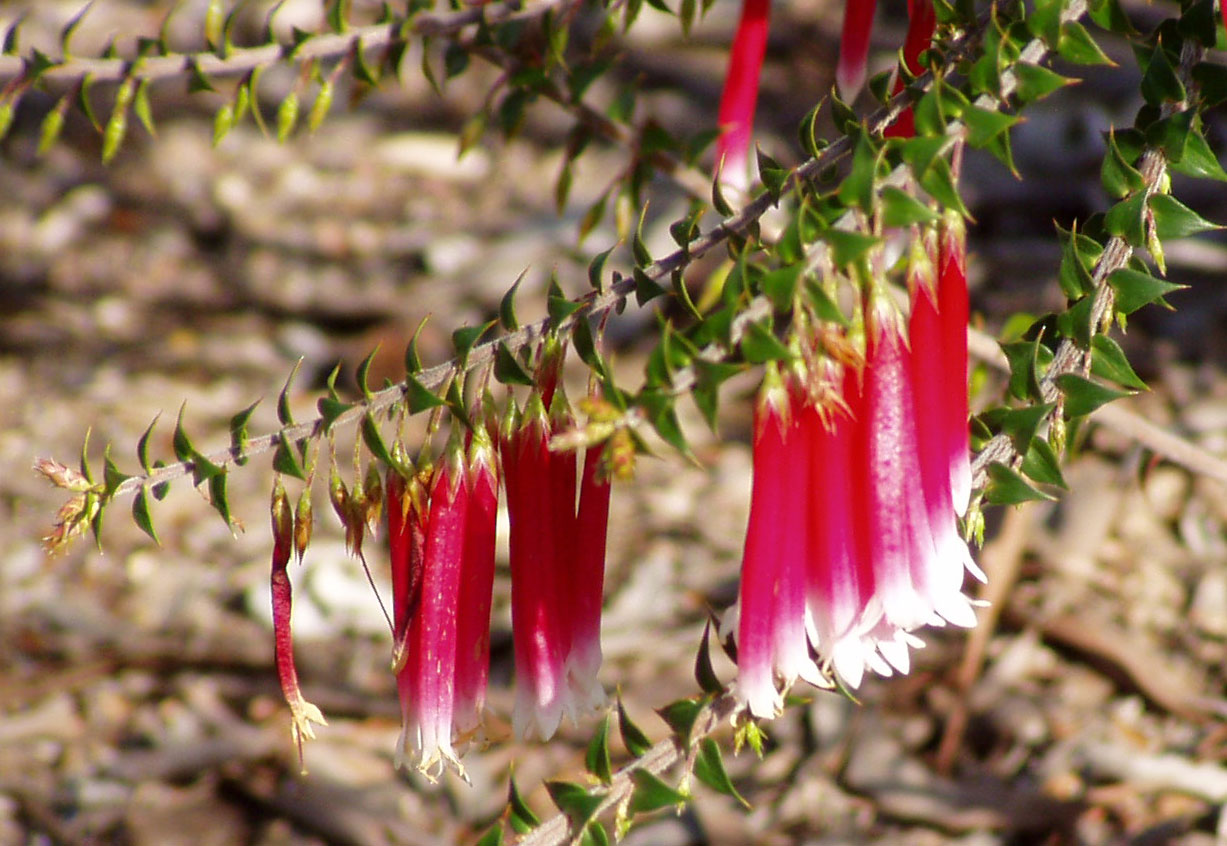
- Epacris longiflora

Scientific classification
- Kingdom: Plantae
- Clade: Tracheophytes
- Clade: Angiosperms
- Clade: Eudicots
- Clade: Asterids
- Order: Ericales
- Family: Ericaceae
- Subfamily: Epacridoideae; Arn.

Tribes and genera
- See text.

Synonyms
- Styphelioideae Sweet

= Epacridoideae =

Subfamily of plants

Epacridoideae is a subfamily of the family Ericaceae. The name Styphelioideae Sweet is also used. The subfamily contains around 35 genera and 545 species. Many species are found in Australasia, others occurring northwards through the Pacific to Southeast Asia, with a small number in South America.

== Description ==
The Epacridoideae form a well supported monophyletic group within the family Ericaceae, clearly diagnosable using a combination of morphological characters. These include a lignified leaf epidermis, dry, membrane-like (scarious) bracts on the inflorescence, and a persistent corolla. The stamens are also distinctive: there are fewer than twice the number of corolla lobes and their filaments are smooth. Some of these characters are individually present in other members of the family Ericaceae. Core members of the subfamily (i.e. excluding Prionoteae) also have parallel- or somewhat palmate-veined leaves and lack multicellular hairs.

== Taxonomy ==
In 1810, Robert Brown treated the group as the family Epacridaceae. It was treated as a subfamily by Robert Sweet in 1828 (using the name Stypheliae). George Arnott Walker-Arnott also treated it as a subfamily in 1832 (using the name Epacrideae). Although Sweet's name is earlier, Article 19.5 of the International Code of Nomenclature for algae, fungi, and plants provides that when a subfamily is formed by reducing the rank of a family, the type of a conserved family name has precedence, making Epacridoideae the correct name. Although Sweet and Walker-Arnott had treated the group as a subfamily, botanists preferred Brown's rank of family, as in the Cronquist system, until both morphological and molecular phylogenetic studies in the 1990s showed that excluding Epacridaceae from Ericaceae made the latter paraphyletic.

=== Phylogeny ===
The subfamily is divided into tribes, whose suggested relationship is shown in the following cladogram. The number of genera is approximate.

- - Prionoteae (2 genera)
  - - Archerieae (1 genus: Archeria)
    - - Oligarrheneae (3 genera)
      - - Cosmelieae (3 genera)
        - - Richeeae (2 genera)
          - - Epacrideae (5 genera)
            - Styphelieae (16+ genera)

=== Genera ===
Based largely on the phylogenetic classification of Kron et al. (2002), with some later modifications, genera that may be placed in the subfamily include the following (tribe in parentheses):

- Acrothamnus Quinn (Styphelieae)
- Acrotriche R.Br. (Styphelieae)
- Agiortia Quinn (Styphelieae)
- Andersonia R.Br. (Cosmelieae)
- Androstoma Hook.f. (Styphelieae)
- Archeria Hook.f. (Archerieae)
- Astroloma R.Br. (Styphelieae)
- Brachyloma Sond. (Styphelieae)
- Coleanthera Stschegl. (Styphelieae)
- Conostephium Benth. (Styphelieae)
- Cosmelia R.Br. (Cosmelieae)
- Croninia J.M.Powell (Styphelieae)
- Cyathodes Labill. (Styphelieae)
- Cyathopsis Brongn. & Gris (Styphelieae)
- Decatoca F.Muell. (Styphelieae)
- Dielsiodoxa Albr. (Oligarrheneae)
- Dracophyllum Labill. (Richeeae)
- Epacris Cav. (Epacrideae)
- Lebetanthus Endl. (Prionoteae)
- Leptecophylla C.M.Weiller (Styphelieae)
- Leucopogon R.Br. (Styphelieae)
- Lissanthe R.Br. (Styphelieae)
- Lysinema R.Br. (Epacrideae)
- Melichrus R.Br. (Styphelieae)
- Monotoca R.Br. (Styphelieae)
- Montitega C.M.Weiller (Styphelieae)
- Needhamiella L.Watson (Oligarrheneae)
- Oligarrhena R.Br. (Oligarrheneae)
- Pentachondra R.Br. (Styphelieae)
- Planocarpa C.M.Weiller (Styphelieae)
- Prionotes R.Br. (Prionoteae)
- Richea R.Br. (Richeeae)
- Sphenotoma (R.Br.) Sweet (Richeeae)
- Sprengelia Sm. (Cosmelieae)
- Styphelia Sm. (Styphelieae)
- Trochocarpa R.Br. (Styphelieae)
- Woollsia F.Muell. (Epacrideae)

== Distribution ==
Members of the Epacridoideae are largely confined to Australasia, being particularly diverse in southwestern Western Australia, Tasmania, and southeastern Australia. However, some species occur in southern South America (Lebetanthus), Hawaii (Styphelia), and Southeast Asia (Leucopogon).

== Gallery ==
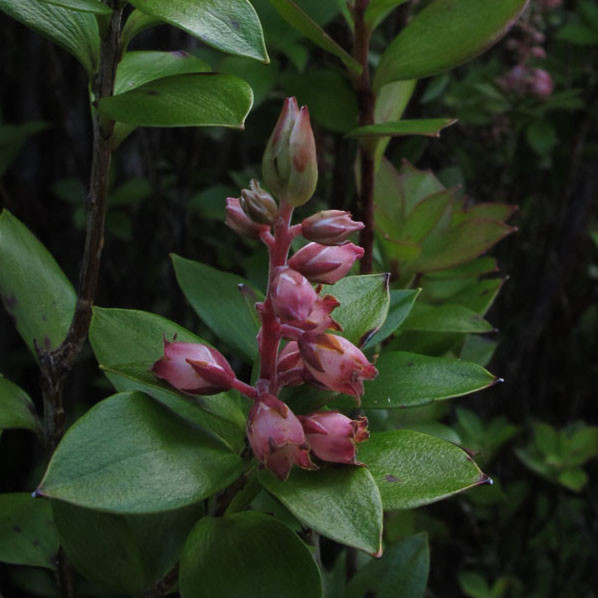
Archeria racemosa (Archerieae)

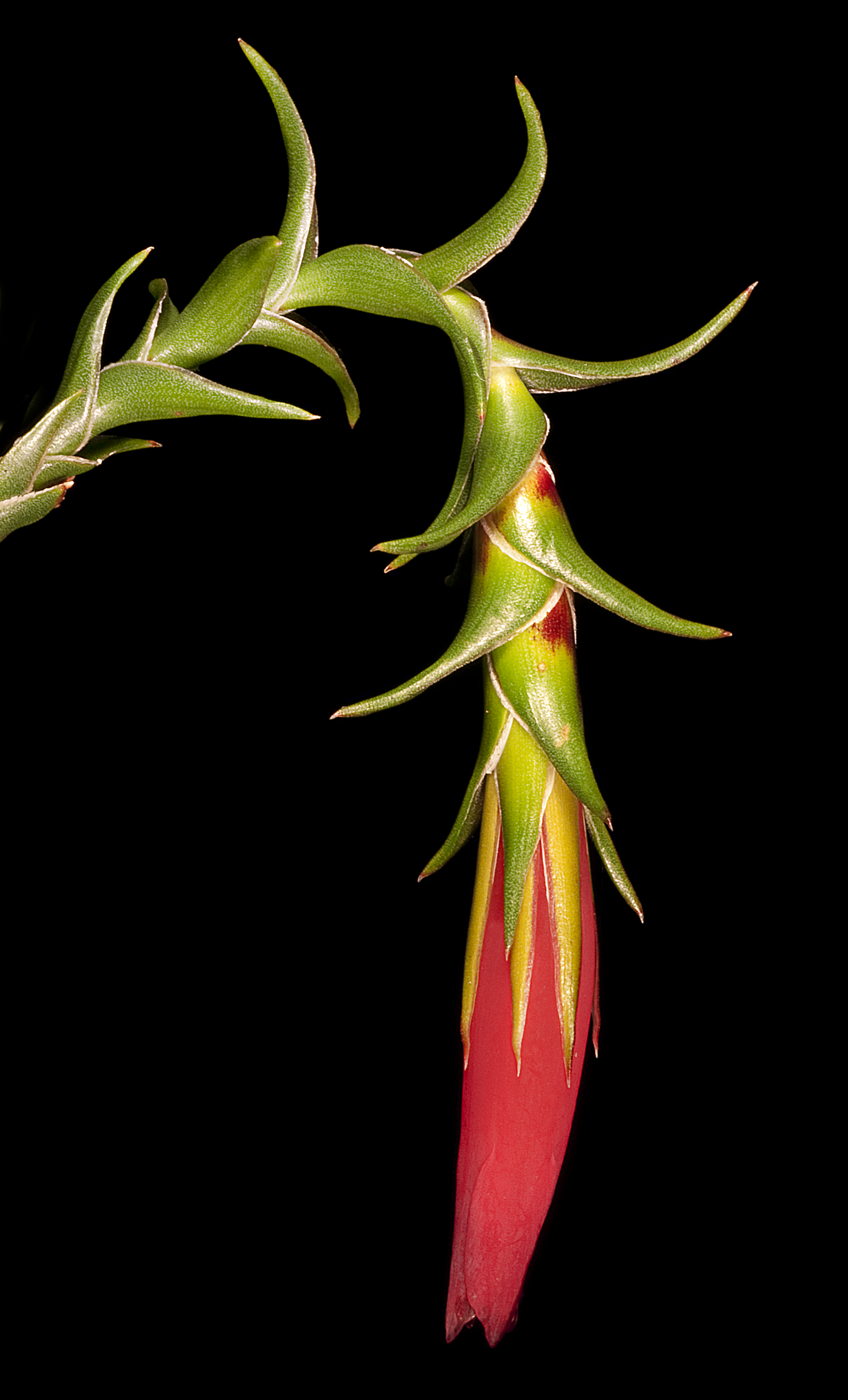
Cosmelia rubra (Cosmelieae)

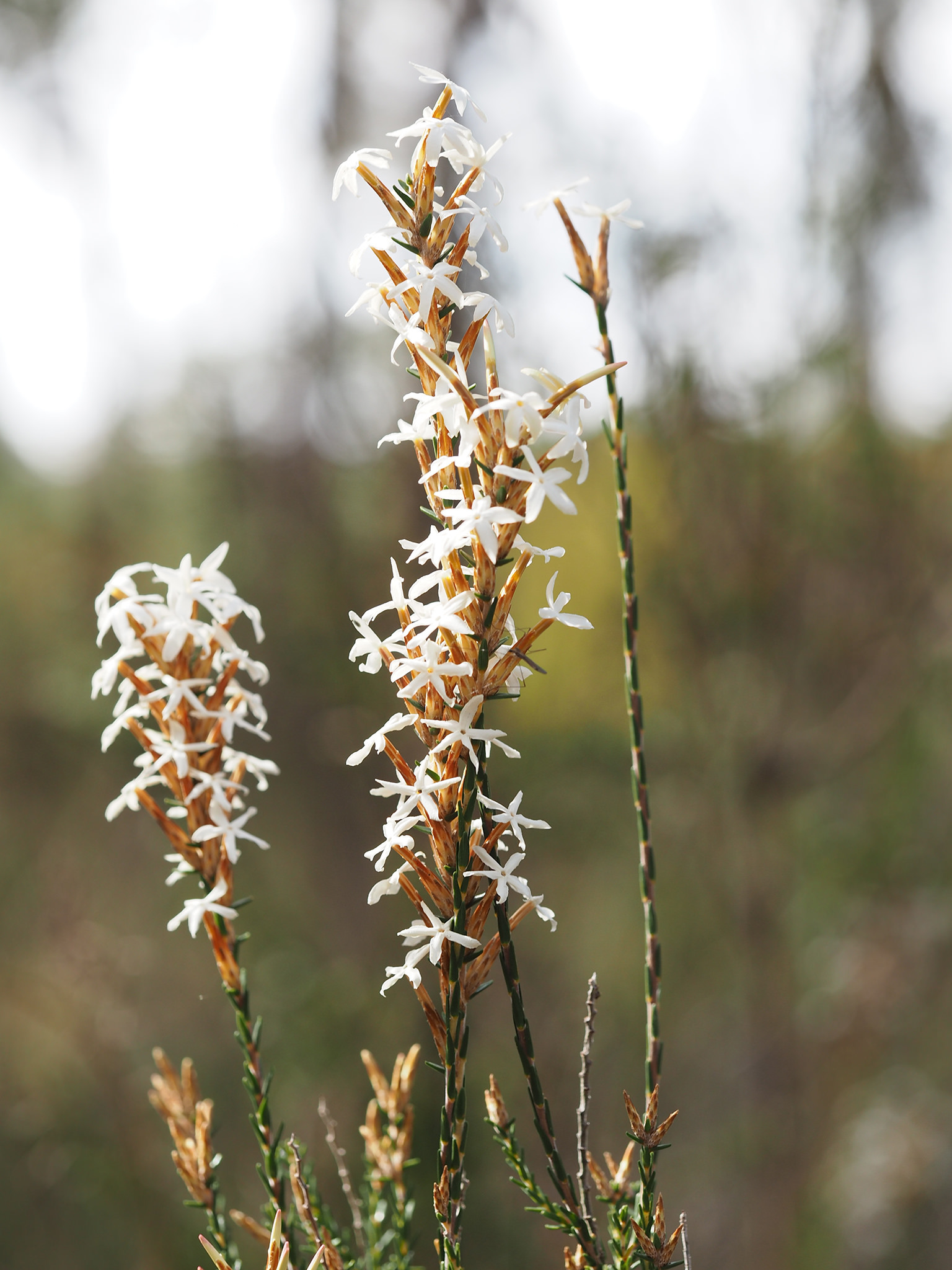
Lysinema ciliatum (Epacrideae)

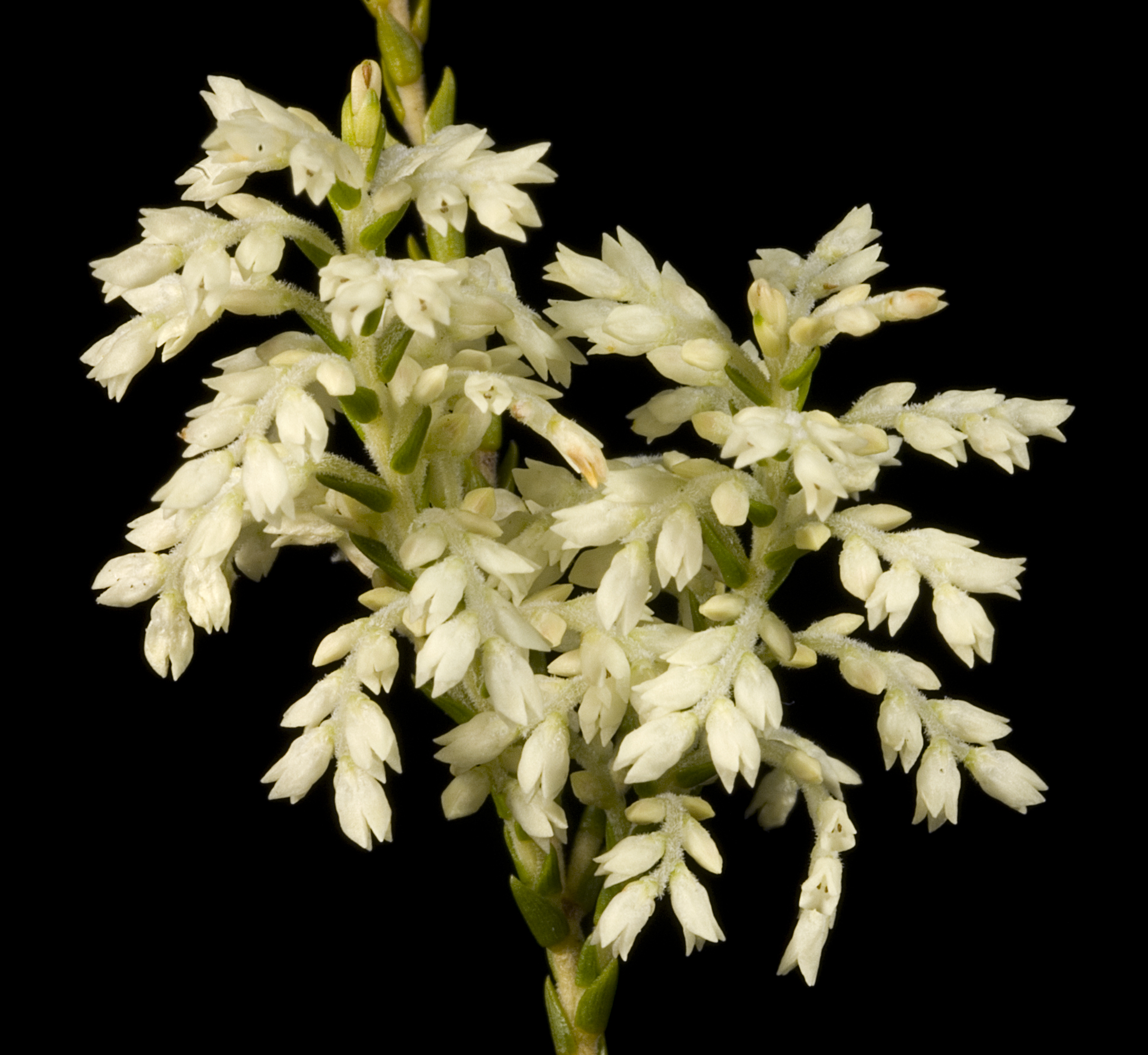
Oligarrhena micrantha (Oligarrheneae)

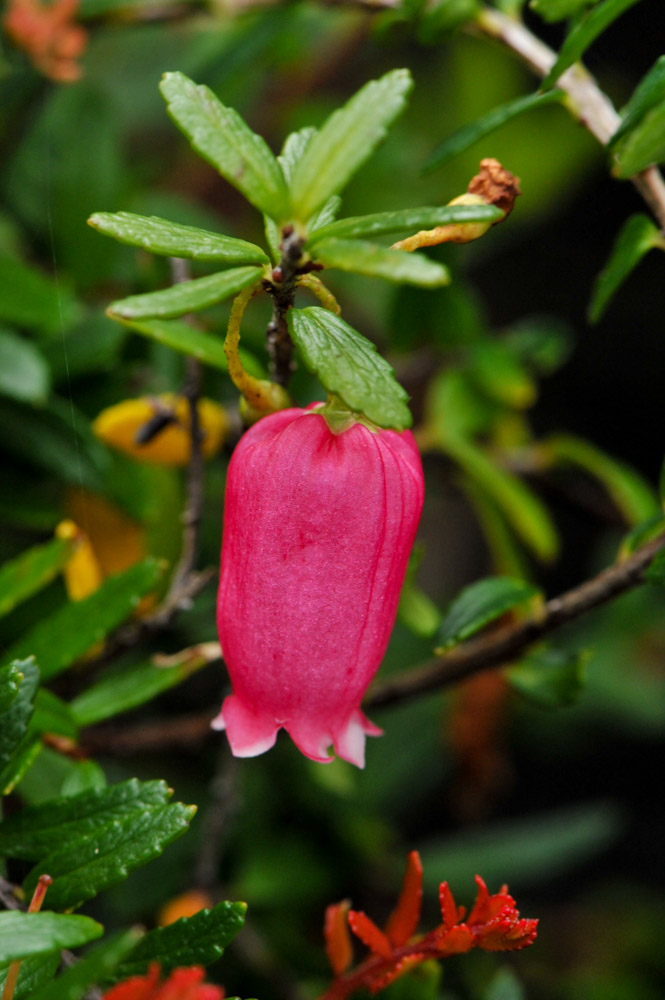
Prionotes cerinthoides (Prionoteae)

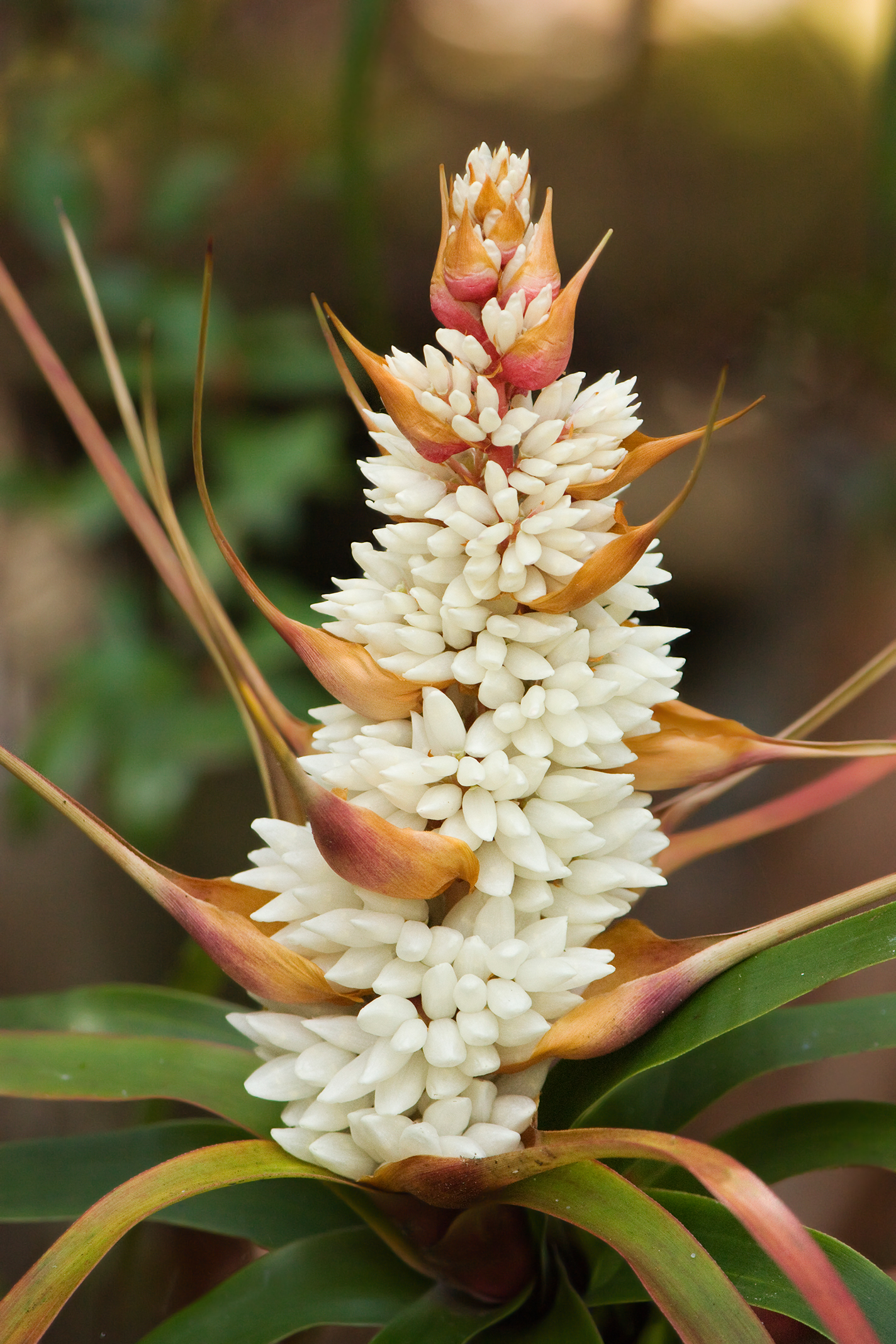
Richea dracophylla (Richeeae)

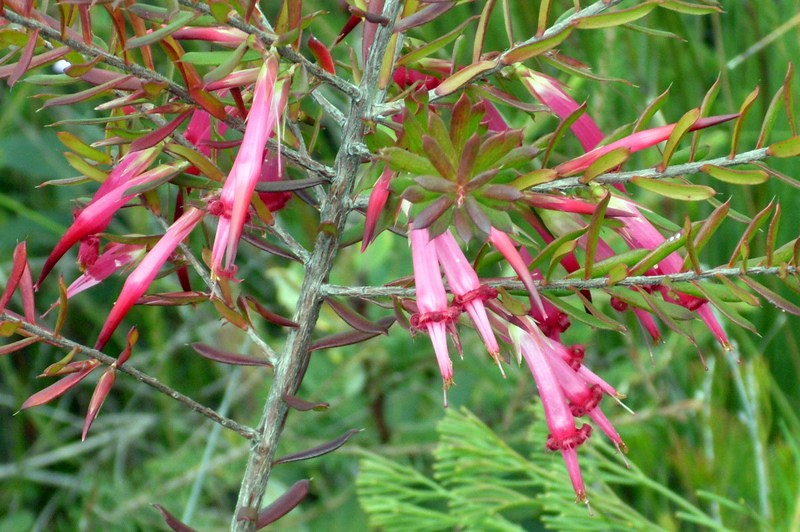
Styphelia tubiflora (Styphelieae)
