= Coleanthera =

Genus of flowering plants

Coleanthera is a historically recognised genus of 3 species in the family Ericaceae and was endemic to Western Australia.

The genus was first described in 1859 by Sergei Sergeyevich Sheglejev. The name Coleanthera is derived from the Ancient Greek words coleos, meaning "a scabbard of a sword" and anthera meaning "an anther", alluding to the arrangement of the anthers, joined around the style, which protrudes like the hilt of a sword.

== Species ==
The following 3 species were formerly included in Coleanthera:

- Coleanthera coelophylla (A.Cunn. ex DC.) Benth. (now Styphelia coelophylla)
- Coleanthera myrtoides Stschegl. (now Styphelia coelophylla)
- Coleanthera virgata Stschegl. (now Styphelia lanata)
