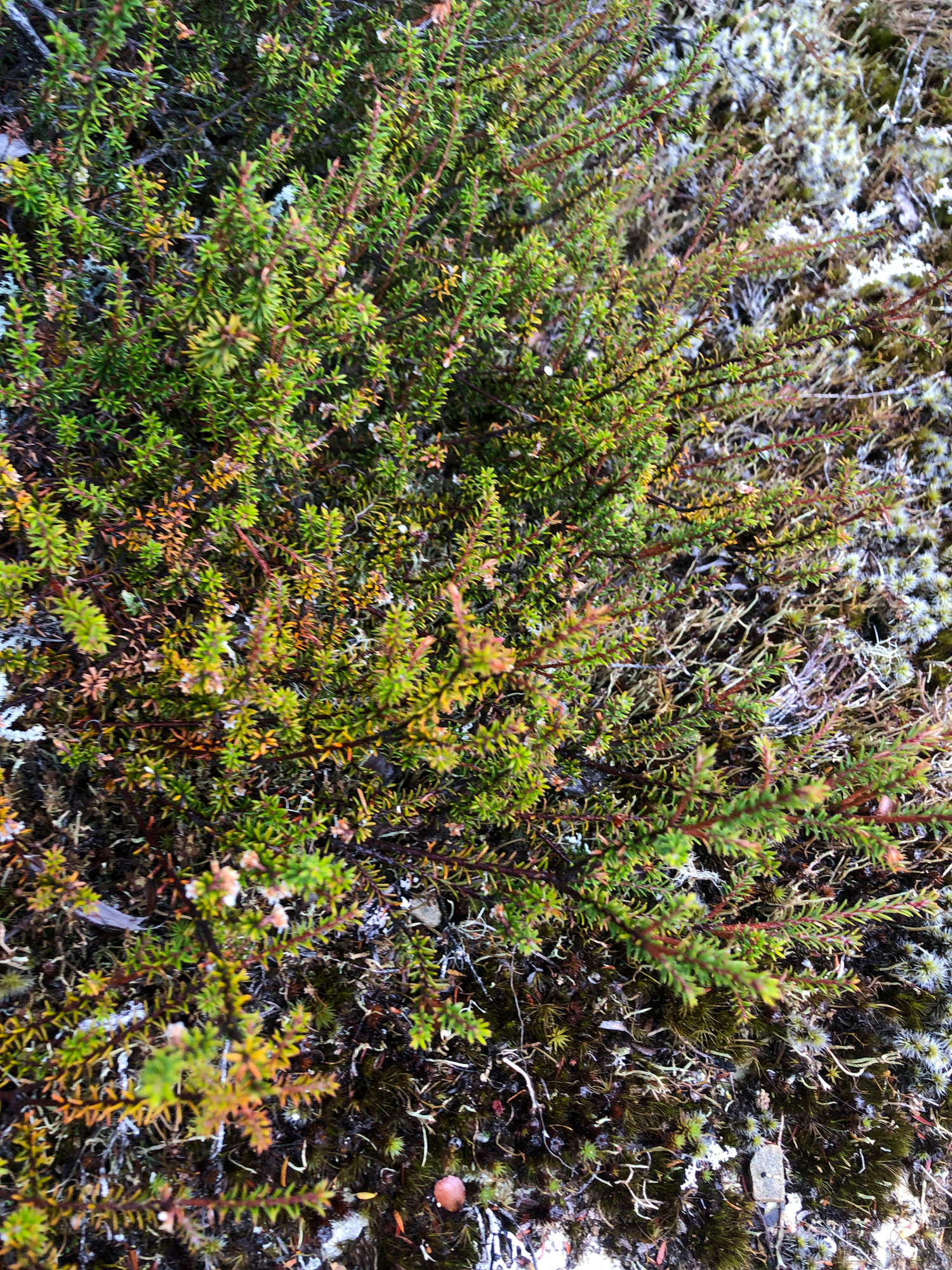
- Androstoma empetrifolium in Nelson Lakes National Park

Conservation status
- Not Threatened (NZ TCS)

Scientific classification
- Kingdom: Plantae
- Clade: Tracheophytes
- Clade: Angiosperms
- Clade: Eudicots
- Clade: Asterids
- Order: Ericales
- Family: Ericaceae
- Genus: Androstoma
- Species: A. empetrifolium

Binomial name
- Androstoma empetrifolium Hook.f.

= Androstoma empetrifolium =

Species of flowering plants

Androstoma empetrifolium, or bog mingimingi, is a species of plant endemic to New Zealand.

== Description ==
Similar to mingimingis with leafy branches with alternating, short leaves. Shrubby, with red fruits.

== Range ==
Known from across New Zealand, on all three major islands and on some of the outlying groups.

== Habitat ==
This species is known to live on the coast to alpine environments, and is normally associated with wetland or bog, as the English name suggests. It can also be found on poorly-drained rocky areas at the alpine level.

== Ecology ==
The fruits are dispersed by frugivory, but there are no known studies that show what animals disperse the seeds.

== Taxonomy ==
Androstoma was previously considered monotypic, until a 2005 study moved some other species, including one from Tasmania, into the genus.
