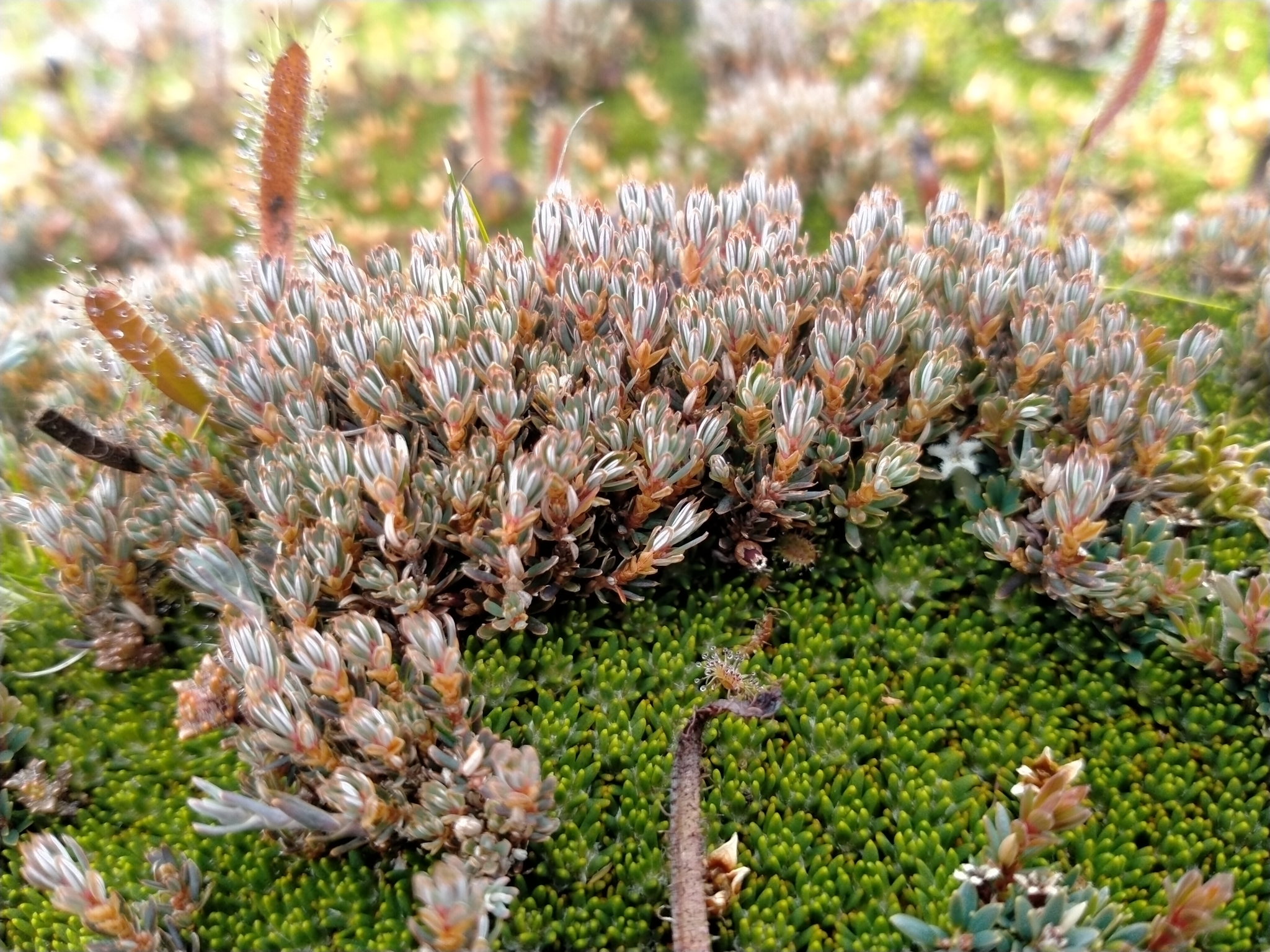

Scientific classification
- Kingdom: Plantae
- Clade: Tracheophytes
- Clade: Angiosperms
- Clade: Eudicots
- Clade: Asterids
- Order: Ericales
- Family: Ericaceae
- Genus: Montitega
- Species: M. dealbata

Binomial name
- Montitega dealbata (R.Br.) C.M.Weiller (2010)
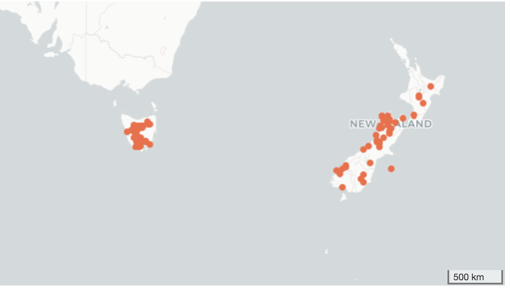
- Distribution of M. dealbata from the Atlas of Living Australia

Synonyms
- Cyathodes dealbata R.Br (1810); Styphelia dealbata (R.Br.) Spreng (1824)

= Montitega dealbata =

Species of alpine plant

Montitega dealbata is a dense mat-forming plant native to Tasmania and New Zealand. The whitish underside of the 3–5mm long and 1–2mm wide leaves distinguish this species from the similar alpine plant Pentachondra pumila.

== Description ==
M. dealbata is a small prostrate woody shrub, part of the Ericaceae family, that forms dense, cushion-like mats of up to 400mm wide and 30mm tall. It has numerous, close-set branchlets, and small, close-set leaves. The leaves are imbricate, or overlapping, coriaceous, or leather-like, free from hair, and form a narrow elliptic or oblong shape.

== Taxonomy ==
Montitega dealbata was previously known as Cyathodes dealbata R.Br. The Cyathodes genus was first described in 1805, with the first documentation of Cyathodes dealbata in 1810, along with two other species; C. parvifolia and C. straminea. In 2010, Montitega dealbata was identified to have no close relationship with the Cyathodes, and instead is a sister species to Monotoca genus. This led to a new monotypic genus in the Ericaceae family, Montitega (C.M.Weiller) being created.

== Distribution ==
It is found in Tasmania and New Zealand and is a strictly an alpine species in the northern parts of its range but can be found down to sea level in the southern extents.
