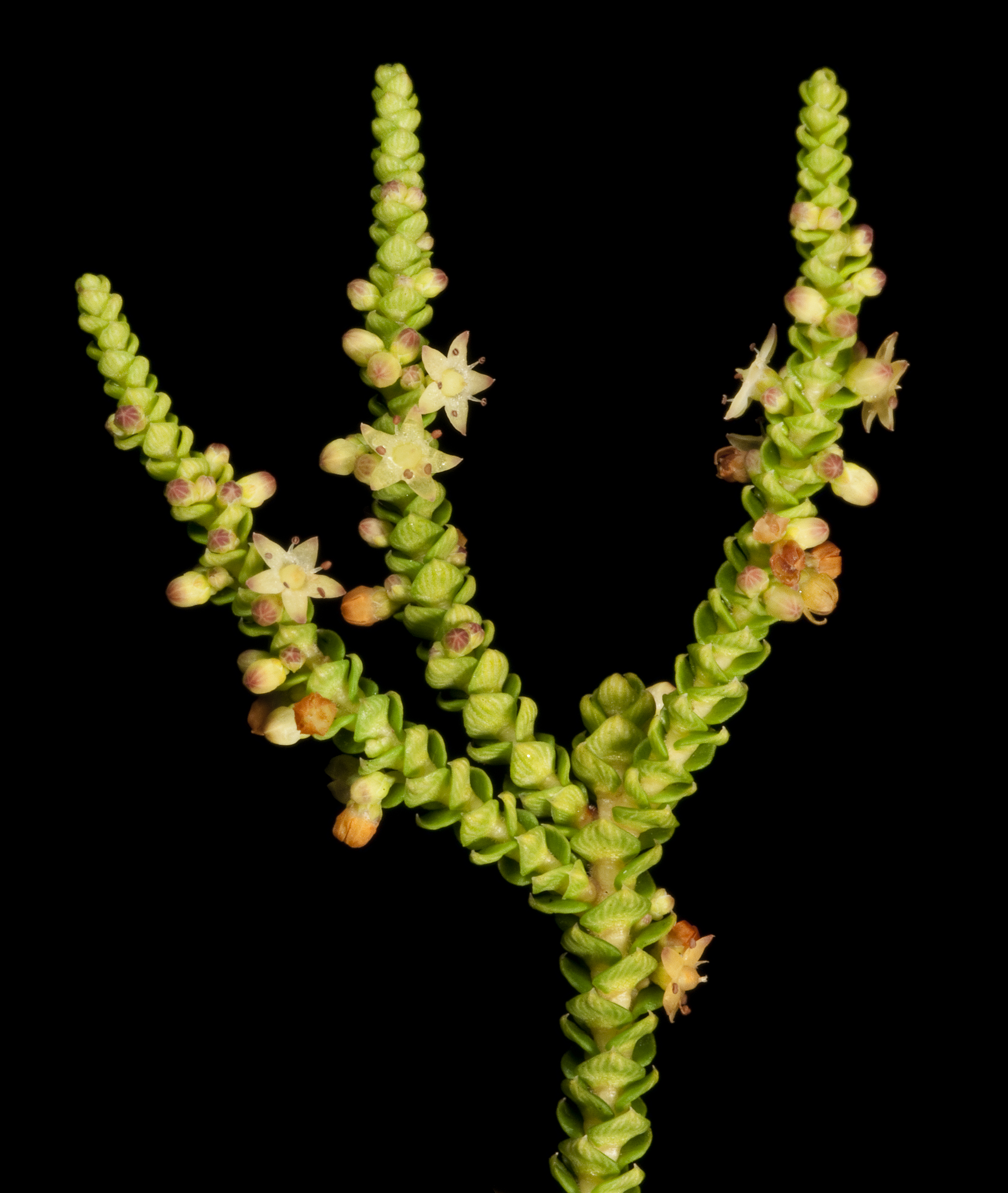
- Dielsiodoxa propullulans

Scientific classification
- Kingdom: Plantae
- Clade: Tracheophytes
- Clade: Angiosperms
- Clade: Eudicots
- Clade: Asterids
- Order: Ericales
- Family: Ericaceae
- Subfamily: Epacridoideae
- Tribe: Oligarrheneae
- Genus: Dielsiodoxa; Albr.

= Dielsiodoxa =

Genus of flowering plants

Dielsiodoxa is a small genus of flowering plants in the family Ericaceae.

The species, all endemic to Western Australia, include:

- Dielsiodoxa leucantha (E.Pritz.) Albr. syn. Monotoca leucantha
- Dielsiodoxa lycopodioides Albr.
- Dielsiodoxa oligarrhenoides (F.Muell.) Albr.
- Dielsiodoxa propullulans Albr.
- Dielsiodoxa tamariscina (F.Muell.) Albr.

The genus was first formally described in 2010.
