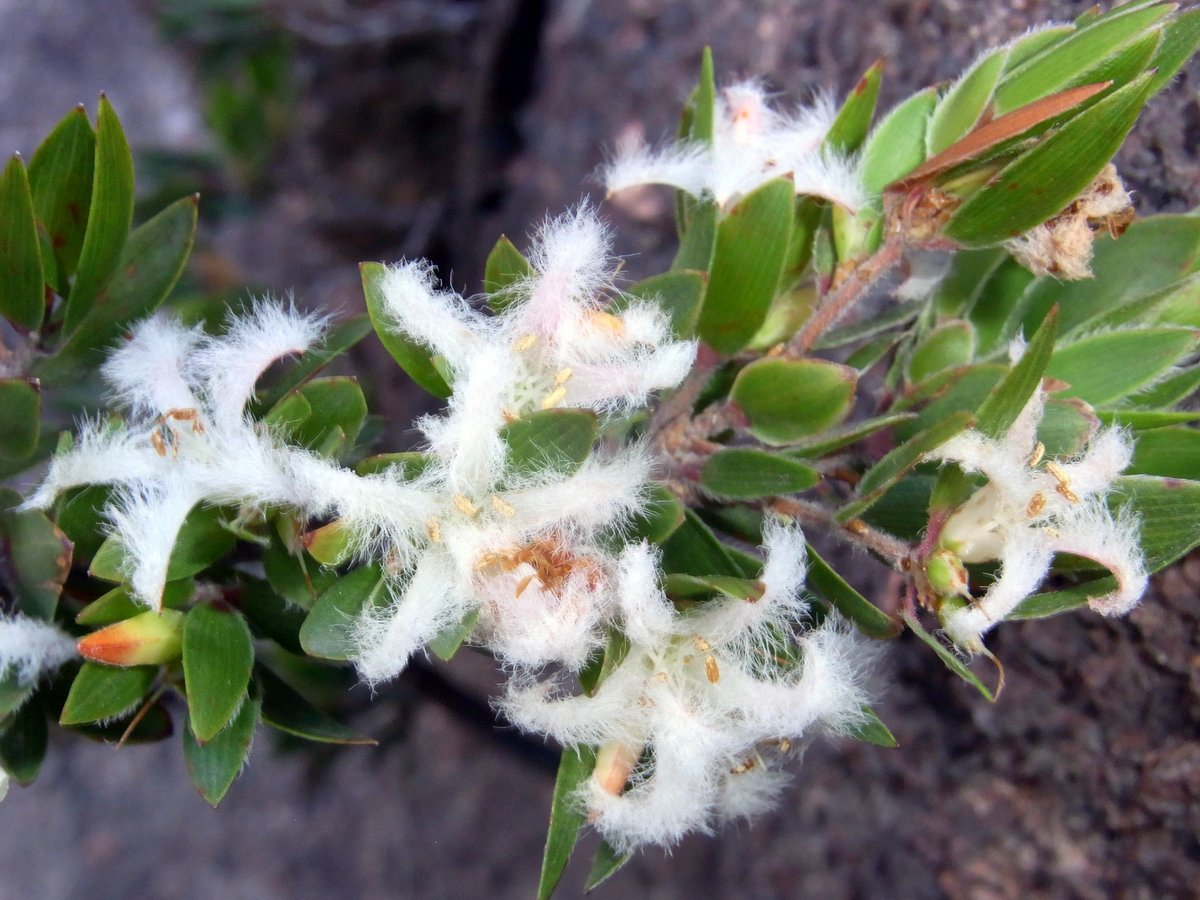
- Freycinet National Park, Australia

Scientific classification
- Kingdom: Plantae
- Clade: Tracheophytes
- Clade: Angiosperms
- Clade: Eudicots
- Clade: Asterids
- Order: Ericales
- Family: Ericaceae
- Genus: Pentachondra
- Species: P. involucrata

Binomial name
- Pentachondra involucrata R.Br.

= Pentachondra involucrata =

Species of flowering plant

Pentachondra involucrata, the forest frilly-heath, is a small Tasmanian plant in the family Ericaceae.

The specific epithet involucrata is derived from Latin, translated as "wrapper". It refers to the involucral bract, a whorl of bracts below the flower. It first appeared in scientific literature in 1810, in Prodromus Florae Novae Hollandiae, authored by the prolific Scottish botanist, Robert Brown.
