= Needhamiella =

Scientific classification
- Kingdom: Plantae
- Clade: Tracheophytes
- Clade: Angiosperms
- Clade: Eudicots
- Clade: Asterids
- Order: Ericales
- Family: Ericaceae
- Subfamily: Epacridoideae
- Tribe: Oligarrheneae
- Genus: Needhamiella; L.Watson
- Species: N. pumilio

Binomial name
- Needhamiella pumilio L. Watson

Synonyms
- Monotoca pumilio (R.Br.) Spreng.; Needhamia R. Br. 1810 nom. illeg.; Needhamia pumilio R.Br. nom. illeg.

Genus of shrubs

Needhamiella is a monotypic genus in the family Ericaceae. The sole species, Needhamiella pumilio, is a small shrub that is endemic to Western Australia.

The genus was first formally described in 1810 by botanist Robert Brown who gave it the name Needhamia. This was subsequently declared an illegitimate name as Italian naturalist Giovanni Antonio Scopoli had assigned it to a genus in the family Leguminosae in 1777. In 1965 the genus was given the revised name Needhamiella.
