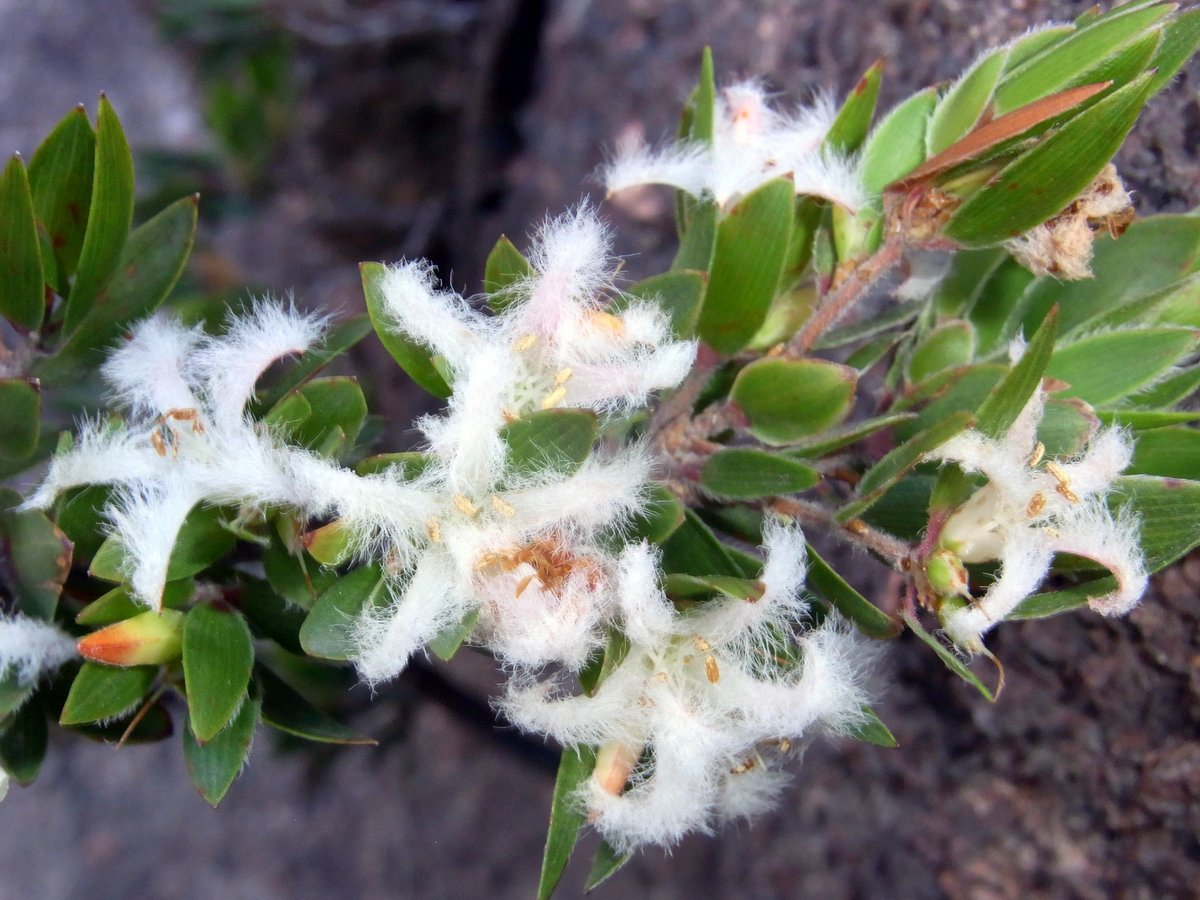
- Pentachondra involucrata

Scientific classification
- Kingdom: Plantae
- Clade: Tracheophytes
- Clade: Angiosperms
- Clade: Eudicots
- Clade: Asterids
- Order: Ericales
- Family: Ericaceae
- Subfamily: Epacridoideae
- Tribe: Styphelieae
- Genus: Pentachondra; R.Br.

= Pentachondra =

Genus of shrubs

Pentachondra is a genus of prostrate shrubs in the family Ericaceae. The genus is native to Australia and New Zealand.

Species include:

- Pentachondra dehiscens Cherry
- Pentachondra ericifolia Hook.f.
- Pentachondra involucrata R.Br.
- Pentachondra pumila (J.R.Forst. & G.Forst.) R.Br.
