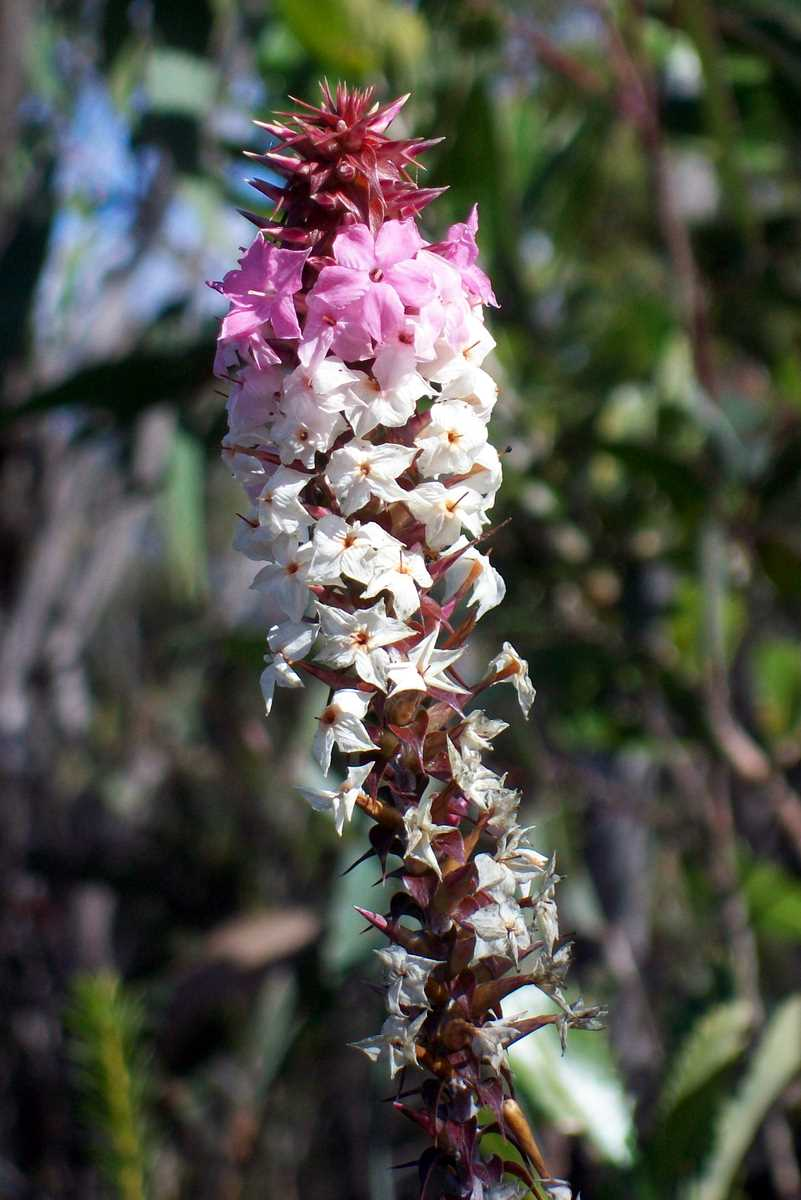
- In Blue Mountains National Park

Scientific classification
- Kingdom: Plantae
- Clade: Tracheophytes
- Clade: Angiosperms
- Clade: Eudicots
- Clade: Asterids
- Order: Ericales
- Family: Ericaceae
- Subfamily: Epacridoideae
- Tribe: Epacrideae
- Genus: Woollsia; F.Muell.
- Species: W. pungens

Binomial name
- Woollsia pungens (Cav.) F.Muell.

= Woollsia =

Genus of shrubs

Woollsia pungens, commonly known as snow heath, is the sole species in the flowering plant genus Woollsia in the family Ericaceae and is endemic to eastern Australia. It is a small shrub with egg-shaped leaves with a heart-shaped base, white to dark pink, tube-shaped flowers and small capsules containing many small seeds.

== Description ==
Woollsia pungens is an erect shrub that typically grows to a height of 0.2–2 m (7.9 in – 6 ft 6.7 in) and has hairy stems. The leaves are egg-shaped, 3.5–12 mm (0.14–0.47 in) long and 1.5–6 mm (0.059–0.236 in) wide on a petiole up to 1 mm (0.039 in) long, and have a rounded to heart-shaped base and a sharp point on the end. The flowers are white to dark pink, 8–13 mm (0.31–0.51 in) in diameter and sweetly-scented. There are hairy bracts and sepals 8–10 mm (0.31–0.39 in) long. The petals are joined at the base, forming a tube 7–14 mm (0.28–0.55 in) long with spreading lobes 4–5 mm (0.16–0.20 in) long. Flowering occurs in most months, and the fruit is a capsule about 2.5 mm (0.098 in) in diameter, containing many small seeds.

== Taxonomy ==
Antonio José Cavanilles described the species as Epacris pungens in 1797, from material collected in the Sydney district. Victorian state botanist Ferdinand von Mueller proposed the new genus Woollsia in 1873 in his Fragmenta Phytographiae Australiae, though did not publish its new binomial name (Woollsia pungens) until 1875. The genus name (Woollsia) honours William Woolls and the specific epithet (pungens) means "ending in a sharp, hard point".

Genetic analysis indicates that this species is an early offshoot of a lineage that includes Lysinema ciliatum and the genus Epacris.

== Distribution and habitat ==
Woollsia pungens grows in heathland with such species as saw banksia (Banksia serrata), mountain devil (Lambertia formosa), grasstree (Xanthorrhoea resinifera), and open sclerophyll forest under such trees as Sydney peppermint (Eucalyptus piperita), scribbly gum (E. haemastoma) and red bloodwood (Corymbia gummifera). It grows along the coast and in the upper Blue Mountains from Pigeon House Mountain in southern New South Wales to south-east Queensland.

== Ecology ==
Plants are thought to live 10–20 years in the wild. They are generally killed by bushfire, with new seedlings growing from seed stored in the soil.

== Use in horticulture ==
In cultivation, snow heath grows best in a part-shaded spot with good drainage and ample moisture. It can be propagated by cuttings or seed.
