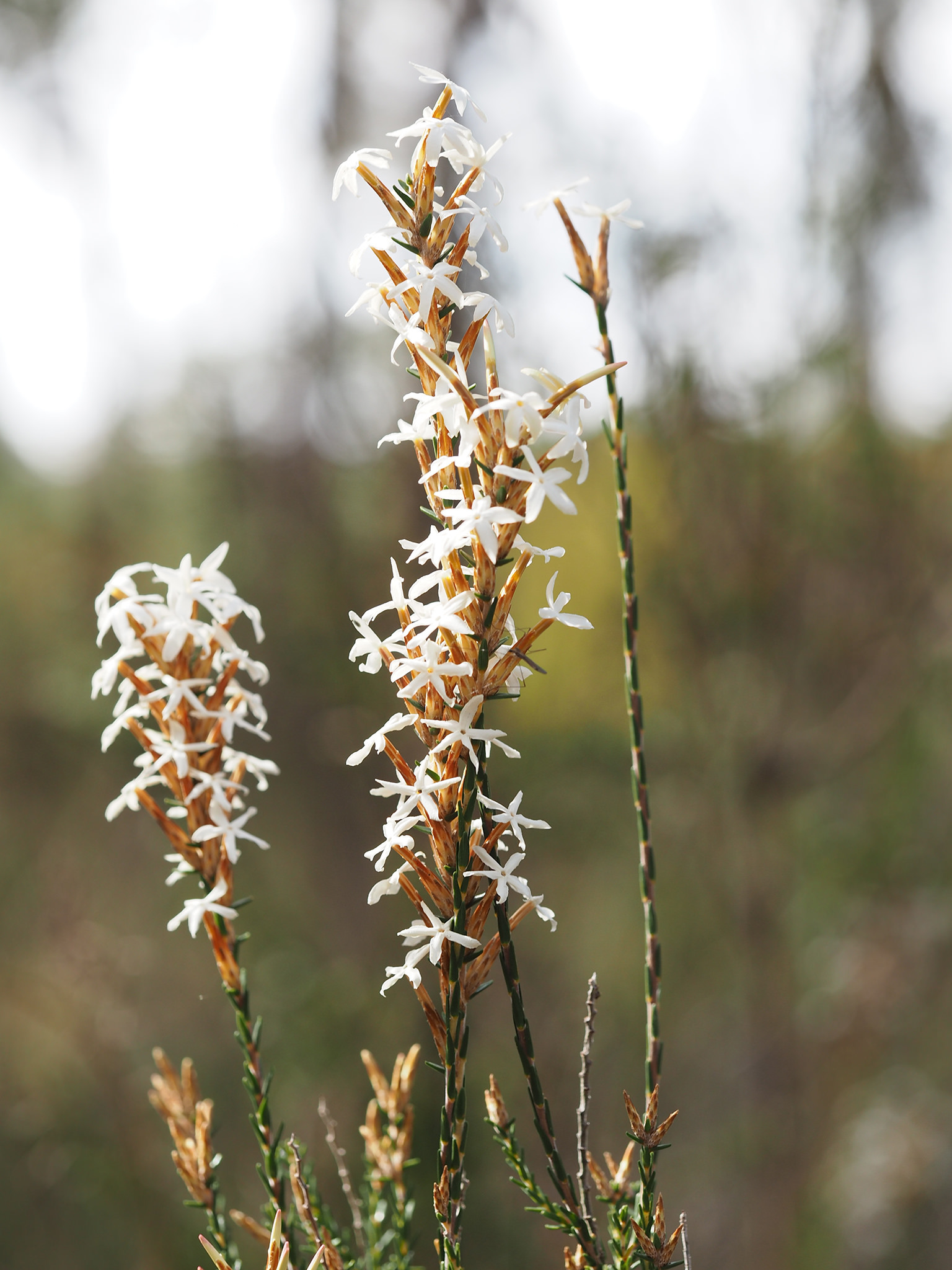

Scientific classification
- Kingdom: Plantae
- Clade: Tracheophytes
- Clade: Angiosperms
- Clade: Eudicots
- Clade: Asterids
- Order: Ericales
- Family: Ericaceae
- Subfamily: Epacridoideae
- Tribe: Epacrideae
- Genus: Lysinema; R.Br.

= Lysinema =

Genus of flowering plants

Lysinema is a small genus of flowering plants in the family Ericaceae.

The species, which are all endemic to the south west of Western Australia, include:

- Lysinema ciliatum R.Br. - Curry Flower
- Lysinema conspicuum R.Br.
- Lysinema elegans Sond.
- Lysinema fimbriatum F.Muell.
- Lysinema lasianthum R.Br.
- Lysinema pentapetalum R.Br.

The genus was formally described in 1810 by botanist Robert Brown.
