= Planocarpa =

Scientific classification
- Kingdom: Plantae
- Clade: Tracheophytes
- Clade: Angiosperms
- Clade: Eudicots
- Clade: Asterids
- Order: Ericales
- Family: Ericaceae
- Subfamily: Epacridoideae
- Tribe: Styphelieae
- Genus: Planocarpa; C.M.Weiller

Genus of plants

Planocarpa is a genus of flowering plants belonging to the family Ericaceae.

Its native range is Tasmania.

Species:

- Planocarpa nitida (Jarman) C.M.Weiller
- Planocarpa petiolaris (DC.) C.M.Weiller
- Planocarpa sulcata (Mihaich) C.M.Weiller
