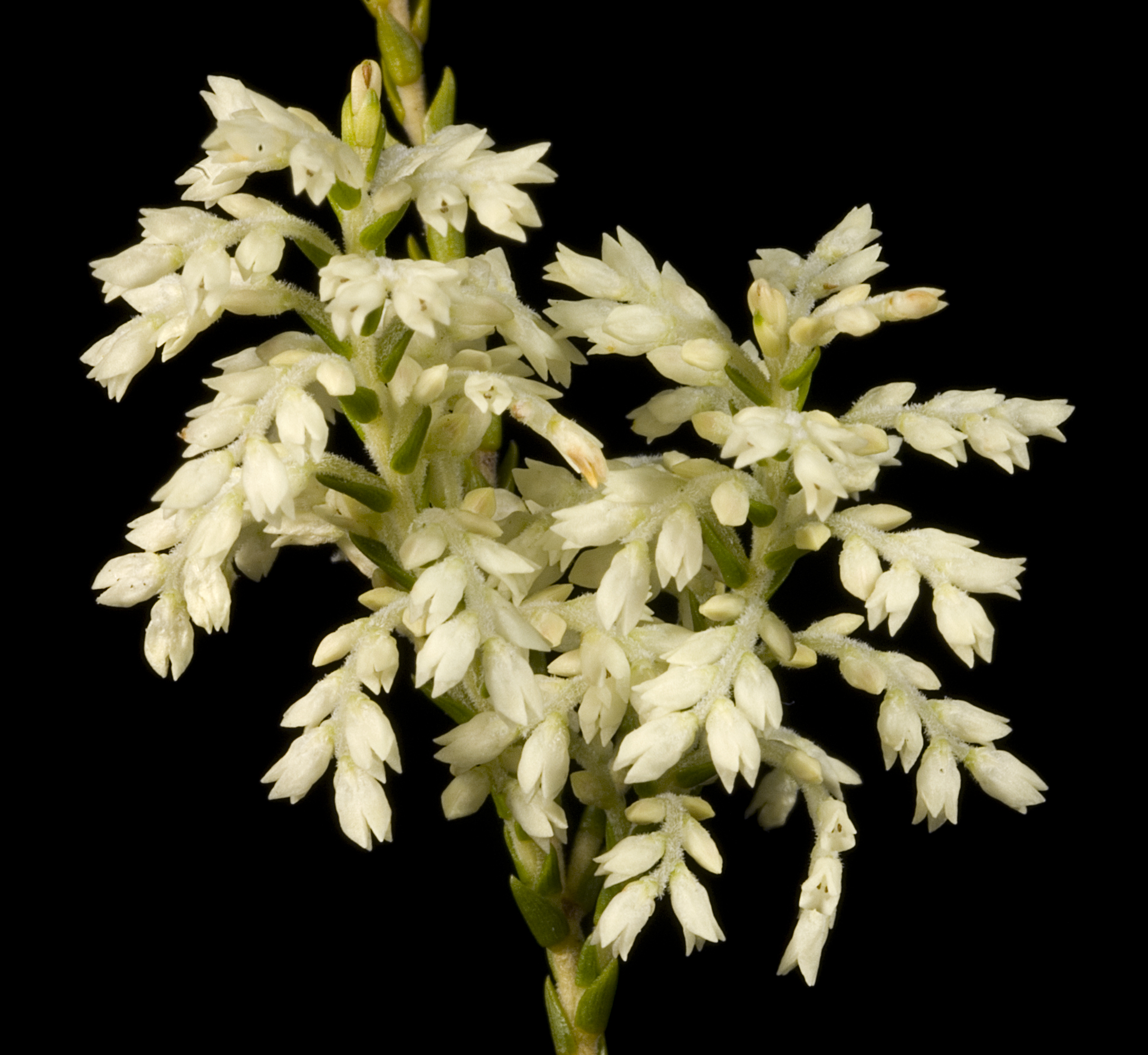
- Oligarrhena micrantha

Scientific classification
- Kingdom: Plantae
- Clade: Tracheophytes
- Clade: Angiosperms
- Clade: Eudicots
- Clade: Asterids
- Order: Ericales
- Family: Ericaceae
- Subfamily: Epacridoideae
- Tribe: Oligarrheneae
- Genus: Oligarrhena; R.Br.

= Oligarrhena =

Genus of plants

Oligarrhena is a genus of flowering plants belonging to the family Ericaceae.

Its native range is Western Australia.

Species:

- Oligarrhena micrantha R.Br.
