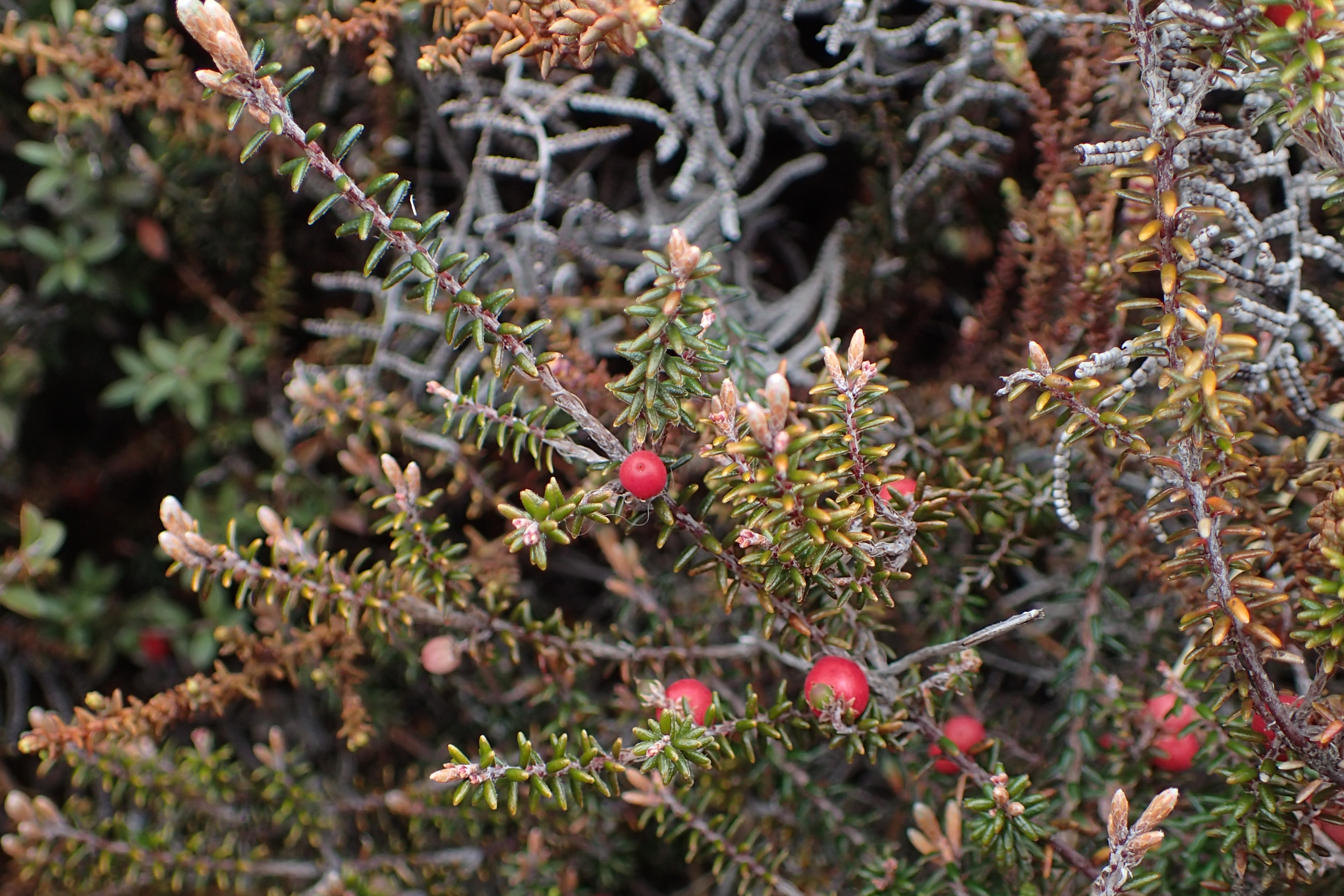
- Androstoma empetrifolium

Scientific classification
- Kingdom: Plantae
- Clade: Tracheophytes
- Clade: Angiosperms
- Clade: Eudicots
- Clade: Asterids
- Order: Ericales
- Family: Ericaceae
- Subfamily: Epacridoideae
- Tribe: Styphelieae
- Genus: Androstoma; Hook.f.

= Androstoma =

Genus of flowering plants

Androstoma is a genus of flowering plants belonging to the family Ericaceae.

Its native range is Tasmania and New Zealand.

Species:

- Androstoma empetrifolium Hook.f.
- Androstoma verticillatum (Hook.f.) Quinn
