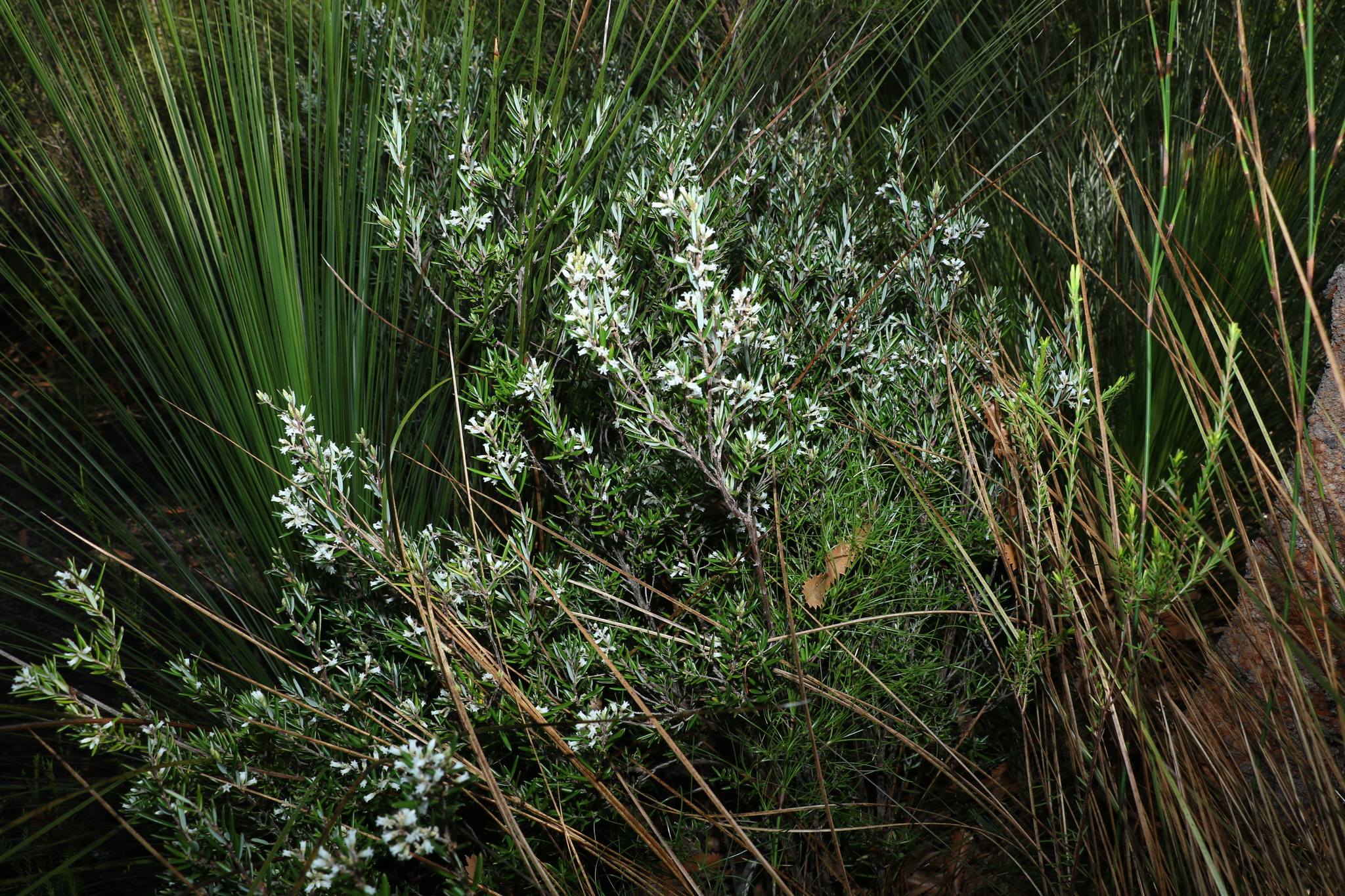
- Agiortia pedicellata

Scientific classification
- Kingdom: Plantae
- Clade: Tracheophytes
- Clade: Angiosperms
- Clade: Eudicots
- Clade: Asterids
- Order: Ericales
- Family: Ericaceae
- Subfamily: Epacridoideae
- Tribe: Styphelieae
- Genus: Agiortia; Quinn

= Agiortia =

Genus of flowering plants

Agiortia is a small genus of flowering plants in the family Ericaceae.

They are native to New South Wales and Queensland in Australia.

There are three species as follows:

- Agiortia cicatricata (J.M.Powell) Quinn syn. Leucopogon cicatricatus
- Agiortia pedicellata (C.T.White) Quinn syn. Leucopogon pedicellatus
- Agiortia pleiosperma (F.Muell.) Quinn syn. Leucopogon pleiospermus

The genus is closely related to Leucopogon.

The genus name of Agiortia is in honour of Despina (Fanias) Agioritis (1927–1994), an Australian botanist from Innisfail, Queensland. It was first described and published in Australian Systematic Botany in 2005.
