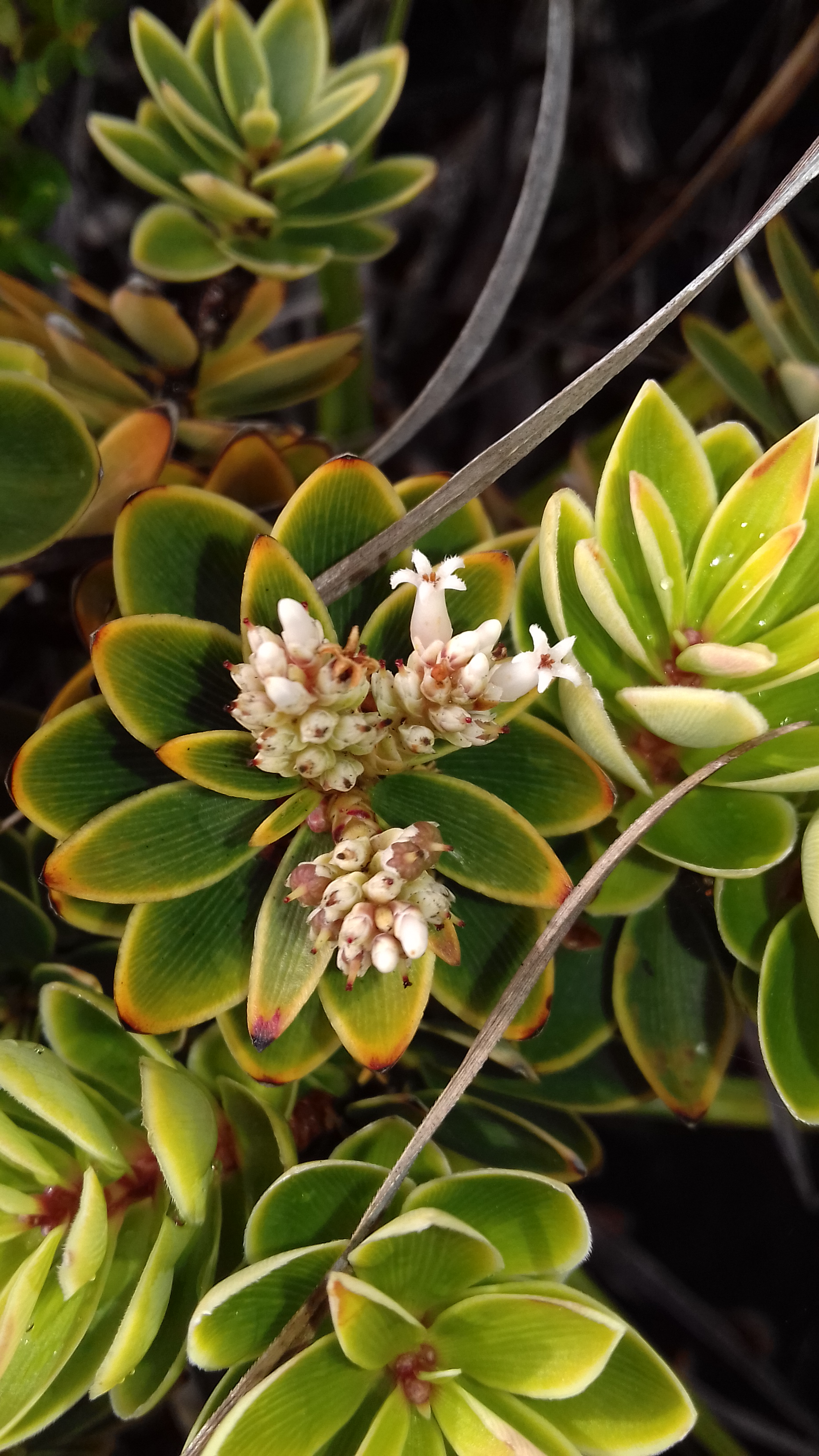

Conservation status
- Least Concern (IUCN 3.1)

Scientific classification
- Kingdom: Plantae
- Clade: Tracheophytes
- Clade: Angiosperms
- Clade: Eudicots
- Clade: Asterids
- Order: Ericales
- Family: Ericaceae
- Genus: Cyathopsis
- Species: C. albicans

Binomial name
- Cyathopsis albicans (Brongn. & Gris) Quinn

Synonyms
- Leucopogon albicans Brongn. & Gris; Leucopogon scariosus Pancher ex Brongn. & Gris; Styphelia albicans (Brongn. & Gris) Sleumer

= Cyathopsis albicans =

Species of plant

Cyathopsis albicans is a species of plant in the family Ericaceae, endemic to New Caledonia. It was first described as Leucopogon albicans in 1864 by Adolphe-Théodore Brongniart and Jean Antoine Arthur Gris, and transferred to Cyathopsis in 2005 by Christopher John Quinn.
