= Lebetanthus =

Scientific classification
- Kingdom: Plantae
- Clade: Tracheophytes
- Clade: Angiosperms
- Clade: Eudicots
- Clade: Asterids
- Order: Ericales
- Family: Ericaceae
- Subfamily: Epacridoideae
- Tribe: Prionoteae
- Genus: Lebetanthus; Endl.

Genus of plants

Lebetanthus is a genus of flowering plants belonging to the family Ericaceae.

Its native range is Southern Chile to Southern Argentina.

== Species ==
Species:

- Lebetanthus myrsinites (Lam.) Macloskie
