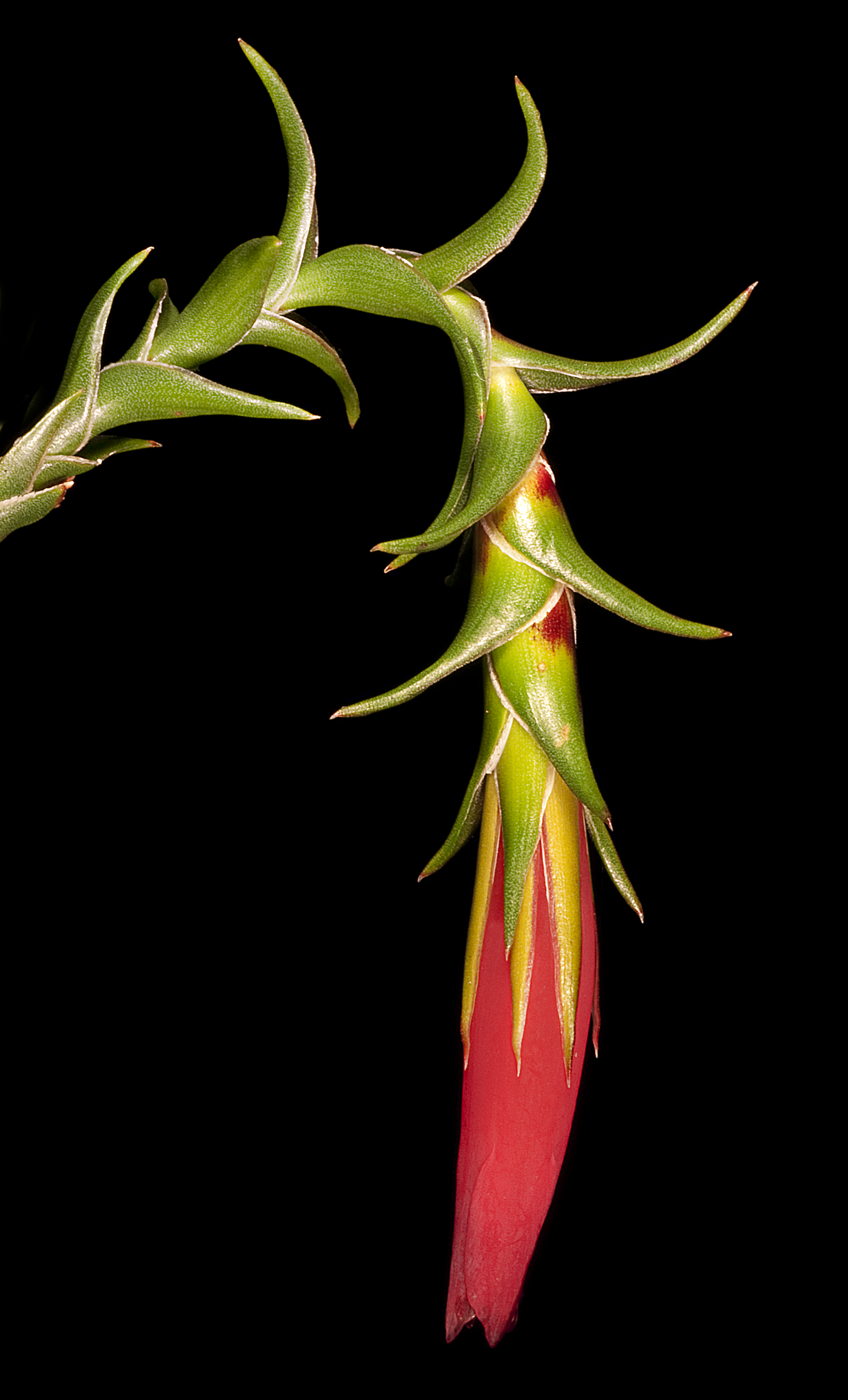
- Cosmelia rubra

Scientific classification
- Kingdom: Plantae
- Clade: Tracheophytes
- Clade: Angiosperms
- Clade: Eudicots
- Clade: Asterids
- Order: Ericales
- Family: Ericaceae
- Subfamily: Epacridoideae
- Tribe: Cosmelieae
- Genus: Cosmelia; R.Br.
- Species: C. rubra

Binomial name
- Cosmelia rubra R.Br.

= Cosmelia =

Genus of flowering plants

Cosmelia is a monotypic genus of flowering plants in the family Ericaceae. The sole species is Cosmelia rubra, commonly known as spindle heath, found in swampy sites in the south-west of Western Australia.

The genus was formally described in 1810 by botanist Robert Brown.
