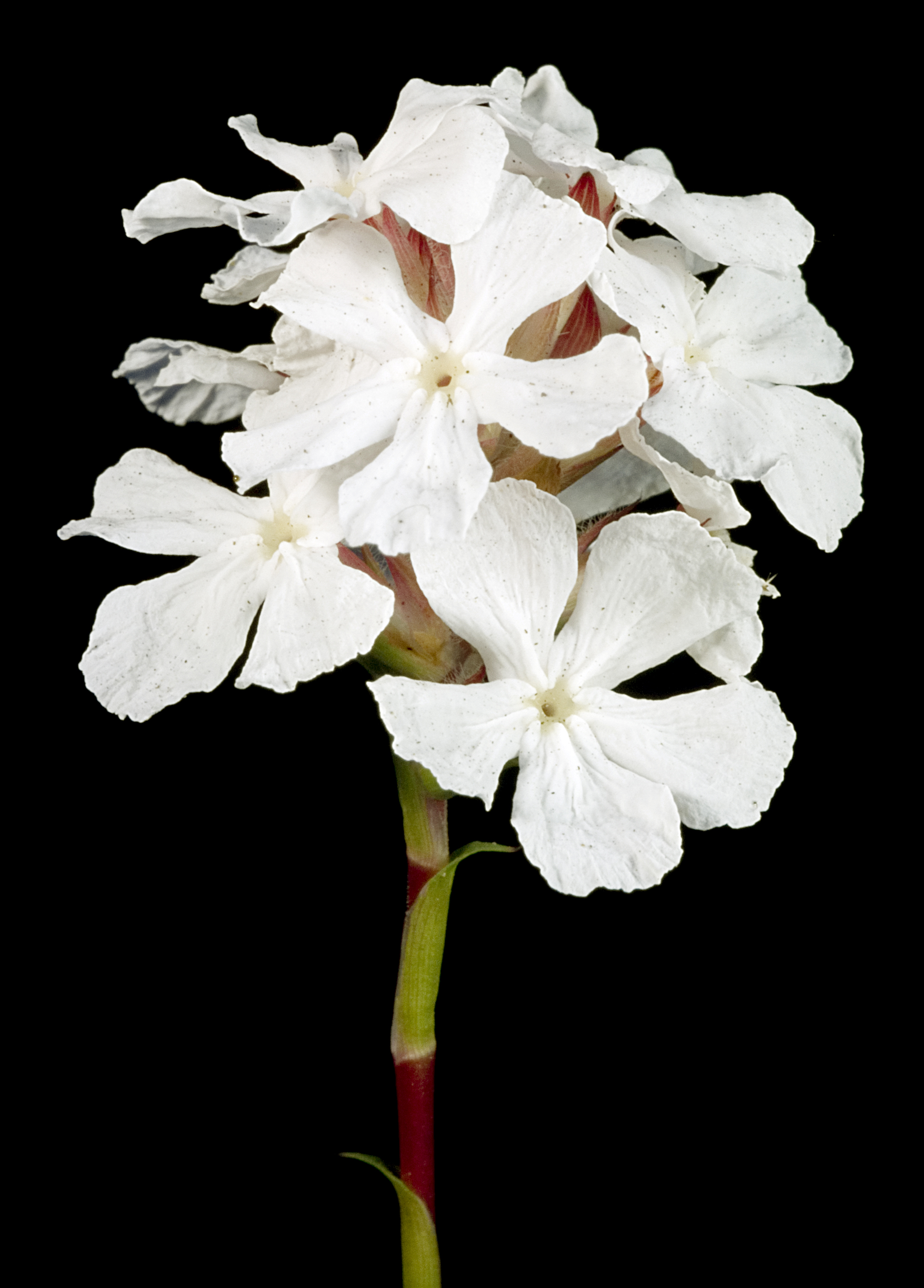

Scientific classification
- Kingdom: Plantae
- Clade: Tracheophytes
- Clade: Angiosperms
- Clade: Eudicots
- Clade: Asterids
- Order: Ericales
- Family: Ericaceae
- Subfamily: Epacridoideae
- Tribe: Richeeae
- Genus: Sphenotoma; Sweet

= Sphenotoma =

Genus of plants

Sphenotoma is a genus of flowering plants belonging to the family Ericaceae.

Its native range is Southwestern Australia.

Species:

- Sphenotoma capitata (R.Br.) Lindl.
- Sphenotoma dracophylloides Sond.
- Sphenotoma drummondii (Benth.) F.Muell.
- Sphenotoma gracilis (R.Br.) Sweet
- Sphenotoma parviflora (F.Muell. ex Benth.) F.Muell.
- Sphenotoma squarrosa (R.Br.) G.Don
