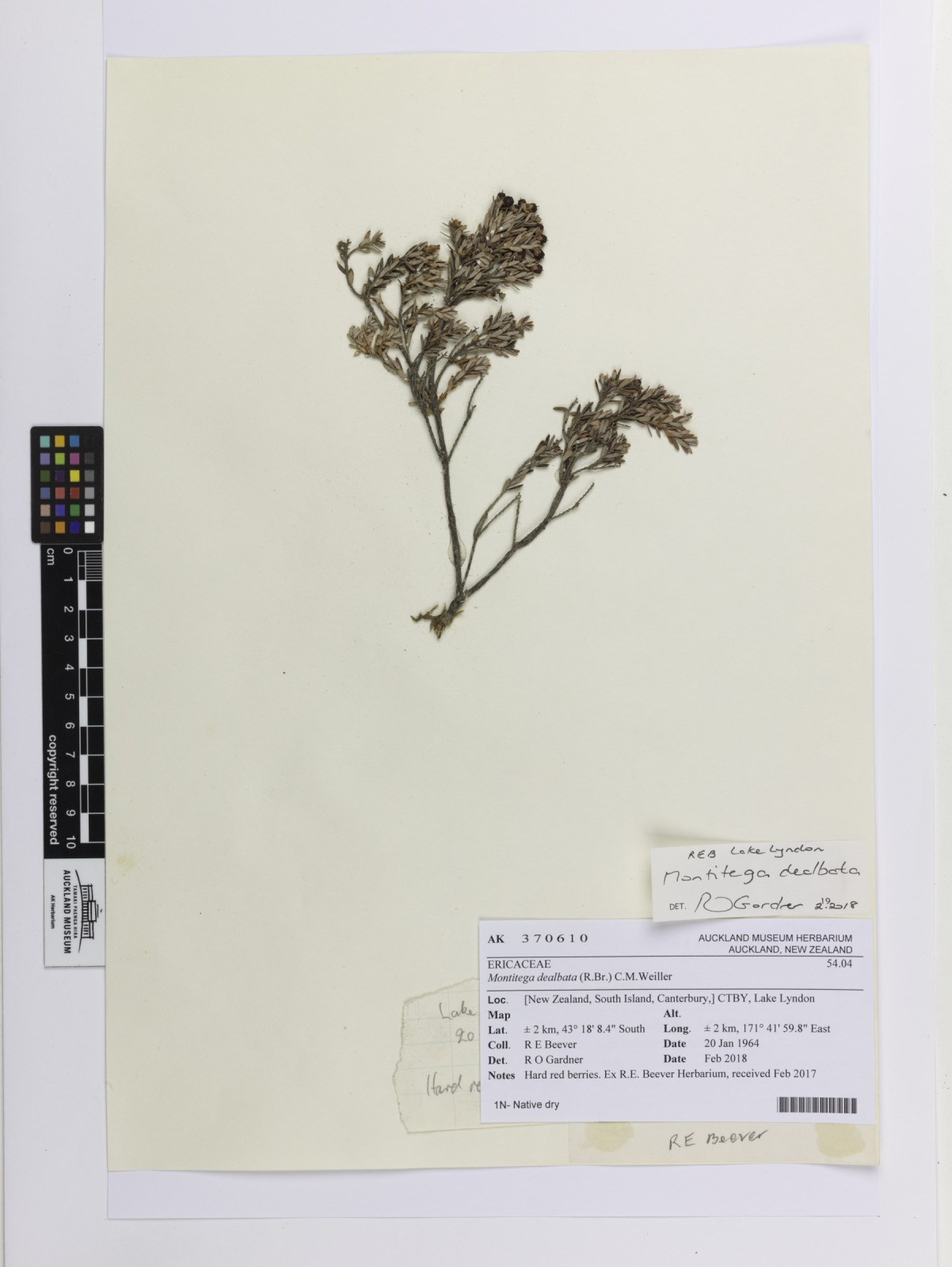
- Montitega dealbata

Scientific classification
- Kingdom: Plantae
- Clade: Tracheophytes
- Clade: Angiosperms
- Clade: Eudicots
- Clade: Asterids
- Order: Ericales
- Family: Ericaceae
- Subfamily: Epacridoideae
- Tribe: Styphelieae
- Genus: Montitega; C.M.Weiller

= Montitega =

Genus of plants

Montitega is a genus of flowering plants belonging to the family Ericaceae.

== Habitat ==
From sea level to alpine zones on poorly drained ground or peat bogs amongst other cushion-plants, shrubs and grasses. In northern part of its range this species is strictly alpine.

== Distribution ==
Indigenous. Australia (Tasmania) and New Zealand (North, South and Stewart Islands).

== Flowering ==
- Flowering time: January – March
- Flowering color: white
- Fruiting: January – April

== Species ==
- Montitega dealbata (R.Br.) C.M.Weiller
