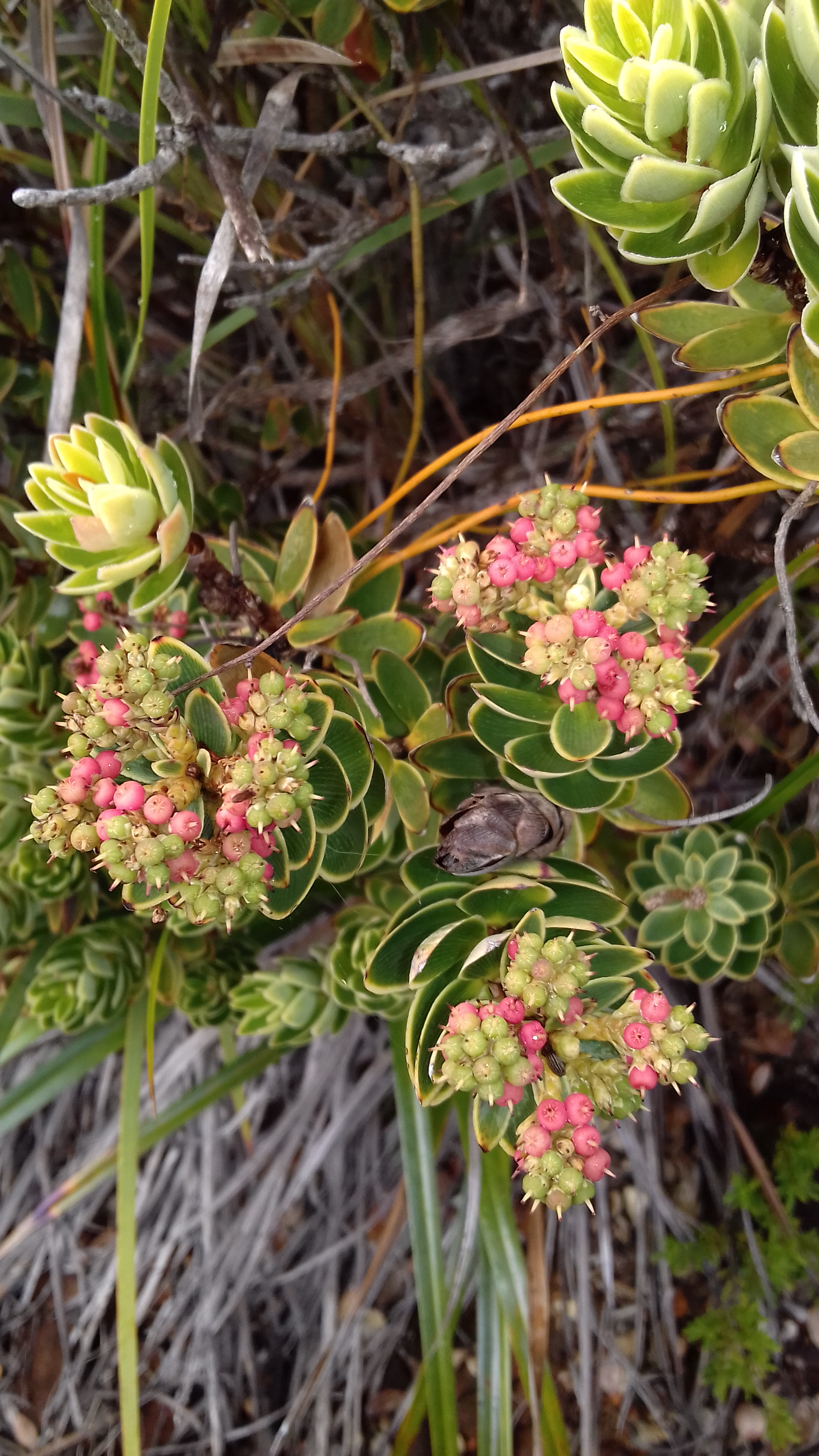
- Cyathopsis albicans

Scientific classification
- Kingdom: Plantae
- Clade: Tracheophytes
- Clade: Angiosperms
- Clade: Eudicots
- Clade: Asterids
- Order: Ericales
- Family: Ericaceae
- Subfamily: Epacridoideae
- Tribe: Styphelieae
- Genus: Cyathopsis; Brongn. & Gris

Species
- See text.

= Cyathopsis =

Genus of flowering plants

Cyathopsis is a genus of shrubs in the family Ericaceae. The genus is endemic to New Caledonia in the Pacific and contains three species that have previously been included in Styphelia. It is related to genera such as Leucopogon, Lissanthe and Styphelia.

== Species ==
As of October 2022, Plants of the World Online accepted three species:

- Cyathopsis albicans (Brongn. & Gris) Quinn
- Cyathopsis floribunda (Brongn. & Gris
- Cyathopsis violaceospicata (Guillaumin) Quinn
