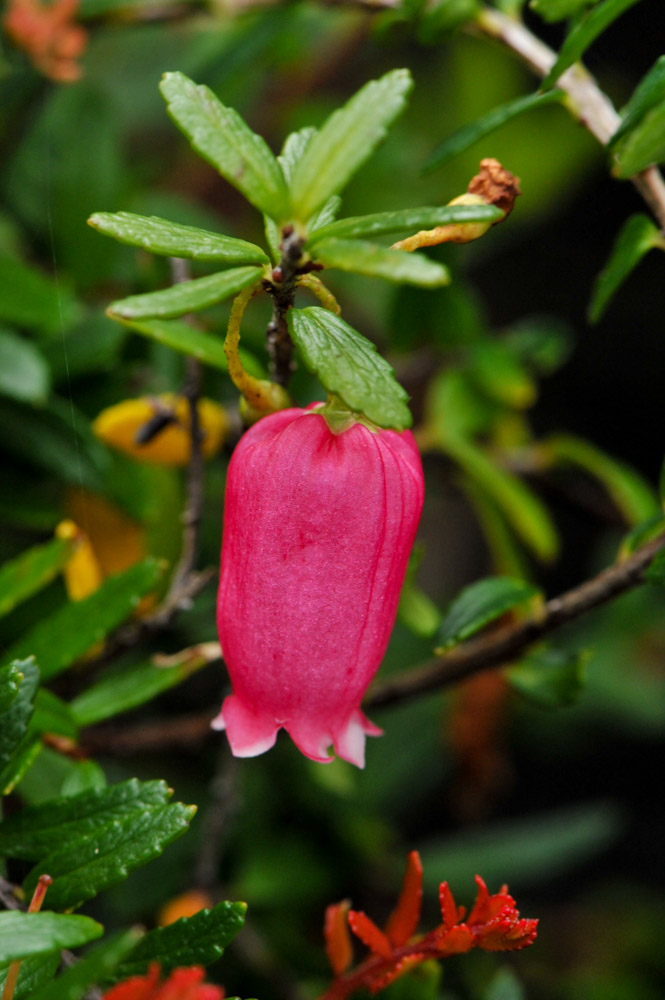

Conservation status
- Least Concern (IUCN 3.1)

Scientific classification
- Kingdom: Plantae
- Clade: Tracheophytes
- Clade: Angiosperms
- Clade: Eudicots
- Clade: Asterids
- Order: Ericales
- Family: Ericaceae
- Subfamily: Epacridoideae
- Tribe: Prionoteae
- Genus: Prionotes; R.Br.
- Species: P. cerinthoides

Binomial name
- Prionotes cerinthoides (Labill.) R.Br.

Synonyms
- Epacris cerinthoides Labill.

= Prionotes =

Genus of flowering plants

Prionotes is a genus of flowering plants endemic to Tasmania, with a single species, Prionotes cerinthoides. Commonly known as climbing heath, it is a temperate rainforest climber or a small scrambling shrub in the mountains. It usually lives in very wet, undisturbed places.

== Description ==
Its wiry stem is about 1 meter long. The glossy deep green leaves are 0.8–2 cm long, fairly crowded, elliptical in shape with shallowly-toothed margins, without parallel veins. The deep pink tubular flowers are bell shaped with 5 petals. They are up to 2.5 cm long by 1-1.2 cm wide, and constricted at the mouth. They are pendent, often clustered, and usually appear in summer and autumn. The fruit is a woody capsule, opening by 5 valves with many seeds in each part. P. cerinthoides is self-compatible and bird pollinated.

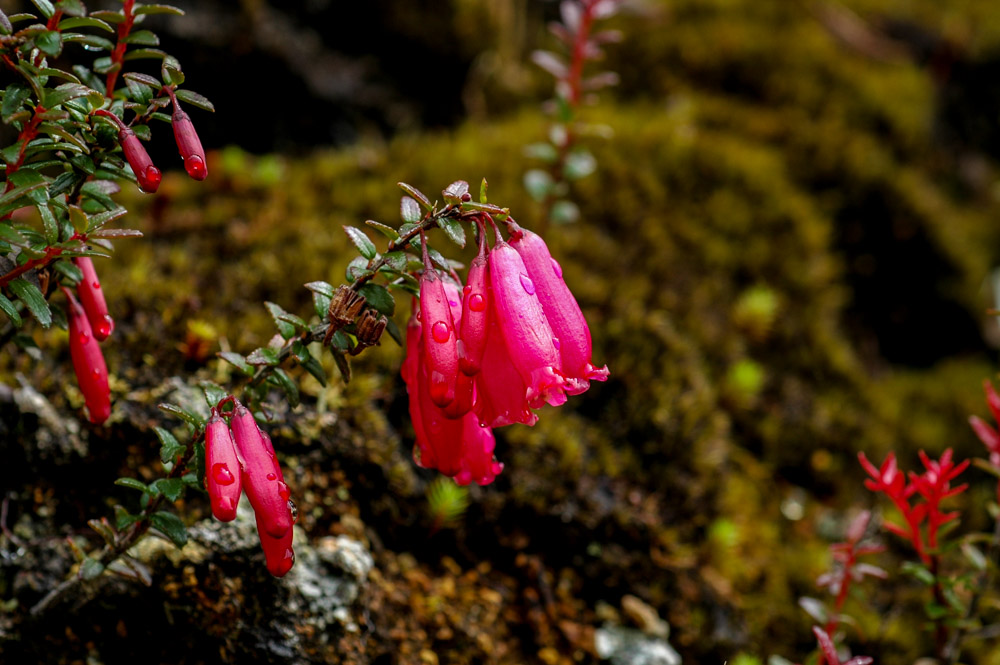
A group of Prionotes cerinthoides flower.

== Habitat and distribution ==
The plant family Ericaceae (heaths and heathers) is widespread in many parts of the globe, particularly Europe and South Africa. It contains a number of widely cultivated plants such as Erica, Rhododendron and Pieris. Like most of Australia's members of the Ericaceae, Prionotes belongs to the subfamily Epacridoideae, which was formerly classified as a separate family, the Epacridaceae. Prionotes consists of the single species, P.cerinthoides, which is endemic to Tasmania. Prionotes cerinthoides is endemic to temperate rainforest, subalpine, and alpine plant communities in Tasmania, Australia.

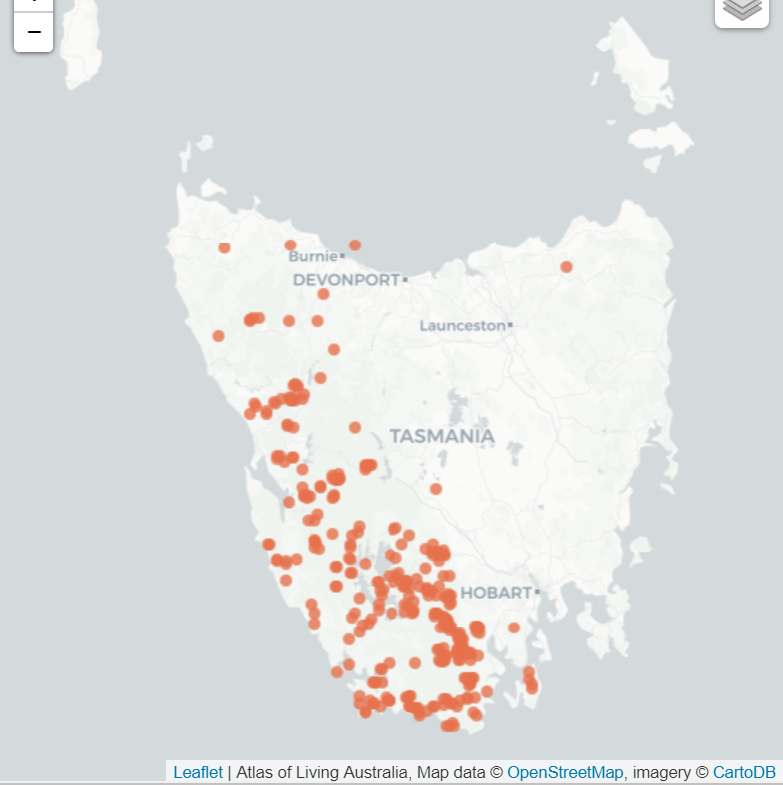
Distribution of Prionotes cerinthoides from Atlas of Living Australia

Prionotes cerinthoides is a slender, perennial climbing or epiphytic shrub that can climb the trunk, especially the Nothofagus cunninghamii. Prionotes cerinthoides is common in the rainforests of the west and south-west particularly montane areas and also occurs in alpine vegetation. This species grows best in acid soil (pH 4–5) and a cool, moist, shaded site is essential. It is sometimes referred to as the missing link between the family Epacridaceae (southern hemisphere heath family) and the Ericaceae (northern hemisphere heath family). The closest relative to Tasmania's climbing heath is a species found in the rainforests of Chile.

== Related research ==
The reproduction of Prionotes cerinthoides seems to be heavily dependent on a native bird species, the eastern spinebill (Acanthorhynchus tenuirostris). Because the nectar and pollen are sticky, Prionotes cerinthoides is not suitable for wind-pollination. At the same time, most bees rarely access this species due to the special shape of the corolla mouth. Currently, Prionotes cerinthoides is well preserved in the Tasmanian Wilderness World Heritage Area and other national parks in Tasmania, which means some habitat is moderately protected. The eastern spinebill, which can help pollination, is widely distributed.

== Formerly placed here ==
- Prionotes americana Hook., now included in Lebetanthus myrsinites
- Prionotes myrsinites (Lam.) Skottsb., now Lebetanthus myrsinites
- Prionotes secunda (R.Br.) Spreng., now Dracophyllum secundum
