= Decatoca =

Scientific classification
- Kingdom: Plantae
- Clade: Tracheophytes
- Clade: Angiosperms
- Clade: Eudicots
- Clade: Asterids
- Order: Ericales
- Family: Ericaceae
- Subfamily: Epacridoideae
- Tribe: Styphelieae
- Genus: Decatoca; F.Muell.

Genus of plants

Decatoca is a genus of flowering plants belonging to the family Ericaceae.

Its native range is New Guinea.

Species:

- Decatoca spenceri F.Muell.
