= Richea dracophylla =

Species of plant

Richea dracophylla, commonly known as dragon heath or pineapple candleheath, is an endemic shrub of Tasmania, Australia. It is widespread across the south-eastern regions of Tasmania, particularly in montane and subalpine environments. The species is names for its striking, spirally arranged leaves which resemble the scales of a dragon, and its dense candle-like floral spikes.

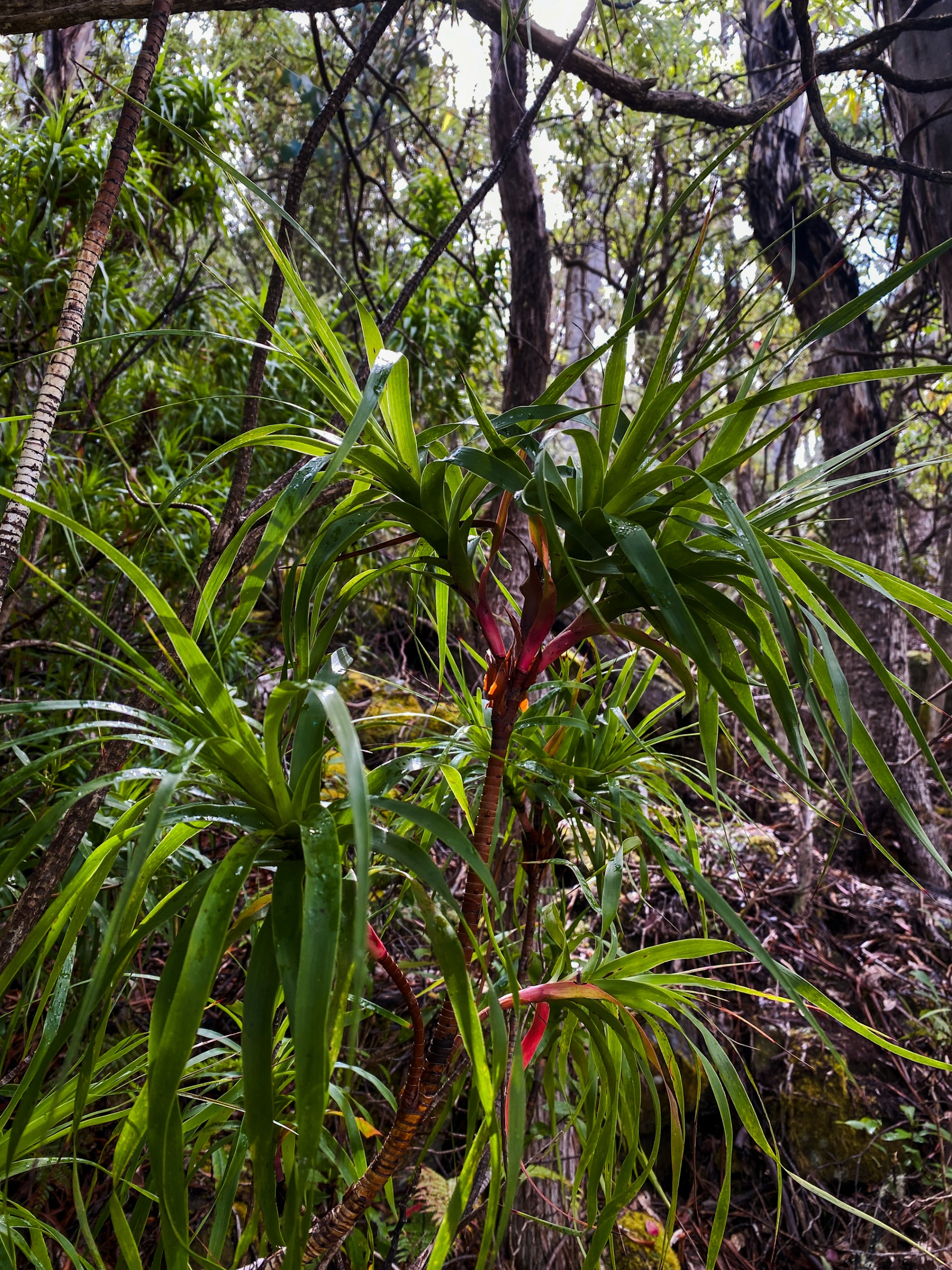
Shrub growing on Mt Wellington/Kunanyi

== Taxonomy and classification ==
Richea dracophylla is a species of woody shrub in the family Ericaceae, which includes other members of the genus Richea endemic to Tasmania. It shares morphological similarities with other species in the genus, particularly Richea pandanifolia, but differs in leaf structure and floral arrangement.

== Description ==
Richea dracophylla is an erect, woody shrub that typically reaches heights of 1.5 to 5 meters. The plant is characterized by its sparse branching and clusters of leaves towards the ends of the branches. The leaves are spirally arranged, tapering to a sharp point, and measure between 15 and 30 centimetres in length. They possess sheathing basses that wrap around the steam, a common feature in the Richea genus.

The inflorescences consists of dense terminal clusters of over 300 small white slower, approximately 15–30 cm long. The flowers are enclosed in a fused calyptra, which must be removes by external agents before pollination can occur. Flowering occurs over an extended period, typically from June to April, providing an important nectar source throughout the year.

== Habitat and distribution ==
Richea dracophylla is endemic to Tasmania and occurs in a variety of habitats, including rainforest, wet sclerophyll forest, montane regions, and subalpine areas. It is particularly prevalent in the south-eastern part of the state, with notable population in Wellington Park, Tasman National Parks, as well as on Bruny and Maria Islands.

It grows in well-drained, acidic soils derived from dolerite and sandstone, in high rainfall areas with no prolonged drought periods. Richea dracophylla is a common component of cool temperate rainforest vegetation, particularly when found in association with species such as Nothofagus cunninghamii (myrtle beech) and Atherosperma moschatum (southern sassafras). In rainforests with nutrient-poor soils, Richea dracophylla can dominate, whereas in richer soils, Nothofagus cunninghamii is often the dominant species.

The largest specimens of Richea dracophylla occur in wet sclerophyll forests beneath a canopy of Eucalyptus species, where they can reach their maximum height. At higher elevations, Richea dracophylla may be reduced to a stunted shrub form, particularly in subalpine areas exposed to harsh environmental conditions.

== Ecological importance ==
Richea dracophylla plays a vital role in Tasmania's montane and subalpine ecosystems, contributing to floral diversity and providing structural habitat for invertebrates and small vertebrates. The species exhibits a complex pollination strategy, relying on multiple pollinators, including nectar-feeding birds, flying insects, and nocturnal ants. The long flowering season and diverse pollinator interactions enhance its reproductive success and resilience to environmental changes.

Notably, the nocturnal ant Notoncus hickmani has been observed visiting flowers at night during winter, making it one of the rare examples of nocturnal ant pollination. These ants collect nectar from exposed flowers and inadvertently transfer pollen, facilitating geitonogamy (pollination between adjacent flowers on the same plant). However, birds such as the New Holland honeyeater (Phylidonyris novaehollandiae) and yellow wattlebird (Anthochaera paradoxa) play a crucial role in removing the calyptra, enabling access for other pollinators.

== Threats and conservation ==
Although Richea dracophylla is not currently listed as a threatened species, several factors pose potential risks to its long-term survival. Habitat destruction due to land clearing, logging, and urban expansion threatens populations in lowland areas. Additionally, climate change is expected to impact its range, as rising temperatures and altered precipitation patterns could reduce the availability of suitable habitat.
