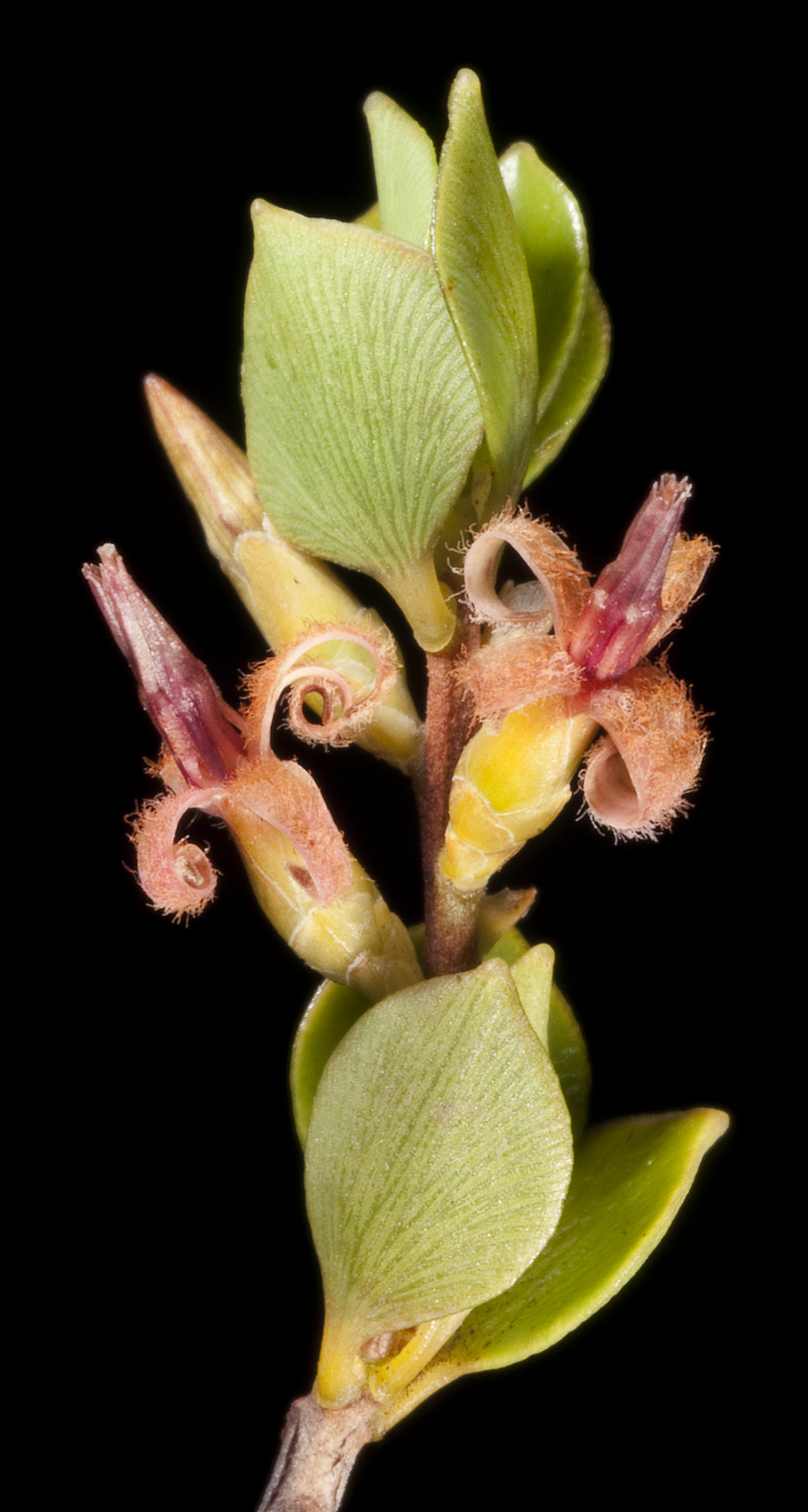

Scientific classification
- Kingdom: Plantae
- Clade: Tracheophytes
- Clade: Angiosperms
- Clade: Eudicots
- Clade: Asterids
- Order: Ericales
- Family: Ericaceae
- Genus: Styphelia
- Species: S. coelophylla

Binomial name
- Styphelia coelophylla (A.Cunn. ex DC.) Hislop, Crayn & Puente-Lel.

Synonyms
- Coleanthera coelophylla (A.Cunn. ex DC.) Benth.; Leucopogon coelophyllus A.Cunn. ex DC.; Coleanthera myrtoides Stschegl.; Coleanthera myrtoides var. uniflora Stschegl.; Michiea symphyanthera F.Muell.; Styphelia michiei F.Muell.

= Styphelia coelophylla =

Species of flowering plant

Styphelia coelophylla is a plant in the family Ericaceae endemic to the south west of Western Australia. It is an erect, bushy shrub with egg-shaped to lance-shaped leaves and tube-shaped flowers.

== Description ==
Styphelia coelophylla is an erect, bushy shrub that typically grows to a height of 30–60 cm (12–24 in) and usually has soft hairs on the branches, and parts of the leaves. The leaves are egg-shaped to lance-shaped, 6–12 mm (0.24–0.47 in) long, with a small hard point on the tip and strongly striated on the lower surface. The flowers are usually arranged singly in leaf axils on a very short peduncle with very small, broad bracts less than 1 mm (0.039 in) long. The sepals are about 1 mm (0.039 in) long, and the petals are joined at the base forming a tube that is shorter than the sepals, the lobes longer than the petal tube and bearded on the inside.

== Taxonomy ==
This species was first formally described in 1839 by Augustin Pyramus de Candolle who gave it the name Leucopogon coelophyllus in his Prodromus Systematis Naturalis Regni Vegetabilis, from an unpublished description by Allan Cunningham. In 2020, Michael Hislop, Darren Crayn and Caroline Puente-Lelievre based on phylogenetic studies, transferred the species to Styphelia as S. coelophylla.

== Distribution ==
Styphelia coelophylla found in the Avon Wheatbelt, Esperance Plains, Coolgardie, and Mallee Bioregions in the South-west of Western Australia.
