= Mingimingi =

Mingimingi is a Māori word meaning 'twisted' or similar. The name is used to describe at least three different species of New Zealand plants:

- Coprosma propinqua (Mingimingi), a widespread small leaved shrub.
- Leucopogon fasciculatus (Tall mingimingi), a forest shrub.
- Leptecophylla juniperina (Prickly mingimingi, formerly Cyathodes juniperina), a low spreading shrub.

The three species are not closely related and are quite different in appearance, but all three produce small edible berries with a similar sweet but somewhat bland flavour, and are among the more common New Zealand native shrubs with edible fruit.
