= Styphelia lanata =

Conservation status
- Declared Rare — Presumed Extinct (DEC)

Scientific classification
- Kingdom: Plantae
- Clade: Tracheophytes
- Clade: Angiosperms
- Clade: Eudicots
- Clade: Asterids
- Order: Ericales
- Family: Ericaceae
- Genus: Styphelia
- Species: S. lanata

Binomial name
- Styphelia lanata Hislop, Crayn & Puente-Lel.

Synonyms
- Coleanthera virgata Stschegl.

Species of plant

Styphelia lanata is a species of flowering plant in the heath family Ericaceae and is endemic to Western Australia. It is a shrub with wand-like branches, usually covered with loose, soft hairs, the leaves linear to lance-shaped about 12 mm (0.47 in) long, and white, tube-shaped flowers with small bracts and bracteoles. The lobes of the petal tube are bearded only at the base.

This species was first formally described in 1859 by Sergei Sergeyevich Sheglejev who gave it the name Coleanthera virgata in the Bulletin de la Société impériale des naturalistes de Moscou. In 2020, Michael Hislop, Darren Crayn and Caroline Puente-Lelievre transferred it to the genus Styphelia, but the name S. virgata was unavailable, as it was given to a species now known as Leucopogon virgatus (Labill.) R.Br. The name S. lanata was given to the new species.

This species of Styphelia is presumed extinct by the Government of Western Australia Department of Biodiversity, Conservation and Attractions.
