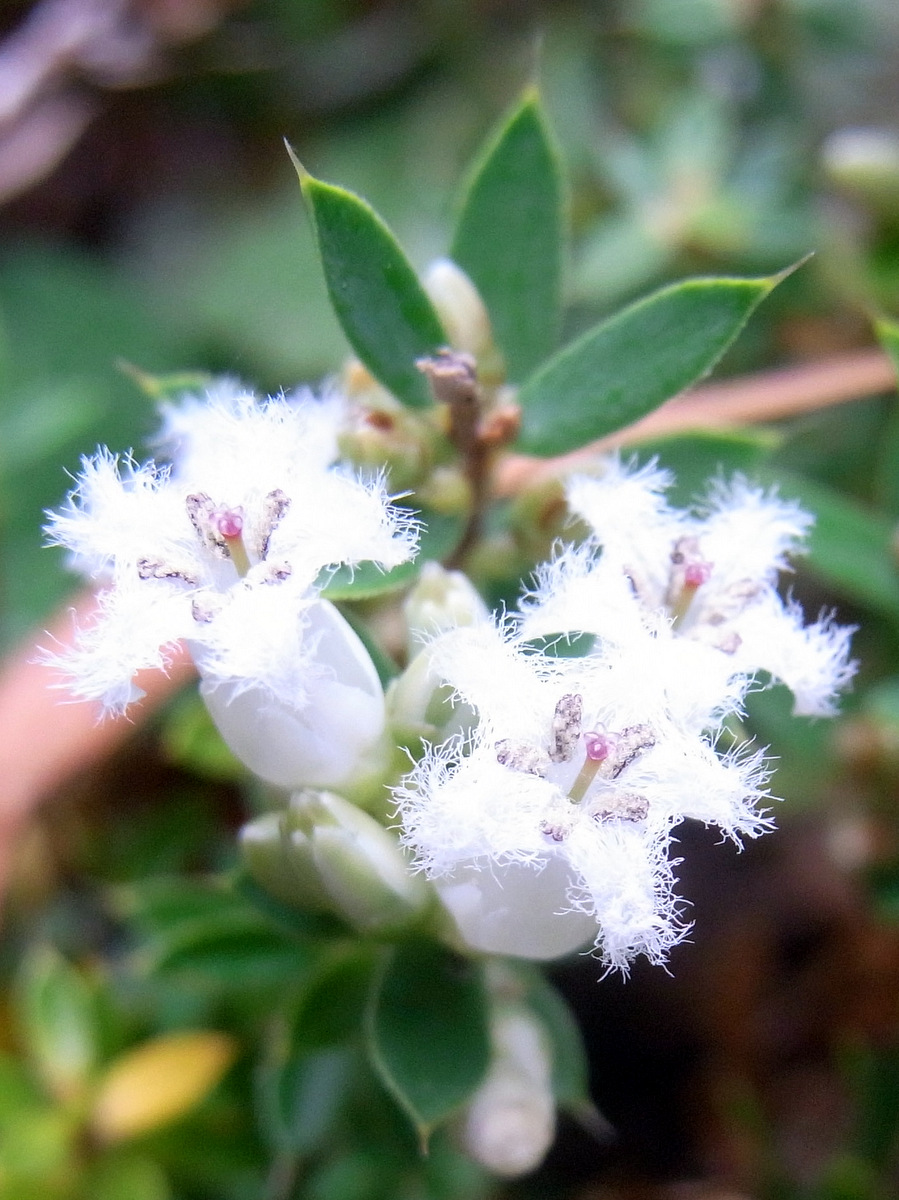

Scientific classification
- Kingdom: Plantae
- Clade: Tracheophytes
- Clade: Angiosperms
- Clade: Eudicots
- Clade: Asterids
- Order: Ericales
- Family: Ericaceae
- Genus: Pentachondra
- Species: P. pumila

Binomial name
- Pentachondra pumila (J.R.Forst. & G.Forst.) R.Br.

= Pentachondra pumila =

Species of flowering plant

Pentachondra pumila, also known as carpet heath, is a small alpine shrub in the epacris family (Ericaceae). It is commonly found in Australia and New Zealand in areas of high rainfall, being known for its small white flowers as well as its red, hollow fruit that grows on branch ends. It is distinguishable as a prostrate, mat-like shrub, growing in rocky or boggy alpine areas. The fruit is edible and is a food source for many species of bird.

== Description ==
P. pumila is a prostrate shrub, up to 10 cm in height and 40 cm in diameter. Branches are pubescent or occasionally glabrous. Leaves are crowded near ends of branches and are oblong to elliptical in shape, 3–5 mm long and 1–2 mm wide. Leaves are leathery and bluntly keeled with 5-7 veins on the lower surface, margins are ciliate. Flowering occurs from November through to February; small, white flowers are solitary on or near the ends of branches and sessile, usually facing upright. Flowers are hermaphrodite, with petals fused to form a tube 5 mm long. The upper side of petals is densely hairy, becoming sparser in the corolla tube. Five anthers are fused to the petals with a short style protruding from the centre, reaching 1.5 mm in height. Fruiting occurs from December through to April; fruit is green through winter months, becoming a fleshy red drupe upon ripening in the summer, and is separated into distinct pyrenes, with the style remaining after the death of the flower.

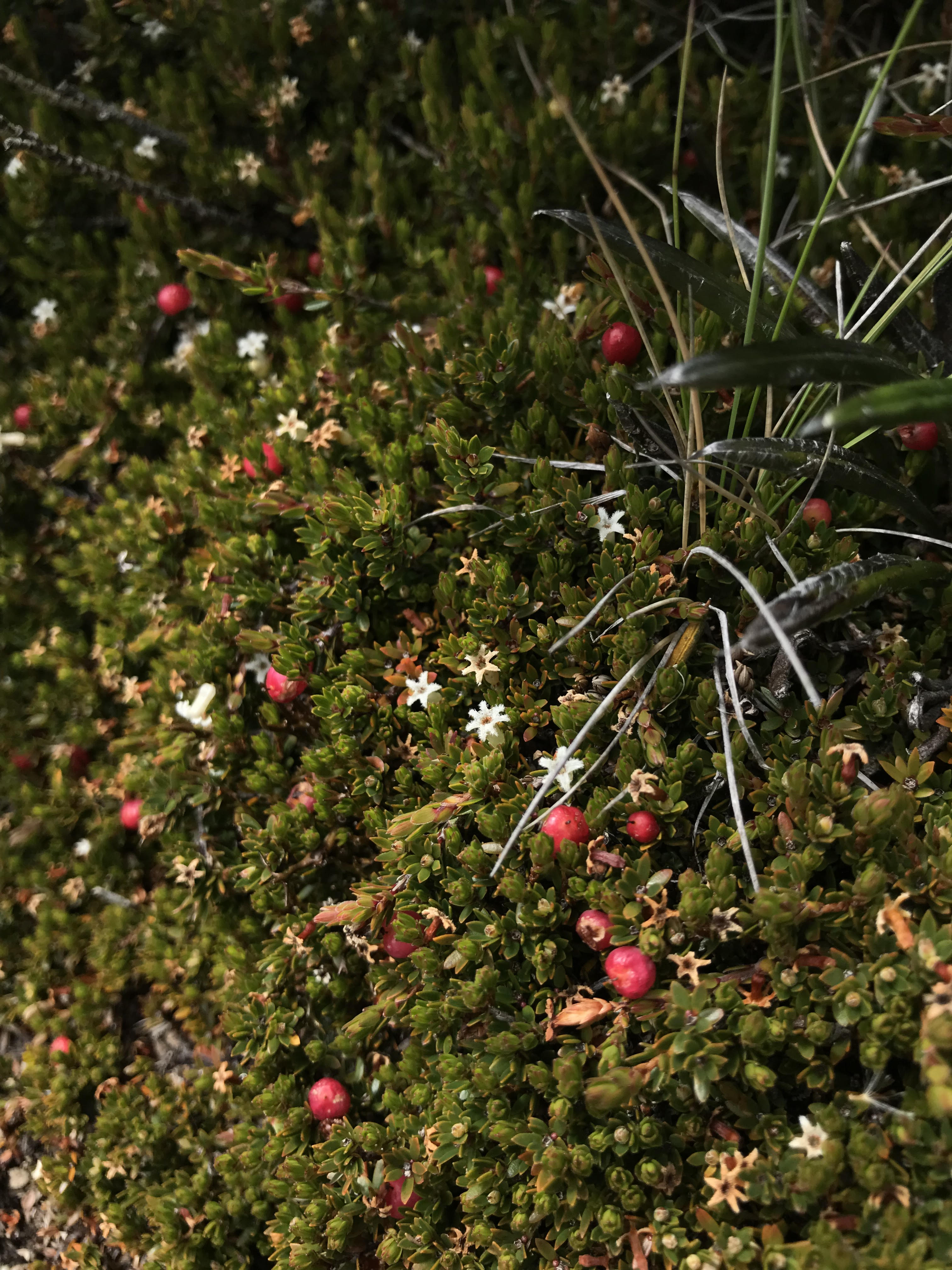
Image of Pentachondra pumila taken at Mount Field National Park, Tasmania depicting its mat-like appearance.

== Taxonomy ==
Scientific name: Pentachondra pumila (J.R.Forst. & G.Forst.) R.Br., Prodr. Fl. Nov. Holland. 549 (1810) Synonymy: ≡ Epacris pumila J.R.Forst. & G.Forst., Char. Gen. Pl., ed. 2. 20 (1776)

== Distribution ==
P. pumila occurs in areas above the treeline in cushion bogs, open snow tussock grasslands, and herbfields in Australia (Tasmania, Victoria, and New South Wales) and New Zealand (North, South, and Stewart Island). It is widely distributed through both countries in the aforementioned states, though less so in the North Island of New Zealand and New South Wales in Australia. It frequently grows in exposed, rocky sites or in poorly drained, peaty areas, and is commonly found on the nests of ants (genus Ochetellus). It is often confused with Cyathodes dealbata, which is similar in appearance and growth habit, though can be distinguished by the glaucus veins on the underside of leaves, which is not evident on P. pumila.

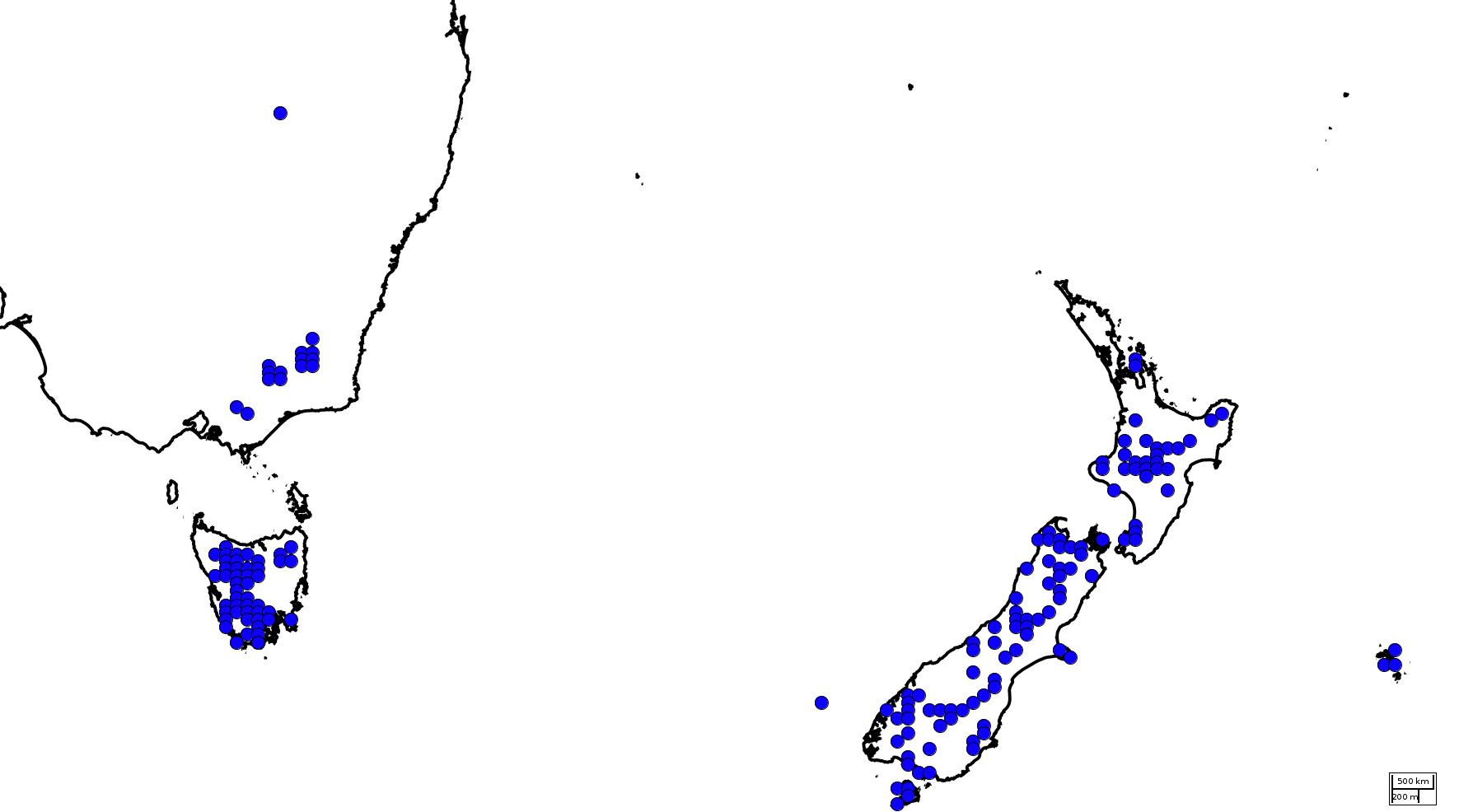
Distribution of Pentachondra pumila across Australia and New Zealand.

== Cultivation ==
P. pumila requires open, sunny positions in areas that are subject to mild winters (no less than -5 °C), and cool, moist summers. A high rainfall is required as it is intolerant to drought. It prefers a gritty, peaty soil and rocky ground for establishment.

== Ecology and reproduction ==
Self-pollination occurs in most flowers, with pollen falling into the corolla tube from the anthers. Despite the frequency of this occurring, this species of plant has a high degree of self-sterility to prevent intense inbreeding. Through self-pollination, it has been found that only a small number of fruits arise, and those that do, have a reduced number of seeds. In contrast to this, cross pollination has been found to induce high fruit numbers. Although hermaphrodites, the anthers, short stigma, sticky pollen, and nectar that resides in the bottom of the corolla tube suggest that insect pollination is the main means of cross pollination between flowers (both on the same plant and others in the surrounding area).
