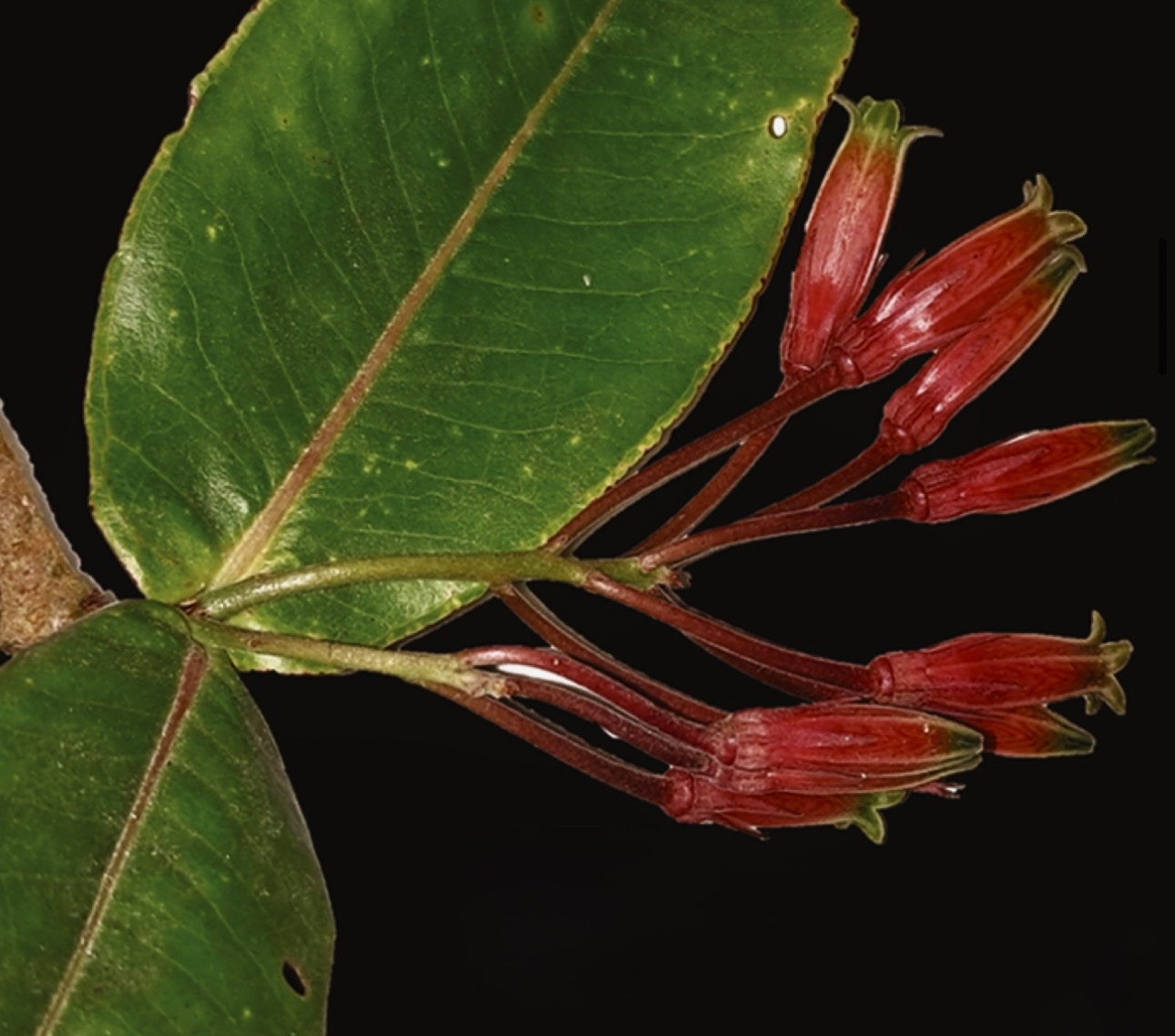

Scientific classification
- Kingdom: Plantae
- Clade: Tracheophytes
- Clade: Angiosperms
- Clade: Eudicots
- Clade: Asterids
- Order: Ericales
- Family: Ericaceae
- Genus: Agapetes
- Species: A. athangensis

Binomial name
- Agapetes athangensis P.Gyeltshen
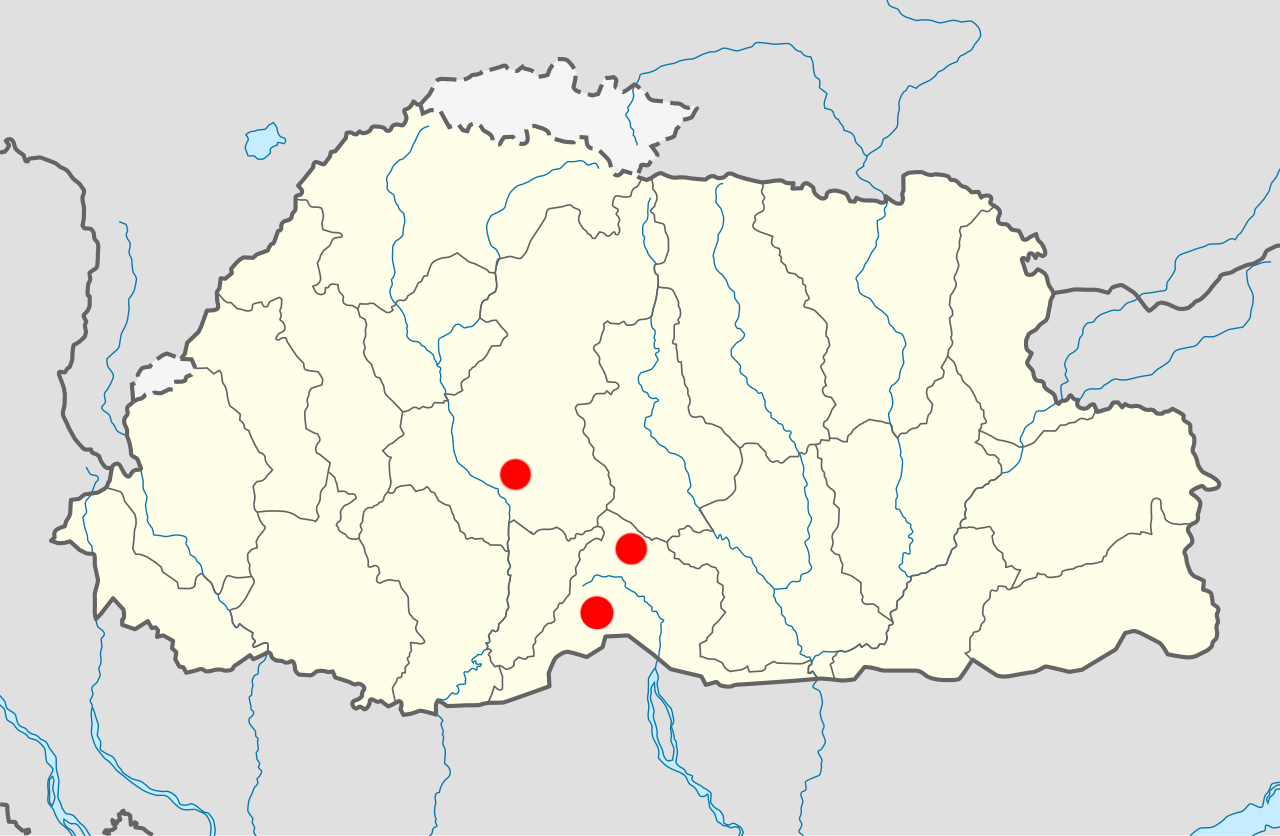

= Agapetes athangensis =

Species of flowering plant

Agapetes athangensis is a species of flowering plant in the family Ericaceae endemic to Bhutan.

== Description ==
Agapetes athangensis is a perennial epiphytic or terrestrial shrub that grows up to 3 meters tall. It has a basal irregular lignotuber. The stem is stout and the twigs are angular and glabrous. The leaves are sub opposite to pseudoverticillate and spaced 5 to 30 centimeters apart. When pseudoverticillate, the leaves occur in groups of two or three. The leaves are subsessile or have petioles 1 to 2 millimeters long. The lamina is ovate lanceolate to elliptic lanceolate and measures 12 to 34 centimeters long by 4.3 to 10 centimeters wide. The leaf base is cordate and the apex is acuminate. The margin is crenate or entire. There are 20 to 32 pairs of secondary veins and the midvein is raised on both surfaces. The venation is brochidodromous. The leaves are glabrous and lack basal glands.

The inflorescence is pseudoterminal, axillary, or cauliflorous. It is racemose or sub corymbose, 7 to 12 centimeters long, and bears 3 to 12 flowers. The peduncle is 1 to 3 centimeters long, pubescent, and green. The rachis is 3 to 15 millimeters long, semi erect or pendulous, and puberulous. The bracts on the rachis are minute, deltoid or subulate, and 1.8 to 4 millimeters long. The floral bracts at the base of the pedicel are small and triangular with a puberulous abaxial surface. The bracteoles are basal, deltoid, approximately 1 millimeter long, and puberulous abaxially. The pedicels are 2.5 to 4 centimeters long, cupulate at the apex, not striated, and puberulous. They are pale green at the base and reddish toward the apex.

The calyx is tubular, red to pinkish red, and 4 to 7 millimeters long with five angles. The calyx lobes are narrowly lanceolate, 8 to 11 millimeters long and 2 to 3 millimeters wide. They are distinctly separated by rounded sinuses at the base, thick, pubescent, and pale reddish orange with a greenish yellow apex. The corolla is tubular and red, becoming green at the apex and lobes. It is 1.8 to 2.3 centimeters long and approximately 6 millimeters in diameter. The outer surface is puberulous and angular. The corolla lobes are spreading, ovate, and measure 3.8 to 6 millimeters long by 2.7 to 3 millimeters wide. The apex is obtuse and the outer surface is puberulous.

There are 10 stamens measuring 2 to 2.2 centimeters in length. The filaments are flattened, oblong, and measure 3.7 to 4 millimeters long by 1.5 millimeters wide. They are incurved, puberulous, and white. The anthers are 1.9 to 2.1 centimeters long and spurred at the base. They are densely verrucose and sparsely puberulous abaxially, with denser pubescence at the junction of the anthers and filaments. The thecae are 5 to 7 millimeters long. The tubules are 10 to 14 millimeters long, sparsely verrucose proximally, and calcarate. The pistil is approximately 2.5 centimeters long. The ovary is inferior and pseudo 10 locular with a diameter of 4 to 5 millimeters. The style is filiform, 2.3 to 2.5 centimeters long, white, and glabrous. The stigma is capitate, 2.2 to 2.5 millimeters in diameter, five lobed, and pale green. The fruit is unknown.

== Taxonomy ==
Agapetes athangensis is assigned to Agapetes sect. Agapetes ser. Agapetes. This series is characterized by sub opposite to pseudowhorled and coriaceous leaves, entire or crenate margins, a calyx articulated at the base with the pedicel, free filaments, and a five lobed glandular capitate stigma.

The species is morphologically similar to Agapetes auriculata. It differs in having a puberulous inflorescence rather than a glabrous one. The calyx lobes are 8 to 11 millimeters long compared to 3 to 7.5 millimeters long in A. auriculata. The corolla is tubular rather than tubular urceolate and constricted toward the apex. The stamens are calcarate rather than ecalcarate. The style is 23 to 25 millimeters long compared to 10 to 18 millimeters long.

The species also resembles Agapetes sikkimensis. It differs by its inflorescence, which is racemose or sub corymbose rather than fascicled or short corymbose. The peduncle is 10 to 30 millimeters long compared to approximately 5 millimeters long. The corolla is tubular rather than tubular urceolate. The stamens are calcarate rather than ecalcarate. The style is 23 to 25 millimeters long compared to 10 to 22 millimeters long.

== Etymology ==
The specific epithet athangensis refers to the type locality, Athang Block in Wangdue Phodrang District, Bhutan.

== Distribution and habitat ==
Agapetes athangensis is endemic to Bhutan. It is known from two localities: the Ada area under Athang Block in Wangdue Phodrang District, and the Ranibagan and Retey areas under Dekiling and Jigmecholing Blocks in Sarpang District. The species grows as an epiphyte on Schima wallichii in warm broad leaved forest at elevations of 1000 to 1590 meters. Other associated tree species include Castanopsis tribuloides and Quercus griffithii. The species flowers from November to January.

== Conservation status ==
The species is known from three locations with five mature individuals recorded. All three habitats are situated along footpaths and roads and may be threatened by human activities and road expansion. No additional populations have been found in adjacent areas. Due to insufficient information on the species' abundance and distribution, it is assessed as Data Deficient (DD) according to IUCN Red List Categories and Criteria. Further surveys are needed to determine its full distribution and conservation status.
