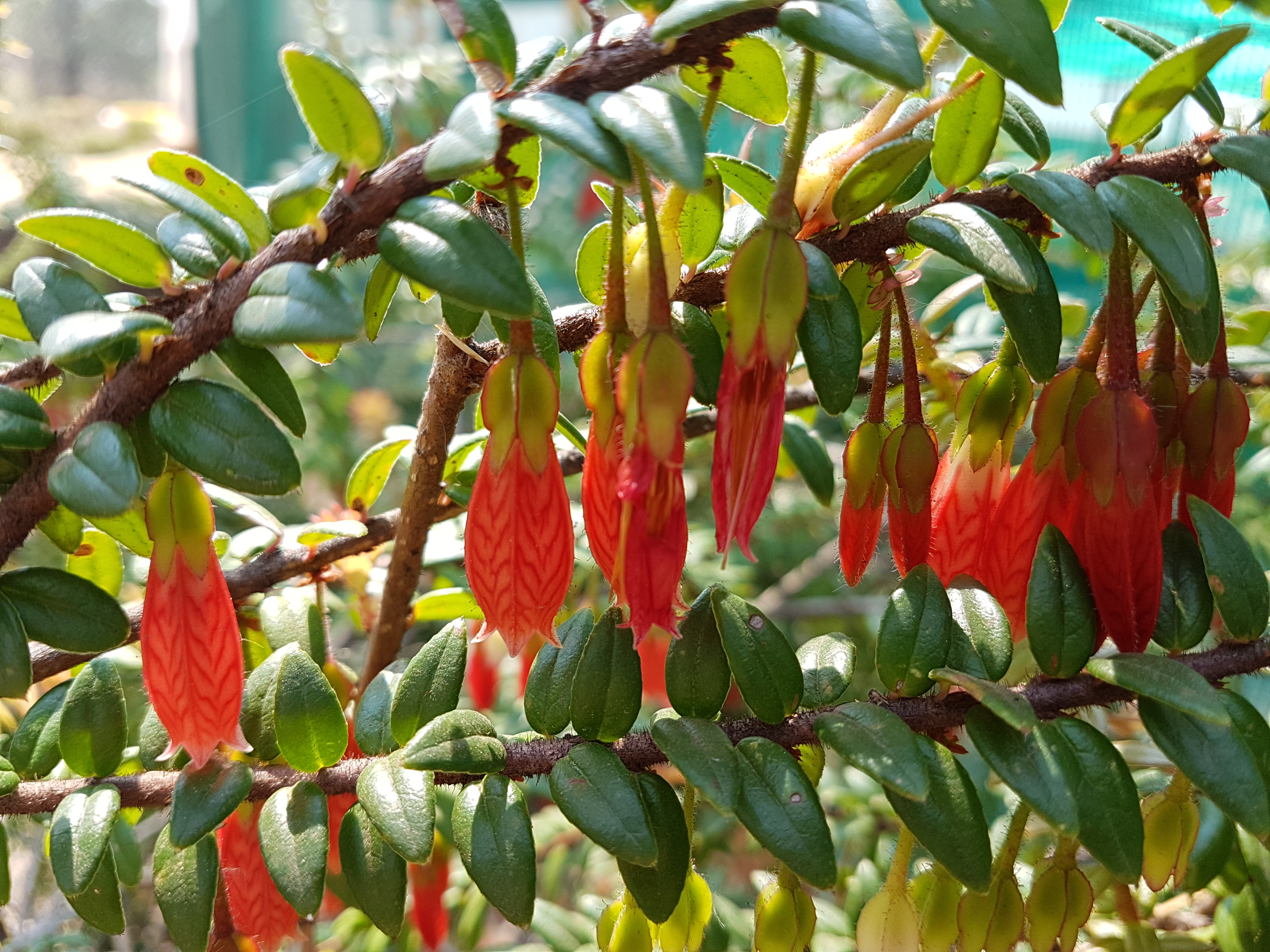
- Agapetes serpens

Scientific classification
- Kingdom: Plantae
- Clade: Embryophytes
- Clade: Tracheophytes
- Clade: Angiosperms
- Clade: Eudicots
- Clade: Asterids
- Order: Ericales
- Family: Ericaceae
- Subfamily: Vaccinioideae
- Tribe: Vaccinieae
- Genus: Agapetes; G.Don

Type species
- Agapetes setigera D.Don ex G.Don

= Agapetes =

Genus of flowering plants

Agapetes (Gk. ἀγαπητός (agapetos) = 'beloved') is a semi-climbing shrub genus native to the Himalayas, grown as an ornamental for its attractive pendulous bunches of red tubular flowers blooming over a long period. It is mostly grown in climates from cool temperate to sub-tropical. Propagation is from cuttings. As of 2018, The Plant List listed 245 species names published in Agapetes, of which 147 were accepted.

== Taxonomy ==
It was validly published by George Don in 1834 based on previous work by David Don. The lectotype species Agapetes setigera D. Don ex G. Don was designated in 1871.

=== Species ===
Species as of 2020 from eflora China and Plants of the world

Image	Name	Distribution
	Agapetes aborensis	China ( Xizang)
	Agapetes acuminata	Assam (Meghalaya) to Myanmar.
	Agapetes adenobotrys	N. Myanmar.
	Agapetes affinis	E. Himalaya to N. Myanmar.
	Agapetes angulata	China (Yunnan), India, Myanmar
	Agapetes angustifolia	Myanmar
	Agapetes anonyma	China (Xizang)
	Agapetes arunachalensis	Arunachal Pradesh.
	Agapetes athangensis	Bhutan
	Agapetes atrosanguinea	Arunachal Pradesh.
	Agapetes auriculata	E. Himalaya to N. Myanmar.
	Agapetes bhareliana	Arunachal Pradesh to N. Myanmar.
	Agapetes bhutanica	S. Bhutan to Darjiling.
	Agapetes borii	Assam (Manipur, Nagaland).
	Agapetes brachypoda	China (Yunnan)
	Agapetes bracteata	Myanmar, SE. Thailand, Vietnam.
	Agapetes brandisiana	China (Yunnan), Myanmar
	Agapetes brevipedicellata	Myanmar.
	Agapetes burmanica	China (Xizang, Yunnan), Myanmar
	Agapetes buxifolia	China (Xizang), India
	Agapetes camelliifolia	China (Xizang)
	Agapetes campanulata	Assam to Myanmar.
	Agapetes cauliflora	Vietnam.
	Agapetes chapaensis	Vietnam.
	Agapetes ciliata	China (Xizang)
	Agapetes dalaiensis	Arunachal Pradesh.
	Agapetes discolor	China (Xizang), India
	Agapetes dispar	Bangladesh to Myanmar.
	Agapetes epacridea	China (Xizang), Myanmar
	Agapetes fasciculiflora	Myanmar.
	Agapetes flava	China (Xizang), India
	Agapetes forrestii	China (Xizang, Yunnan), Myanmar
	Agapetes graciliflora	China (Xizang), Myanmar
	Agapetes griffithii	China (Xizang), India
	Agapetes guangxiensis	China (Guangxi)
	Agapetes haemantha	Myanmar.
	Agapetes hillii	Arunachal Pradesh to N. Myanmar.
	Agapetes hookeri	Nepal to Bhutan.
	Agapetes hosseana	S. Myanmar to Laos.
	Agapetes huangiana	China (Mêdog, Tibet)
	Agapetes hyalocheilos	China (Xizang), Myanmar
	Agapetes incurvata	China (SE Xizang), Bhutan, Bangladesh, India, Sikkim, Nepal
	Agapetes inopinata	China (Yunnan), Myanmar
	Agapetes interdicta	China (Xizang, Yunnan), Myanmar
	Agapetes kanjilali	Assam (Lakhimpur).
	Agapetes kingdonis	Arunachal Pradesh to Myanmar.
	Agapetes lacei	China (Xizang, Yunnan), Myanmar
	Agapetes leiocarpa	China (Xizang)
	Agapetes leucocarpa	Arunachal Pradesh to China (Xizang)
	Agapetes lihengiana	China (Yunnan)
	Agapetes linearifolia	China (Xizang)
	Agapetes listeri	China (Xizang), Bhutan, India
	Agapetes lobbii	China (Yunnan), India, Myanmar, Thailand
	Agapetes loranthiflora	Bangladesh to Thailand.
	Agapetes macrantha	Assam to Myanmar.
	Agapetes macrophylla	China (SE Xizang), Bangladesh
	Agapetes macrostemon	Myanmar to N. Thailand.
	Agapetes malipoensis	China (Yunnan), Vietnam
	Agapetes mannii	China (Yunnan), Myanmar, Thailand
	Agapetes marginata	China (Xizang)
	Agapetes medogensis	China (Xizang)
	Agapetes megacarpa	China (Yunnan), Thailand
	Agapetes miniata	China (Xizang), India
	Agapetes miranda	China (Xizang), India
	Agapetes mitrarioides	China (Xizang)
	Agapetes mondangensis	China (Yunnan).
	Agapetes moorei	Myanmar to Thailand.
	Agapetes nana	Assam (Nagaland) to N. Myanmar.
	Agapetes neriifolia	China (Yunnan), Myanmar
	Agapetes nutans	China (Xizang), India
	Agapetes nuttallii	Bhutan to Arunachal Pradesh
	Agapetes oblonga	China (Xizang, Yunnan), Myanmar
	Agapetes obovata	China (Yunnan), India
	Agapetes odontocera	India
	Agapetes oxycoccoides	Myanmar
	Agapetes pachyacme	Myanmar
	Agapetes parishii	Assam (Nagaland) to Thailand
	Agapetes pensilis	China (Yunnan), Myanmar
	Agapetes pentastigma	Myanmar
	Agapetes pilifera	China (Xizang, Yunnan), Myanmar, India
	Agapetes polyantha	Peninsular Malaysia.
	Agapetes pottingeri	N. Myanmar.
	Agapetes praeclara	China (Xizang)
	Agapetes praestigiosa	China (Xizang), India
	Agapetes pseudogriffithii	China (Yunnan), Myanmar
	Agapetes pubiflora	China (Xizang, Yunnan), Myanmar
	Agapetes putaoensis	Myanmar.
	Agapetes pyrolifolia	China (Xizang, Yunnan, Myanmar)
	Agapetes refracta	China (Xizang)
	Agapetes rubrobracteata	China (Guangxi, Guizhou, Sichuan, Yunnan), Vietnam
	Agapetes rubropedicellata	Myanmar.
	Agapetes salicifolia	China (SE Xizang), E. Arunachal Pradesh, Assam (Jaintia Hills).
	Agapetes saligna	Nepal to Myanmar.
	Agapetes saxicola	N. Thailand.
	Agapetes scortechinii	Assam, Peninsular Malaysia (Pahang).
	Agapetes serpens	China (Xizang), Bhutan, Nepal, India
	Agapetes setigera	Assam (Meghalaya) to Myanmar.
	Agapetes siangensis	Arunachal Pradesh.
	Agapetes sikkimensis	Nepal to Bhutan.
	Agapetes smithiana	Nepal to Bhutan.
	Agapetes spissa	China (SE Xizang)
	Agapetes spissiformis	Myanmar.
	Agapetes subansirica	Arunachal Pradesh.
	Agapetes subsessilifolia	China (Xizang)
	Agapetes subvinacea	Arunachal Pradesh to N. Myanmar.
	Agapetes thailandica	NW. Thailand.
	Agapetes toppinii	Myanmar.
	Agapetes trianguli	Myanmar.
	Agapetes variegata	Arunachal Pradesh to Bangladesh.
	Agapetes velutina	Vietnam.
	Agapetes vernayana	Myanmar.
	Agapetes wardii	Myanmar.
	Agapetes xiana	China (Xizang)
	Agapetes yingjiangensis	China (Yunnan)

== Use ==
=== Horticulture ===
In the UK, the cultivar Agapetes 'Ludgvan Cross' has gained the Royal Horticultural Society's Award of Garden Merit.
