= Pseudomeges marmoratus =

Scientific classification
- Kingdom: Animalia
- Phylum: Arthropoda
- Class: Insecta
- Order: Coleoptera
- Suborder: Polyphaga
- Infraorder: Cucujiformia
- Family: Cerambycidae
- Genus: Pseudomeges
- Species: P. marmoratus

Binomial name
- Pseudomeges marmoratus (Westwood, 1848)

Synonyms
- Hammaticherus marmoratus Westwood, 1848; Meges marmoratus (Westwood, 1848)

Species of beetle

Pseudomeges marmoratus is a species of beetle in the family Cerambycidae. It was described by John O. Westwood in 1848, originally under the genus Hammaticherus. It is known from India, Bhutan, and Myanmar. It feeds on Quercus griffithii.
