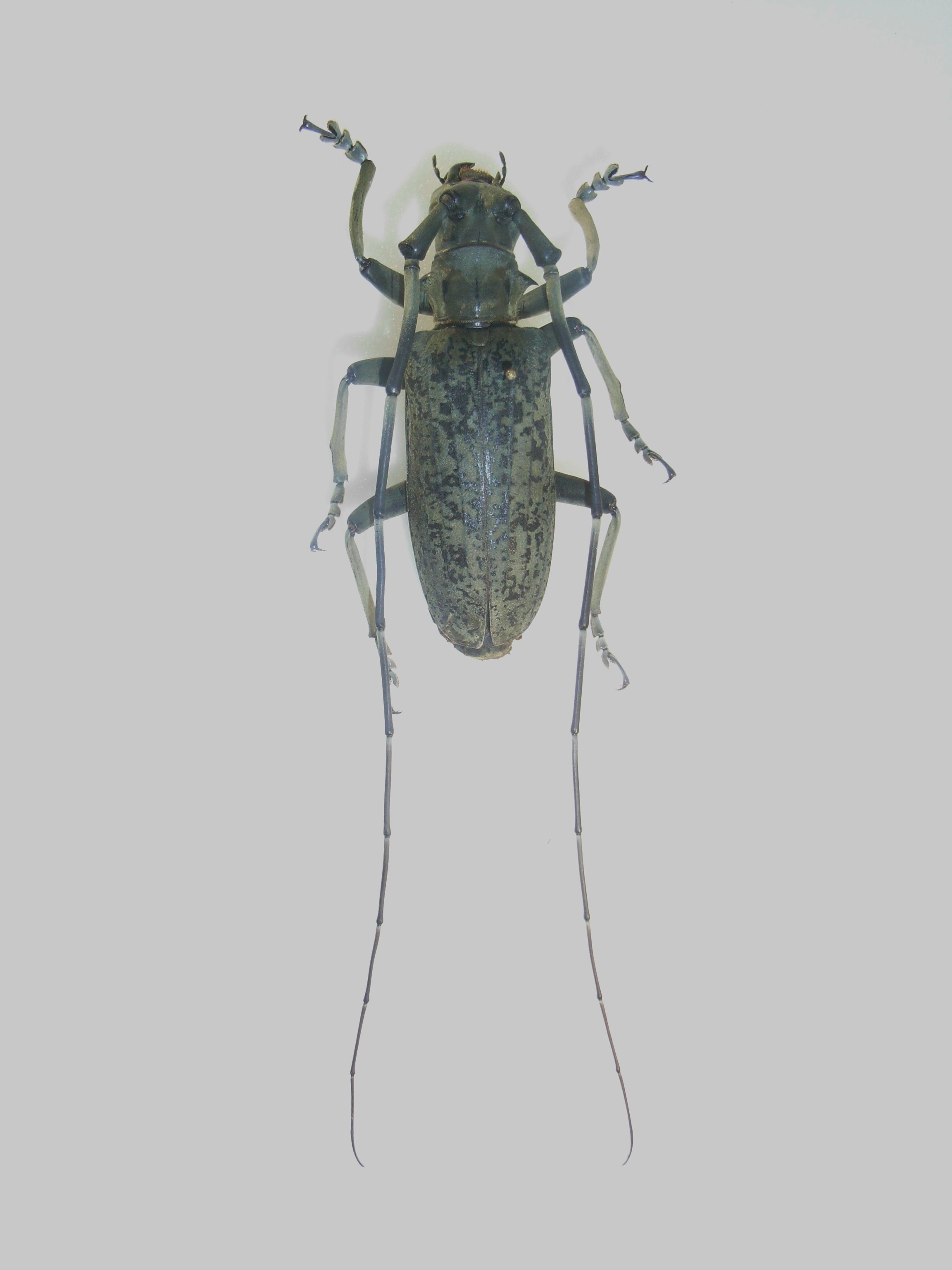

Scientific classification
- Kingdom: Animalia
- Phylum: Arthropoda
- Class: Insecta
- Order: Coleoptera
- Suborder: Polyphaga
- Infraorder: Cucujiformia
- Family: Cerambycidae
- Tribe: Lamiini
- Genus: Pseudomeges

= Pseudomeges =

Genus of beetles

Pseudomeges is a genus of longhorn beetles of the subfamily Lamiinae, containing the following species:

- Pseudomeges marmoratus (Westwood, 1848)
- Pseudomeges varioti Le Moult, 1946
