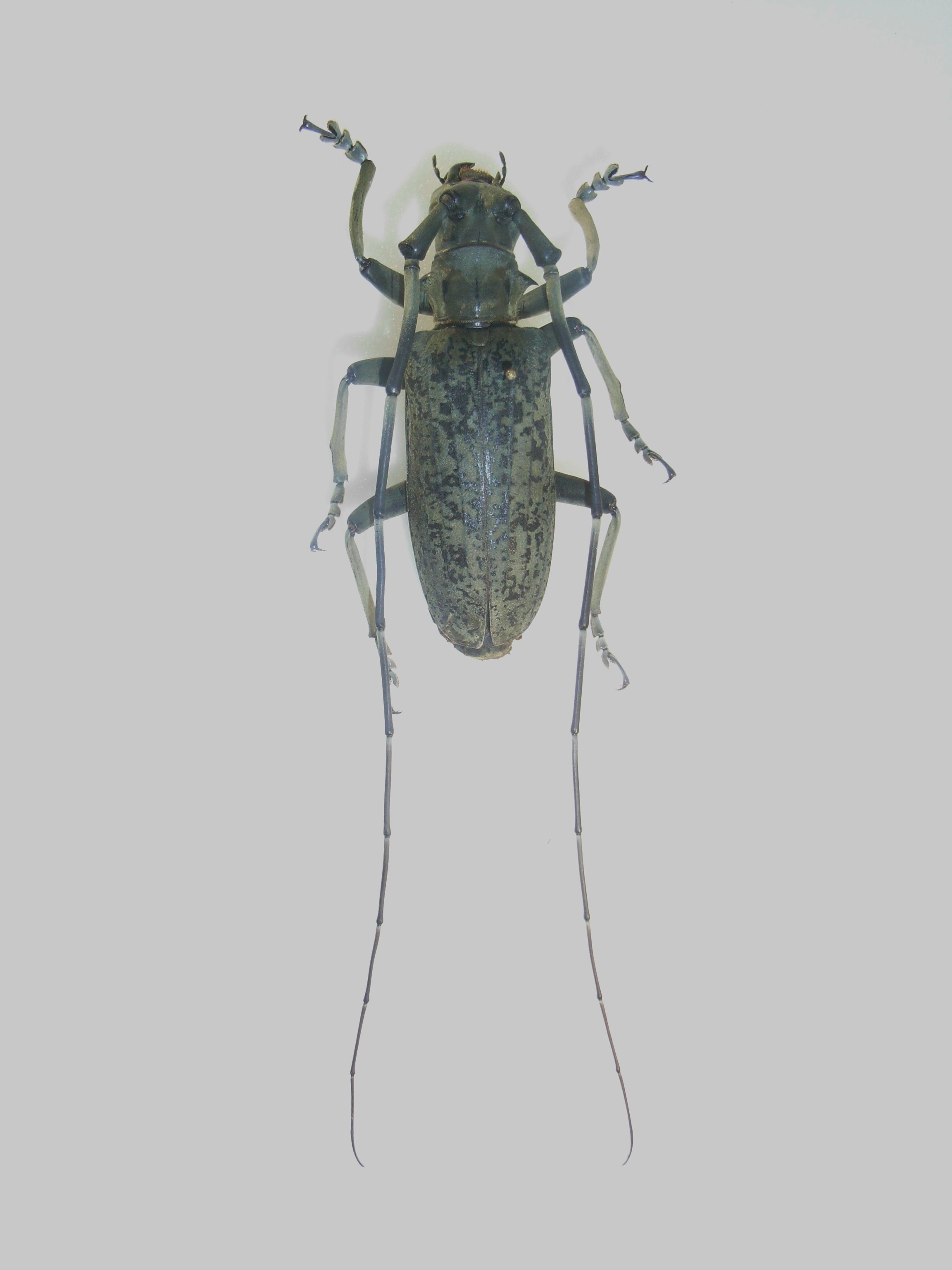

Scientific classification
- Kingdom: Animalia
- Phylum: Arthropoda
- Class: Insecta
- Order: Coleoptera
- Suborder: Polyphaga
- Infraorder: Cucujiformia
- Family: Cerambycidae
- Genus: Pseudomeges
- Species: P. varioti

Binomial name
- Pseudomeges varioti Le Moult, 1946

Synonyms
- Pseudomeges gigas Lepesme, 1947; Pseudomeges marmoratus (Westwood, 1848)

= Pseudomeges varioti =

Species of beetle

Pseudomeges varioti is a species of beetle in the family Cerambycidae. It was described by Eugène Le Moult in 1946. It is known from Thailand, Laos and Vietnam.
