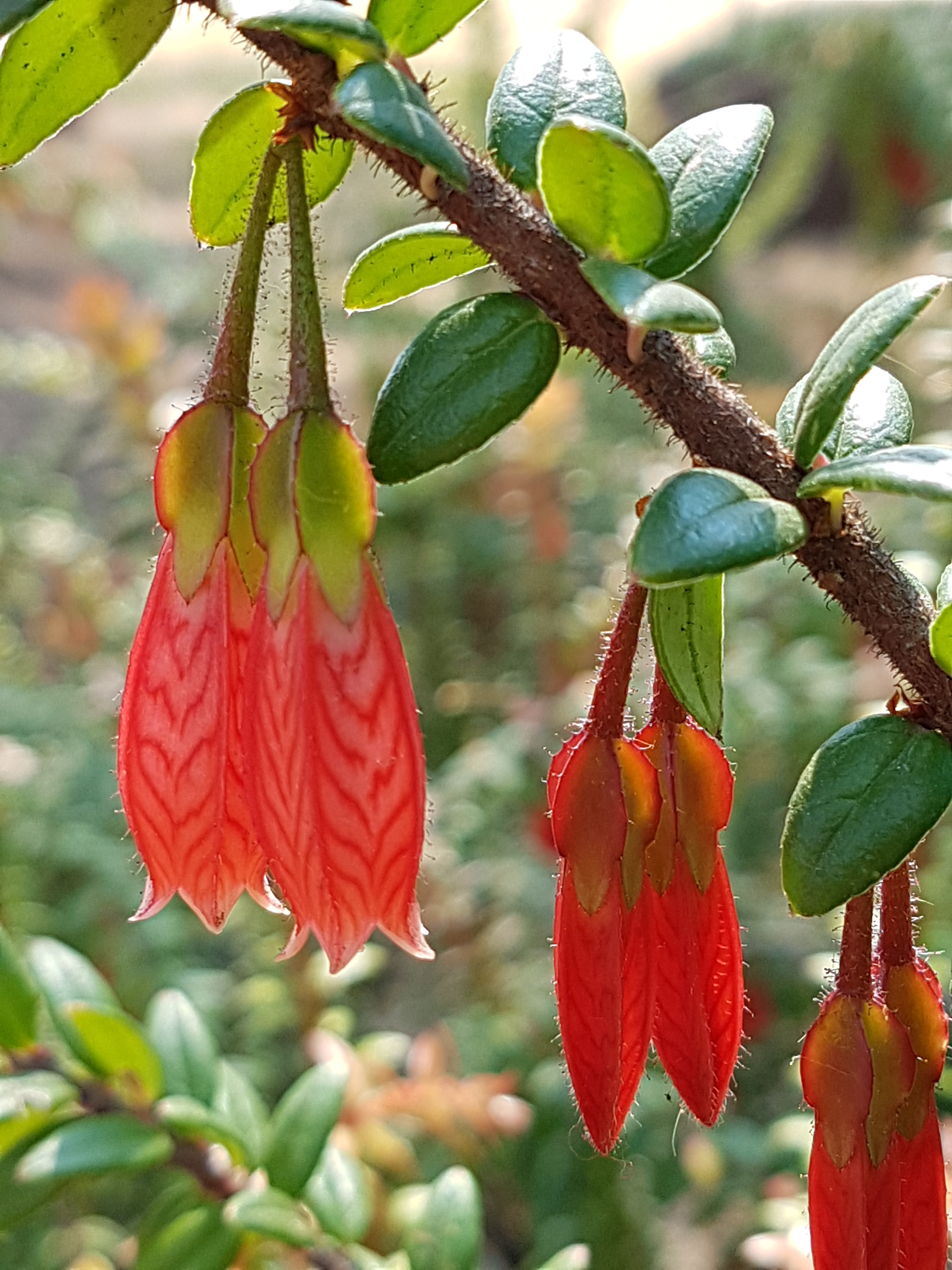

Scientific classification
- Kingdom: Plantae
- Clade: Embryophytes
- Clade: Tracheophytes
- Clade: Angiosperms
- Clade: Eudicots
- Clade: Asterids
- Order: Ericales
- Family: Ericaceae
- Genus: Agapetes
- Species: A. serpens

Binomial name
- Agapetes serpens (Wight) Sleumer

Synonyms
- Pentapterygium serpens (Wight) Klotzsch; Vaccinium serpens Wight

= Agapetes serpens =

Species of flowering plant

Agapetes serpens is a species of flowering plant in the heath family Ericaceae, that is native to the Himalayas. Growing to 40–60 cm (16–24 in) tall, this semi-climbing shrub is cultivated as an ornamental for its shiny evergreen leaves and branches of attractive pendulous tubular red flowers, blooming over a long period. It is grown in climates from warm temperate to sub-tropical, but does not survive prolonged freezing (RHS hardiness rating H2). It requires a sheltered position in acid or neutral soil.

The Latin specific epithet serpens means "creeping".

This plant has received the Royal Horticultural Society's Award of Garden Merit.

== Taxonomy ==
It was first described in 1847 as Vaccinium serpens by Robert Wight. In 1851 Johann Klotzch redescribed it as Pentapterygium serpens (a name which is not accepted). In 1939 Hermann Sleumer transferred it to the genus, Agapetes, to give the species its currently accepted name of Agapetes serpens.
