= Vaccinium piliferum =

Conservation status
- Endangered (IUCN 3.1)

Scientific classification
- Kingdom: Plantae
- Clade: Embryophytes
- Clade: Tracheophytes
- Clade: Spermatophytes
- Clade: Angiosperms
- Clade: Eudicots
- Clade: Asterids
- Order: Ericales
- Family: Ericaceae
- Genus: Vaccinium
- Species: V. piliferum

Binomial name
- Vaccinium piliferum (Hook.f. ex C.B.Clarke) Sleumer

Synonyms
- Agapetes pilifera Hook.fil.; Agapetes pilifera Hook.fil. ex C.B.Clarke

Species of flowering plant

Vaccinium piliferum is a species of blueberry in the heath family, Ericaceae. The plant is endemic to the Eastern Himalayas and was originally described in the 19th century.

== Description ==
The species is known for its small blue fruits and montane forest habitat. In 2025, it was rediscovered in Arunachal Pradesh, India, after not being recorded for about 188 years.
