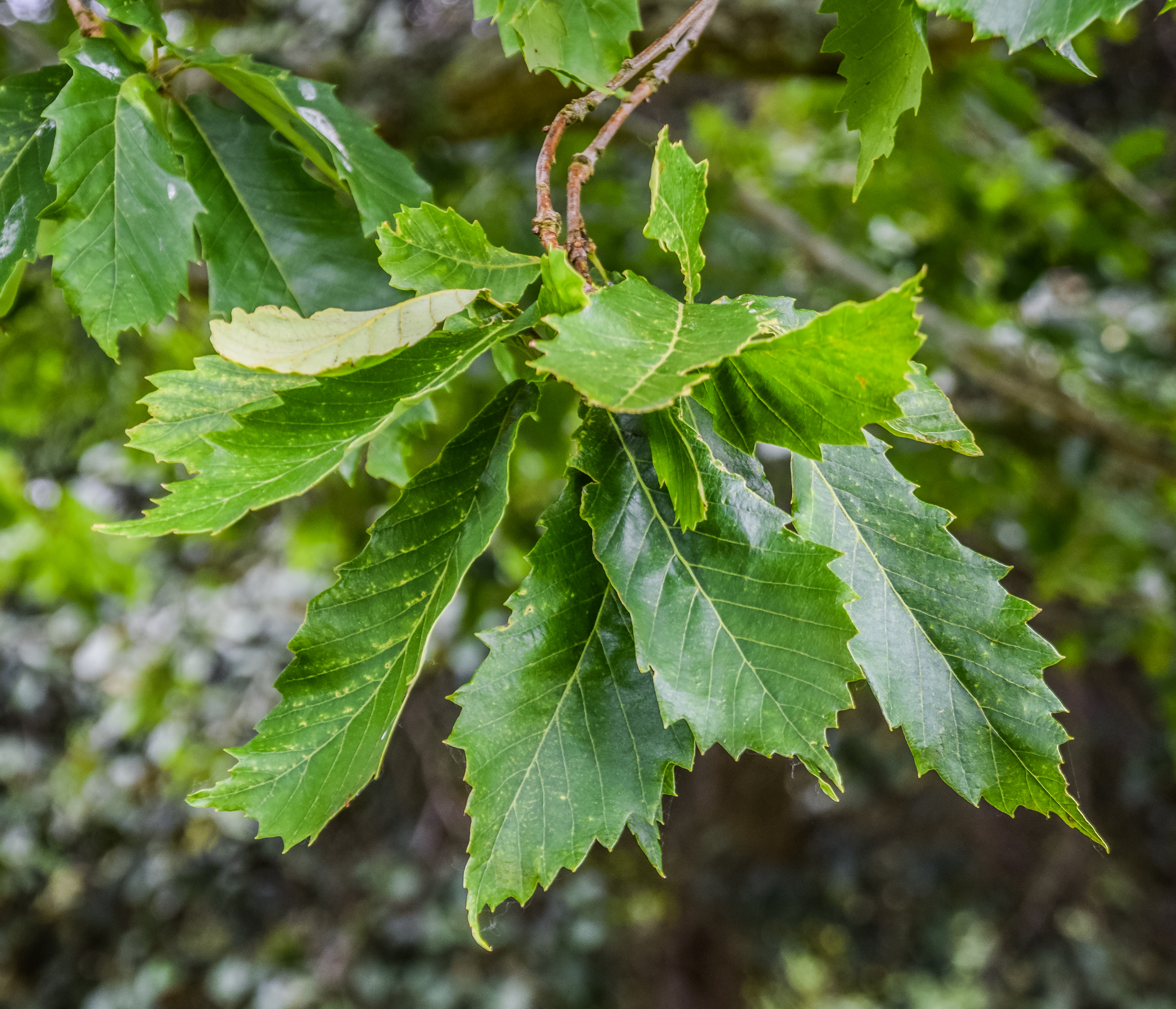
- Quercus griffithii in Hackfalls Arboretum

Conservation status
- Least Concern (IUCN 3.1)

Scientific classification
- Kingdom: Plantae
- Clade: Embryophytes
- Clade: Tracheophytes
- Clade: Spermatophytes
- Clade: Angiosperms
- Clade: Eudicots
- Clade: Rosids
- Order: Fagales
- Family: Fagaceae
- Genus: Quercus
- Subgenus: Quercus subg. Quercus
- Section: Quercus sect. Quercus
- Species: Q. griffithii

Binomial name
- Quercus griffithii Hook.f. & Thomson ex Miq.

Synonyms
- Quercus aliena subsp. griffithii (Hook.f. & Thomson ex Miq.) Phengklai; Quercus aliena var. griffithii (Hook.f. & Thomson ex Miq.) Schottky

= Quercus griffithii =

Species of flowering plant

Quercus griffithii, called paisang, is a species of oak native to the eastern Himalayas, Tibet, south-central and southeast China, Assam, Myanmar, Thailand, Laos, and Vietnam. It is in the subgenus Quercus, section Quercus. Some authorities feel that it could be a synonym of Quercus aliena var. acutiserrata. It is a deciduous tree reaching 25 metres (82 feet) with an oblong crown, typically found from 700 to 2,800 m (2,300 to 9,200 ft) above sea level. It is a locally important fuelwood and fodder species.
