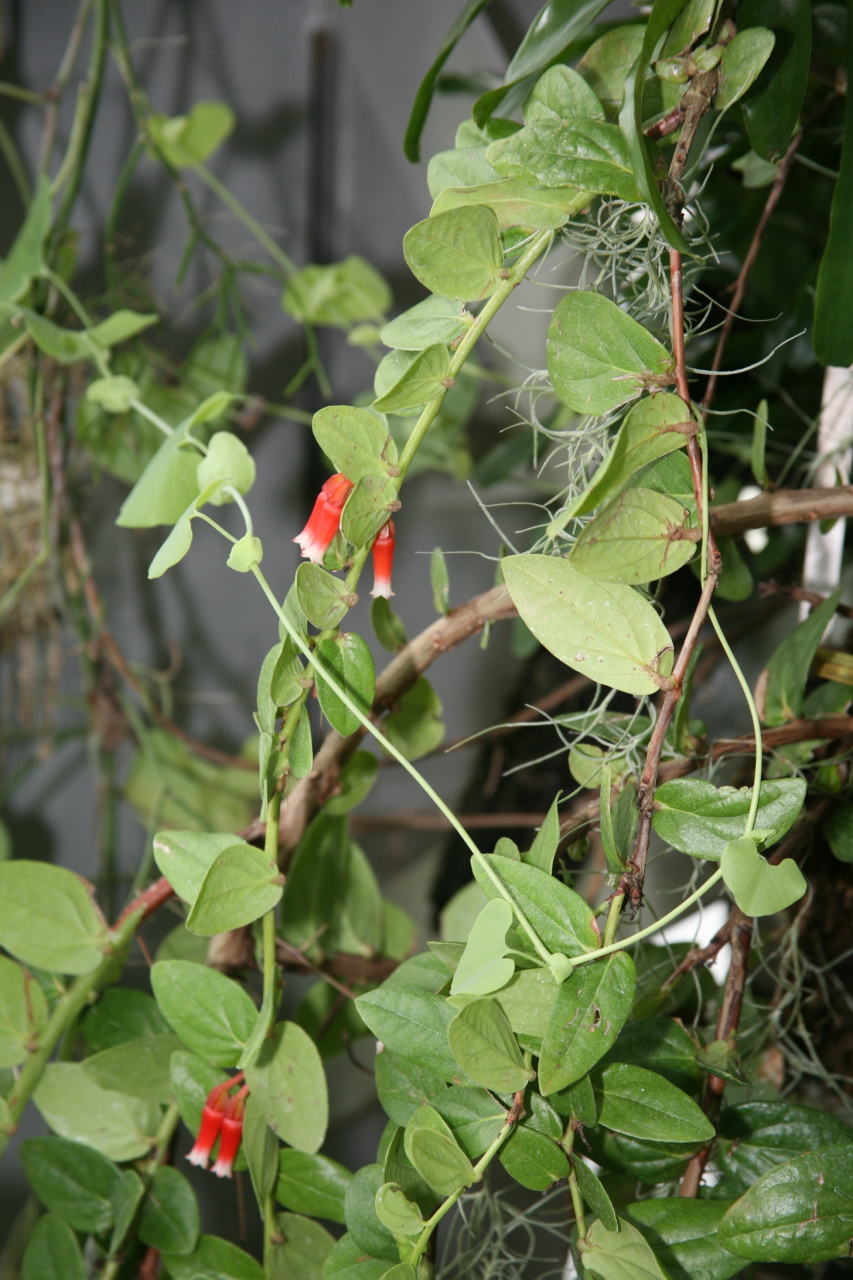
- Macleania insignis, US Botanic Garden, Washington, DC

Scientific classification
- Kingdom: Plantae
- Clade: Tracheophytes
- Clade: Angiosperms
- Clade: Eudicots
- Clade: Asterids
- Order: Ericales
- Family: Ericaceae
- Subfamily: Vaccinioideae
- Tribe: Vaccinieae
- Genus: Macleania; Hook.

Type species
- Macleania floribunda Hook. 1837

= Macleania =

Genus of flowering plants

Macleania is a genus of plants in the family Ericaceae.

== Description ==
They are epiphytic or terrestrial shrubs. Alternate leaves, petiolate, coriaceous, pinnatinervias or plinervias. Subfasciculate or racemose inflorescences, axillary or terminal, with few to numerous flowers, bibracteolate pedicels, deciduous bracteoles; hypanthium articulated with the pedicel, cylindrical or campanulate; calyx limb erect and patent, (3–) 5-lobed, lobes subacute and triangular; corolla subcylindrical or elongated urceolate, 5-parted, triangular lobes, acute to subacute; stamens usually 10, equal, usually about half as long as corolla, filaments free or connate, anthers strong with strongly granular thecae, tubules nearly as long as anther sacs, or laterally connate or fused to form a tubule simple, rarely completely free, opening by elongated free or fused slits, introrse; style threadlike and about the same length as the corolla or longer, ovary 5-locular. The fruit is a berry with numerous small seeds.

== Taxonomy ==
The genus was described by William Jackson Hooker and published in Icones Plantarum 2:t. 109. 1837, based on a specimen brought from Peru. Johann Friedrich Klotzsch identified ten species in 1851. Later Hooker separated Psammisia from Macleania. Oscar Drude (1891) and William Wright Smith (1942), as well as other botanists, pointed out the remarkable nature of this genus and its relationship with Psammisia. Macleania was named for John Maclean (1786-1857), a Scottish merchant who exported plants from Lima, Peru.

Species include:

Image	Name	Distribution
	Macleania alata	Ecuador.
	Macleania amplexicaulis	Colombia (Cauca)
	Macleania angulata	Peru.
	Macleania antioquiae	Colombia.
	Macleania benthamiana	Ecuador to Peru.
	Macleania bullata	Colombia to Ecuador.
	Macleania coccoloboides	Ecuador.
	Macleania cordifolia	Ecuador to Peru.
	Macleania costeroides	Ecuador (Napo)
	Macleania crassa	Colombia (Cauca, Valle del Cauca. )
	Macleania dodsonii	Ecuador.
	Macleania epiphytica	Panama.
	Macleania ericae	Ecuador.
	Macleania farinosa	Peru.
	Macleania floribunda	Peru.
	Macleania hirtiflora	Ecuador, NW. Venezuela
	Macleania insignis	S. Mexico to Central America
	Macleania loeseneriana	Ecuador.
	Macleania macrantha	Colombia to N. Peru.
	Macleania maldonadensis	Ecuador.
	Macleania mollis	Ecuador.
	Macleania penduliflora	Colombia (Antioquia).
	Macleania pentaptera	Ecuador.
	Macleania poortmannii	Ecuador.
	Macleania pubiflora	Colombia (Boyacá, Cauca, Nariño.)
	Macleania recumbens	Ecuador.
	Macleania robusta	Colombia (Magdalena. )
	Macleania rotundifolia	Ecuador.
	Macleania rupestris	Nicaragua to Venezuela and Bolivia
	Macleania salapa	Ecuador to Peru.
	Macleania smithiana	Colombia to Ecuador.
	Macleania spectabilis	Colombia.
	Macleania stricta	Colombia.
	Macleania subsessilis	Ecuador.
	Macleania tropica	Colombia.
