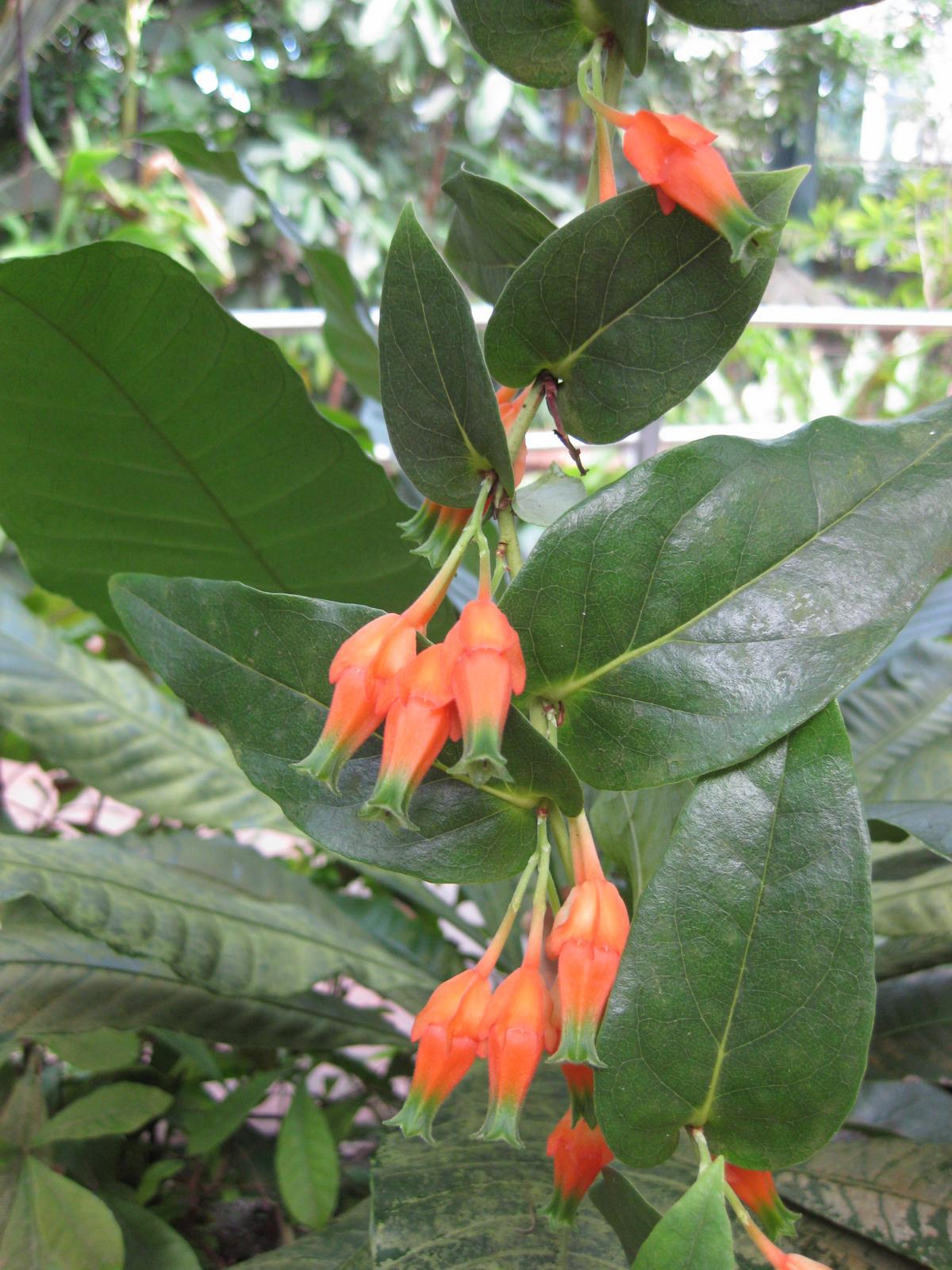

Scientific classification
- Kingdom: Plantae
- Clade: Tracheophytes
- Clade: Angiosperms
- Clade: Eudicots
- Clade: Asterids
- Order: Ericales
- Family: Ericaceae
- Genus: Macleania
- Species: M. pentaptera

Binomial name
- Macleania pentaptera Hoerold
- It is endemic to Ecuador

Synonyms
- Anthopterus ericae Sleumer; Macleania pentaptera var. longicalyx Gilli; Macleania sleumeriana A.C.Sm.

= Macleania pentaptera =

Species of neotropical blueberry

Macleania pentaptera, also known as gualicón or hualicón, is a species of tropical plant endemic to Ecuador.

== Description ==
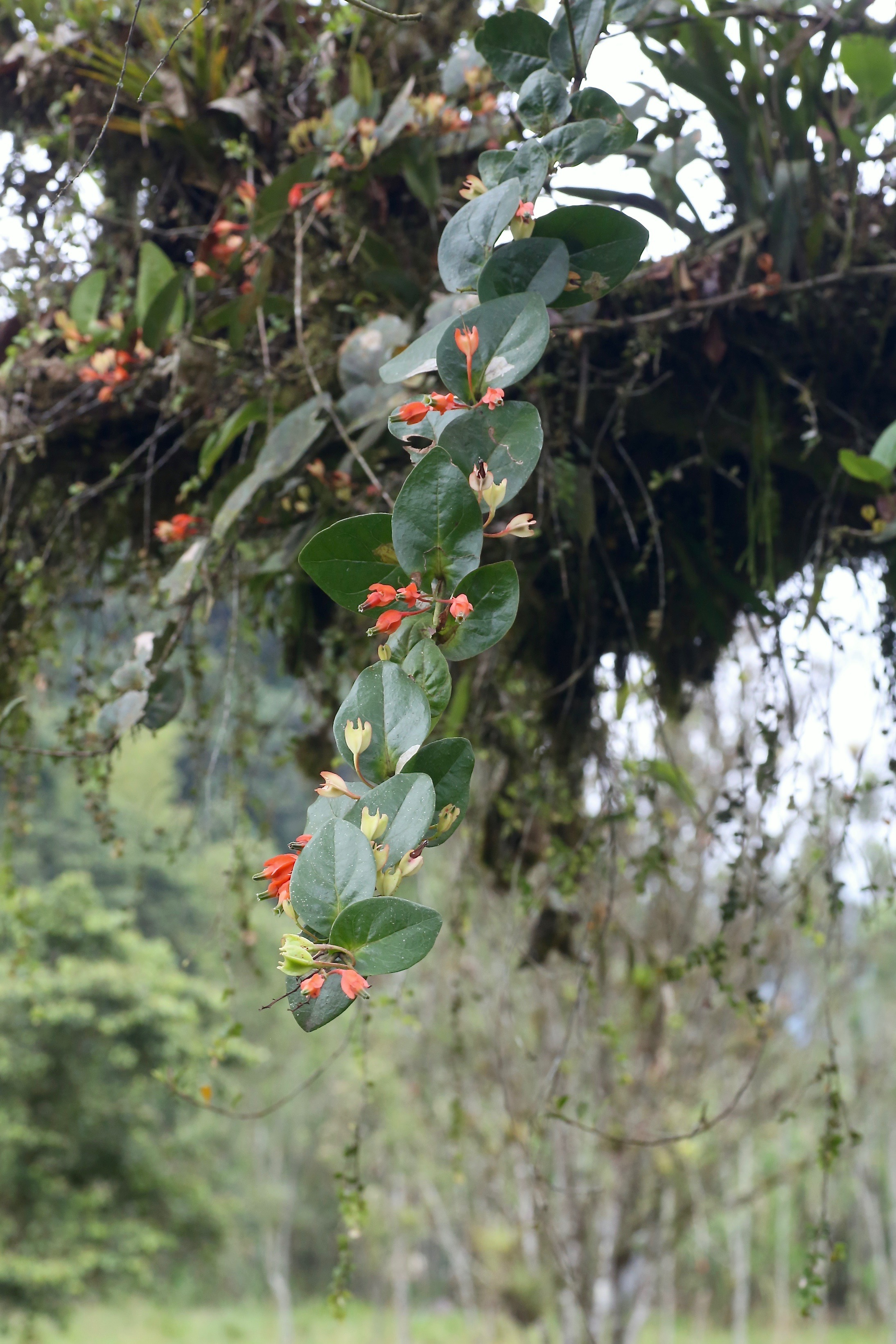
Macleania pentaptera growing along a river bank in Mindo, Ecuador

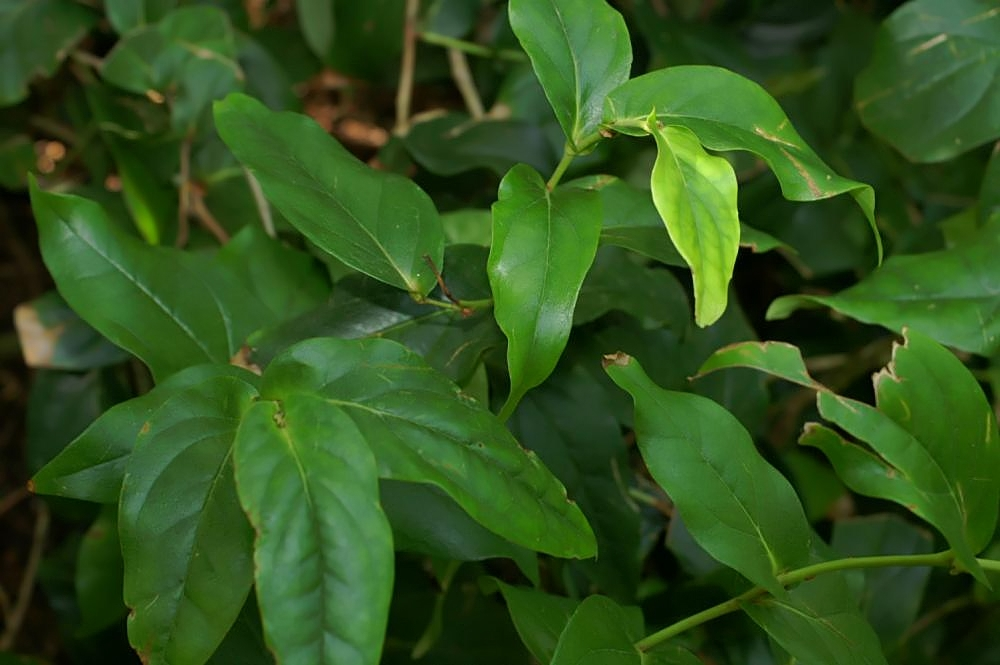
Macleania pentaptera foliage

=== Vegetative characteristics ===
Macleania pentaptera is an epiphytic or terrestrial, branched shrub with up to 3 m long branches. The terete, glabrous branches have smooth, brown bark. The internodes are 2–3 cm long. The glabrous, coriaceous, ovate to elliptic leaves with an entire margin are (3–)7–14.5 cm long, and (2–)3.5–9 cm wide. The pinnate leaf venation is impressed above, and is prominent on the abaxial leaf surface. The glabrous petiole is 2–6 mm long.

=== Generative characteristics ===
The axillary or terminal, racemose inflorescence with an up to 4 cm long rhachis bears 2–7(–8) fleshy, waxy, nectariferous, pedicellate, tubular, vibrant, orange-red, green-tipped flowers with 9–25(–33) mm long pedicels. The five-winged, obconical, 0.8–1 cm long, and 0.6 cm wide calyx has five acute teeth. The tubular, fused, urceolate, pentagonal corolla is 1.7 cm long, and 0.4–0.5 cm wide. The throat is densely pilose. The androecium consists of 10 stamens, which are 10–12.5 mm long. The gynoecium consists of 5 carpels. The translucent, white to green, globose, 20 mm wide berry bears numerous seeds.

== Taxonomy ==
It was published by Rudolf Hoerold in 1909. The variety Macleania pentaptera var. longicalyx Gilli published by Alexander Gilli in 1983 is not accepted and is widely regarded as a synonym of Macleania pentaptera. Within the subfamily Vaccinioideae, it is placed in the tribe Vaccinieae.

=== Etymology ===
The specific epithet pentaptera from the Greek pente meaning five, and pteryx meaning wing, refers to the five-winged calyx.

=== Homonyms ===
The correct name of the homonym Macleania pentaptera Sleumer published by Hermann Otto Sleumer in 1936 is Macleania ericae Sleumer published by Hermann Otto Sleumer in 1938.

== Distribution and habitat ==
It occurs in montane forests of Ecuador at elevations of 150–2100(–4000) m above sea level.

== Ecology ==
=== Pollination ===
The flowers are pollinated by hummingbirds.

=== Herbivory ===
The leaves are gathered by Atta leaf-cutter ants.

== Use ==
It is sometimes cultivated as an ornamental plant, but it is rare in cultivation. The very sweet and pleasant fruit is edible.
