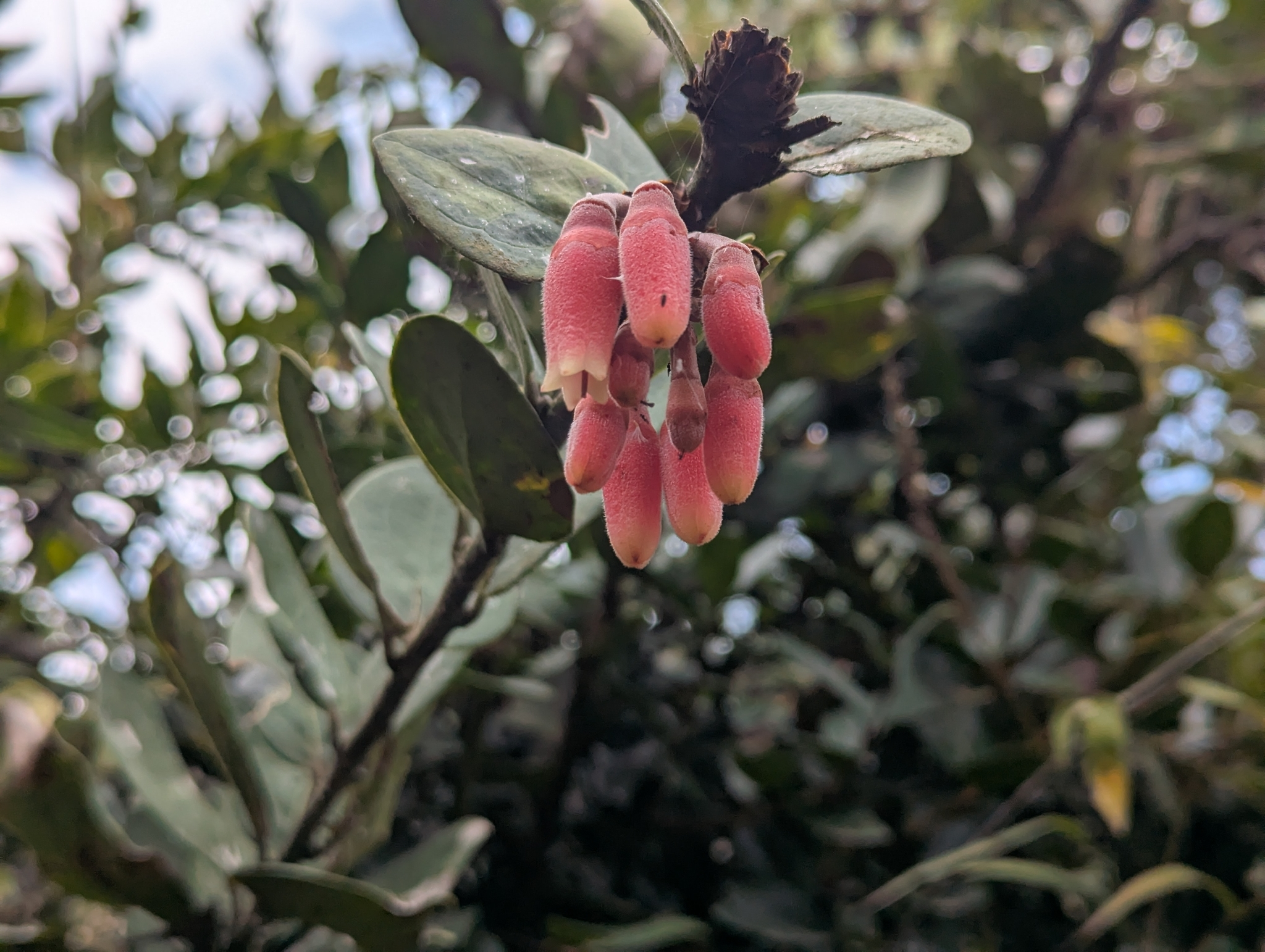

Conservation status
- Near Threatened (IUCN 3.1)

Scientific classification
- Kingdom: Plantae
- Clade: Tracheophytes
- Clade: Angiosperms
- Clade: Eudicots
- Clade: Asterids
- Order: Ericales
- Family: Ericaceae
- Genus: Macleania
- Species: M. loeseneriana

Binomial name
- Macleania loeseneriana Hoerold

= Macleania loeseneriana =

Species of flowering plant

Macleania loeseneriana is a species of plant in the family Ericaceae. It is endemic to Ecuador.
