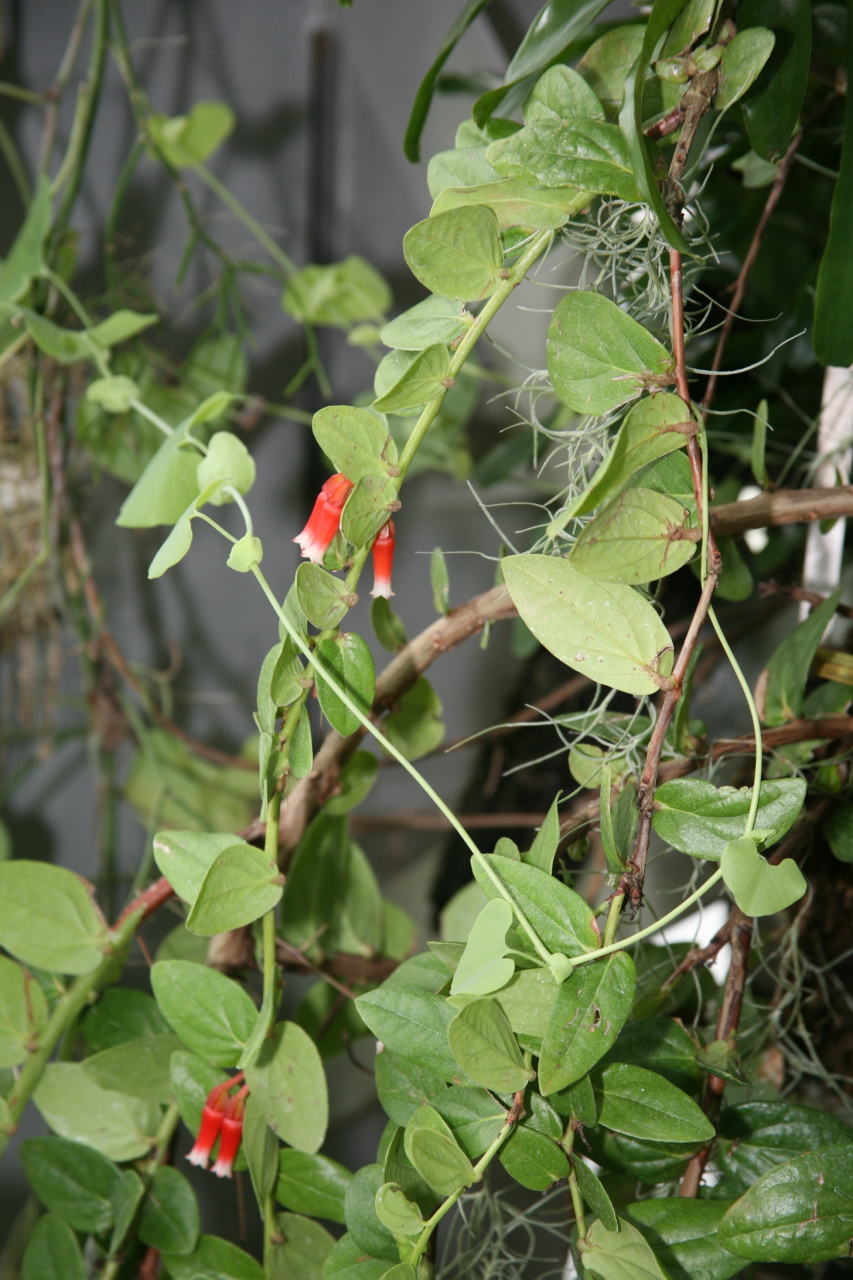
- Macleania insignis at Morrill Greenhouse, University of Massachusetts Amherst

Scientific classification
- Kingdom: Plantae
- Clade: Tracheophytes
- Clade: Angiosperms
- Clade: Eudicots
- Clade: Asterids
- Order: Ericales
- Family: Ericaceae
- Genus: Macleania
- Species: M. insignis

Binomial name
- Macleania insignis M.Martens & Galeotti

Synonyms
- Heterotypic Synonyms: Macleania coccinea Decne.; Macleania colorata Klotzsch; Macleania compacta A.C.Sm.; Macleania cordata Lem.; Macleania cordata var. linearifolia Donn.Sm.; Macleania insignis var. linearifolia (Donn.Sm.) Standl. & L.O.Williams; Macleania linearifolia (Donn.Sm.) A.C.Sm.; Macleania longiflora Lindl.; Macleania ovata Klotzsch; Macleania subracemosa L.O.Williams; Macleania tenuiflora Klotzsch; Macleania tenuifolia Walp.; Macleania tuberosa Nied.; Orthaea laurifolia Luteyn; Thibaudia laurifolia M.Martens & Galeotti

= Macleania insignis =

Species of flowering plant

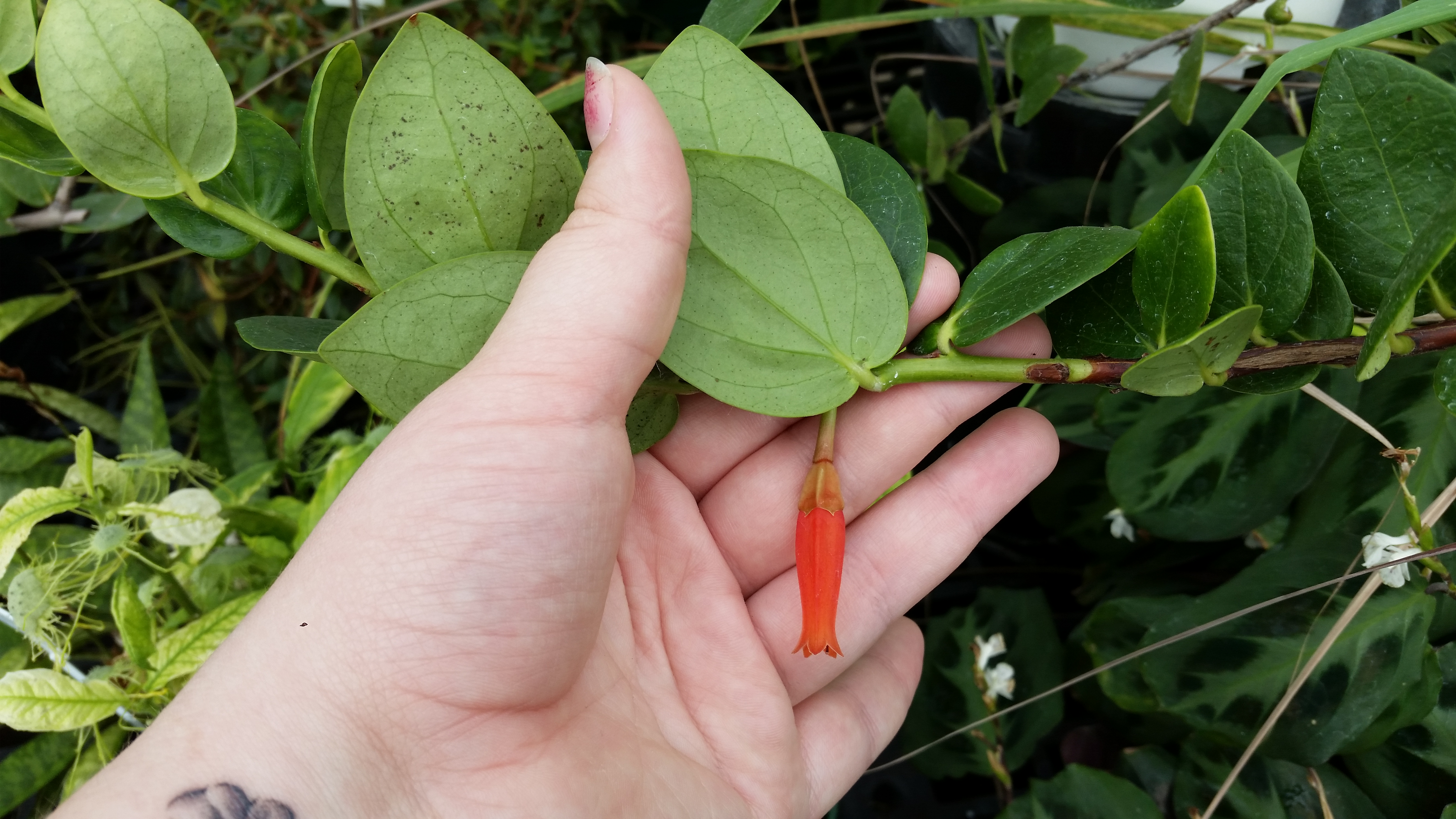
Macleania insignis flower at Morrill Greenhouse, University of Massachusetts Amherst

Macleania insignis is a species of flowering plant in the blueberry family, Ericaceae. Its most common ancestors in North America include blueberries and cranberries. The family Ericaceae is spread across the world, with a large concentration found in South America. This plant falls within the Neotropical subgroup and then Andean clade of this family. The Psammisia II section shares the closest common ancestor to this plant, and its closest split on a family tree is shared with Macleania coccoloboides and Macleania bullata. Phylogenic classification of M. insignis has primarily been carried out through an examination of morphological traits as well as genetic analysis. Macleania is an angiosperm eudicot, in the order of Ericales and the family Ericaceae.

== Description ==
Macleania insignis displays 3 cm tubular red orange flowers and dense shiny oval leaves. It can grow in a cloud forest (as an epiphyte) and as a terrestrial plant. The plant can spread out over several feet, and its roots form large, woody tubers that partially emerge above the soil surface in terrestrial plants. Macleania produces an edible fruit that is purple and lightly sweet.

== In the wild ==
In a natural setting plants within the Macleania clade are pollinated by hummingbirds. The ability of a plant to attract a pollinator impacts its level of reproductive success. Macleania are found in regions of cloud forest in Central and South America, specifically Mexico, Costa Rica, and Colombia.

== Cultivation ==
Macleania insignis is considered to be a desirable and attractive greenhouse plant, it can be found for sale but is rare. M. insignis prefers moderate greenhouse conditions and partial shade
